= List of Quantum Leap (1989 TV series) episodes =

Quantum Leap is an American television series that first aired on NBC from March 26, 1989 to May 5, 1993. The series was created by Donald P. Bellisario, and starred Scott Bakula and Dean Stockwell. This list is in chronological order of broadcasts with 97 episodes produced.

== Series overview ==
Season	Episodes	Originally released	
Season	Episodes	First released	Last released
1	9	March 26, 1989	May 17, 1989
2	22	September 20, 1989	May 9, 1990
3	22	September 28, 1990	May 22, 1991
4	22	September 18, 1991	May 20, 1992
5	22	September 22, 1992	May 5, 1993

== Episodes ==
=== Season 1 (1989) ===
No. overall	No. in season	Title	Directed by	Written by	Leap details (Name, date & location)	Original release date	Prod. code	Viewers (millions)
1	1	"Genesis"	David Hemmings	Donald P. Bellisario	Tom Stratton; September 13, 1956; Edwards Air Force Base, Blockfield, California / Tim Fox; Summer 1968; Waco, Texas	March 26, 1989	83549	23.3
2	2	"Genesis"	David Hemmings	Donald P. Bellisario	Tom Stratton; September 13, 1956; Edwards Air Force Base, Blockfield, California / Tim Fox; Summer 1968; Waco, Texas	March 26, 1989	83549	23.3
3	3	"Star-Crossed"	Mark Sobel	Deborah Pratt	Gerald Bryant; June 15, 1972; Marion, Ohio	March 31, 1989	65003	15.7
4	4	"The Right Hand of God"	Gilbert Shilton	John Hill	Clarence "Kid" Cody; October 24, 1974; Sacramento, California	April 7, 1989	65002	12.0
5	5	"How the Tess Was Won"	Ivan Dixon	Deborah Arakelian	"Doc" Young; August 5, 1956; Texas	April 14, 1989	65004	14.2
6	6	"Double Identity"	Aaron Lipstadt	Donald P. Bellisario	Frankie LaPalma/ Geno Fescotti; November 8, 1965; Brooklyn, New York	April 21, 1989	65001	9.8
7	7	"The Color of Truth"	Michael Vejar	Deborah Pratt	Jessie Tyler; August 8, 1955; Red Dog, Alabama	May 3, 1989	65013	15.0
8	8	"Camikazi Kid"	Alan J. Levi	Paul Brown	Cameron "Cam" Wilson; June 6, 1961; Los Angeles, California	May 10, 1989	65014	18.4
9	9	"Play It Again, Seymour"	Aaron Lipstadt	Story by : Donald P. Bellisario, Scott Shepard & Tom Blomquist; Teleplay by : Donald P. Bellisario & Scott Shepard	Nick Allen; April 14, 1953; New York City, New York	May 17, 1989	65009	14.6

=== Season 2 (1989–90) ===
No. overall	No. in season	Title	Directed by	Written by	Leap details (Name, date & location)	Original release date	Prod. code	Viewers (millions)
10	1	"Honeymoon Express"	Aaron Lipstadt	Donald P. Bellisario	Unnamed Firefighter; 1957; Unknown Location / Tom McBride; April 27, 1960; New York, New York	September 20, 1989	65411	13.5
11	2	"Disco Inferno"	Gilbert Shilton	Paul Brown	Chad Stone; April 1, 1976; Burbank, California	September 27, 1989	65401	13.0
12	3	"The Americanization of Machiko"	Gilbert Shilton	Charlie Coffey	Charles Lee MacKenzie; August 4, 1953; Oak Creek, Ohio	October 11, 1989	65406	14.1
13	4	"What Price Gloria?"	Alan J. Levi	Deborah Pratt	Samantha Stormer; October 16, 1961; Detroit, Michigan	October 25, 1989	65017	14.3
14	5	"Blind Faith"	David G. Phinney	Scott Shepard	Andrew Ross; February 6, 1964; New York City	November 1, 1989	65402	13.1
15	6	"Good Morning, Peoria"	Michael Zinberg	Chris Ruppenthal	Howlin' Chick Howell; September 9, 1959; Peoria, Illinois	November 8, 1989	65408	15.3
16	7	"Thou Shalt Not..."	Randy Roberts	Tammy Ader	David Basch; February 2, 1974; Los Angeles, California	November 15, 1989	65409	14.0
17	8	"Jimmy"	James Whitmore, Jr.	Paul M. Belous & Robert Wolterstorff	Jimmy LaMotta; October 14, 1964; Oakland, California	November 22, 1989	65407	15.8
18	9	"So Help Me God"	Andy Cadiff	Deborah Pratt	Leonard Dancey; July 29, 1957; Louisiana	November 29, 1989	65410	16.9
19	10	"Catch a Falling Star"	Donald P. Bellisario	Paul Brown	Ray Hutton; May 21, 1979; Syracuse, New York	December 6, 1989	65413	13.4
20	11	"A Portrait for Troian"	Michael Zinberg	Story by : John Hill & Scott Shepard; Teleplay by : Scott Shepard & Donald P. Bellisario	Timothy Mintz; February 7, 1971; Near Los Angeles, California	December 13, 1989	65019	12.9
21	12	"Animal Frat"	Gilbert Shilton	Chris Ruppenthal	Knut "Wild Thing" Wileton; October 19, 1967; Meeks College in California	January 3, 1990	65417	15.6
22	13	"Another Mother"	Joseph L. Scanlan	Deborah Pratt	Linda Bruckner; September 30, 1981; Scottsdale, Arizona	January 10, 1990	65415	16.8
23	14	"All-Americans"	John Cullum	Paul Brown & Donald P. Bellisario	Eddie Vega; November 6, 1962; Woodland Hills, California	January 17, 1990	65418	14.7
24	15	"Her Charm"	Christopher T. Welch	Story by : Paul M. Belous, Robert Wolterstorff, Deborah Pratt & Donald P. Bellisario; Teleplay by : Deborah Pratt & Donald P. Bellisario	Peter Langley; September 26, 1973; Boston, Massachusetts	February 7, 1990	65416	18.1
25	16	"Freedom"	Alan J. Levi	Chris Ruppenthal	George Washaki; November 22, 1970; Nevada	February 14, 1990	65423	17.0
26	17	"Good Night, Dear Heart"	Christopher T. Welch	Paul Brown	Melvin Spooner; November 9, 1957; Riven Rock, Massachusetts	March 7, 1990	65424	17.0
27	18	"Pool Hall Blues"	Joe Napolitano	Randy Holland	Charlie "Black Magic" Walters; September 4, 1954; Chicago, Illinois	March 14, 1990	65422	14.8
28	19	"Leaping in Without a Net"	Christopher T. Welch	Tommy Thompson	Victor Panzini; November 18, 1958; Near Denver, Colorado	March 28, 1990	65421	16.9
29	20	"Maybe Baby"	Michael Zinberg	Julie Brown & Paul Brown	Buster; March 11, 1963; Texas	April 4, 1990	65428	17.0
30	21	"Sea Bride"	Joe Napolitano	Deborah Pratt	Phillip Dumont; June 3, 1954; RMS Queen Mary in the Upper New York Bay	May 2, 1990	65430	14.2
31	22	"M.I.A."	Michael Zinberg	Donald P. Bellisario	Jake Rawlings; April 1, 1969; San Diego, California	May 9, 1990	65412	15.6

=== Season 3 (1990–91) ===
No. overall	No. in season	Title	Directed by	Written by	Leap details (Name, date & location)	Original release date	Prod. code	Viewers (millions)
32	1	"The Leap Home (Part 1)"	Joe Napolitano	Donald P. Bellisario	Sam Beckett; November 25, 1969; Elk Ridge, Indiana	September 28, 1990	66401	12.1
33	2	"The Leap Home (Part 2) – Vietnam"	Michael Zinberg	Donald P. Bellisario	Herbert "Magic" Williams; April 7, 1970; Vietnam	October 5, 1990	66402	12.9
34	3	"Leap of Faith"	James Whitmore Jr.	Story by : Nick Harding, Karen Hall & Tommy Thompson; Teleplay by : Tommy Thompson	Francis "Frank" Pistano; August 19, 1963; Philadelphia, Pennsylvania	October 12, 1990	66408	13.9
35	4	"One Strobe over the Line"	Michael Zinberg	Chris Ruppenthal	Karl Granson; June 15, 1965; New York City	October 19, 1990	66409	12.1
36	5	"The Boogieman"	Joe Napolitano	Chris Ruppenthal	Joshua Rey; October 31, 1964; Coventry, Maine	October 26, 1990	66410	12.6
37	6	"Miss Deep South"	Christopher T. Welch	Tommy Thompson	Darlene Monty; June 7, 1958; Louisiana	November 2, 1990	66406	12.7
38	7	"Black on White on Fire"	Joe Napolitano	Deborah Pratt	Ray Harper; August 11, 1965; Watts, Los Angeles, California	November 9, 1990	66403	12.6
39	8	"The Great Spontini"	James Whitmore Jr.	Cristy Dawson & Beverly Bridges	Harry Spontini; May 9, 1974; Oakland, California	November 16, 1990	66412	11.8
40	9	"Rebel Without a Clue"	James Whitmore Jr.	Story by : Nick Harding & Paul Brown; Teleplay by : Randy Holland & Paul Brown	Shane "Funny Bone" Thomas; September 1, 1958; Near Big Sur, California	November 30, 1990	66407	13.0
41	10	"A Little Miracle"	Michael Watkins	Story by : Sandy Fries; Teleplay by : Sandy Fries & Robert A. Wolterstorff	Reginald Pearson; December 24, 1962; New York, New York	December 21, 1990	66414	11.2
42	11	"Runaway"	Michael Katleman	Paul Brown	Butchie Rickett; July 4, 1964; Carbon County, Wyoming	January 4, 1991	66405	13.0
43	12	"8½ Months"	James Whitmore Jr.	Deborah Pratt	Billie Jean Crockett; November 15, 1955; Claremore, Oklahoma	March 6, 1991	66421	17.9
44	13	"Future Boy"	Michael Switzer	Tommy Thompson	Kenny "Future Boy" Sharp; October 6, 1957; St. Louis, Missouri	March 13, 1991	66417	17.0
45	14	"Private Dancer"	Debbie Allen	Paul Brown	Rod "Rod the Bod" McCarty; October 6, 1979; New York City	March 20, 1991	66416	20.7
46	15	"Piano Man"	James Whitmore Jr.	Ed Scharlach	Joey DeNardo; November 10, 1985; Tularosa, New Mexico	March 27, 1991	66419	18.0
47	16	"Southern Comforts"	Chris Ruppenthal	Tommy Thompson	Gilbert LaBonte; August 4, 1961; New Orleans, Louisiana	April 3, 1991	64422	15.2
48	17	"Glitter Rock"	Andy Cadiff	Chris Ruppenthal	Geoffrey "Tonic" Mole; April 12, 1974; Detroit, Michigan	April 10, 1991	64404	15.8
49	18	"A Hunting We Will Go"	Andy Cadiff	Beverly Bridges	Gordon O'Reilly; June 18, 1976; Arkansas	April 17, 1991	66424	16.5
50	19	"Last Dance Before an Execution"	Michael Watkins	Story by : Bill Bigelow, Donald P. Bellisario & Deborah Pratt; Teleplay by : Deborah Pratt	Jesuś Ortega; May 12, 1971; Tallahassee, Florida	May 1, 1991	66423	18.3
51	20	"Heart of a Champion"	Joe Napolitano	Tommy Thompson	Terry Sammis ("Nikolai Russkie"); July 23, 1955; Atlanta, Georgia	May 8, 1991	66425	16.5
52	21	"Nuclear Family"	James Whitmore, Jr.	Paul Brown	Eddie Elroy; October 26, 1962; Homestead, Florida	May 15, 1991	66426	13.3
53	22	"Shock Theater"	Joe Napolitano	Deborah Pratt	Sam Beiderman; October 3, 1954; Havenwell, Pennsylvania	May 22, 1991	66428	18.6

=== Season 4 (1991–92) ===
No. overall	No. in season	Title	Directed by	Written by	Leap details (Name, date & location)	Original release date	Prod. code	Viewers (millions)
54	1	"The Leap Back"	Michael Zinberg	Donald P. Bellisario	Tom Jarrett; June 15, 1945; Crown Point, Indiana / Himself; September 18, 1999; Stallions Gate, New Mexico	September 18, 1991	67303	21.2
55	2	"Play Ball"	Joe Napolitano	Tommy Thompson	Lester "Doc" Fuller; August 6, 1961; Galveston, Texas	September 25, 1991	67305	16.2
56	3	"Hurricane"	Michael Watkins	Chris Ruppenthal	Archie Necaise; August 17, 1969; Jackson Point, Mississippi	October 2, 1991	67306	14.8
57	4	"Justice"	Rob Bowman	Toni Graphia	Clyde; May 11, 1965; Alabama	October 9, 1991	67309	15.4
58	5	"Permanent Wave"	Scott Bakula	Beverly Bridges	Frank Bianca; June 2, 1983; Beverly Hills, California	October 16, 1991	67302	15.2
59	6	"Raped"	Michael Zinberg	Beverly Bridges	Katie McBain; June 20, 1980; Mill Valley, California	October 30, 1991	67312	16.6
60	7	"The Wrong Stuff"	Joe Napolitano	Paul Brown	Bobo the chimp January 24, 1961; Cape Canaveral, Florida	November 6, 1991	67308	14.4
61	8	"Dreams"	Anita W. Addison	Deborah Pratt	Jack Stone; February 28, 1979; Malibu, California	November 13, 1991	67320	13.9
62	9	"A Single Drop of Rain"	Virgil W. Vogel	Story by : Richard C. Okie, Donald P. Bellisario & Ralph Meyering, Jr. Teleplay by : Richard C. Okie	William "Billy" Beaumont; Clover Bend, Texas; September 7, 1953	November 20, 1991	67317	16.2
63	10	"Unchained"	Michael Watkins	Paris Qualles	Chance Cole; November 2, 1956; Talawaga County, Mississippi	November 27, 1991	67314	17.4
64	11	"The Play's the Thing"	Eric Laneuville	Beverly Bridges	Joseph "Joe" Thurlow; September 9, 1969; New York City	January 8, 1992	67301	16.7
65	12	"Running For Honor"	Bob Hulme	Bobby Duncan	Thomas "Tommy" York; June 11, 1964; Near Lakeside, Macomb County, Michigan	January 15, 1992	67319	17.1
66	13	"Temptation Eyes"	Christopher Hibler	Paul Brown	Dylan Powell; February 1, 1985; San Francisco, California	January 22, 1992	67322	16.9
67	14	"The Last Gunfighter"	Joe Napolitano	Story by : Sam Rolfe; Teleplay by : Sam Rolfe & Chris Ruppenthal	Tyler Means; November 28, 1957; Coffin, Arizona	February 5, 1992	67318	13.1
68	15	"A Song for the Soul"	Michael Watkins	Deborah Pratt	Cherea; April 7, 1963; Chicago, Illinois	February 26, 1992	67304	12.2
69	16	"Ghost Ship"	Anita W. Addison	Donald P. Bellisario & Paris Qualles	Eddie Brackett; August 13, 1956; Bermuda Triangle	March 4, 1992	67307	14.6
70	17	"Roberto!"	Scott Bakula	Chris Ruppenthal	Roberto Gutierrez; January 27, 1982; Destiny, New Mexico	March 11, 1992	67326	14.5
71	18	"It's a Wonderful Leap"	Paul Brown	Story by : Danielle Alexandra; Teleplay by : Danielle Alexandra & Paul Brown	Max Greenman; May 10, 1958; New York City	April 1, 1992	67324	15.4
72	19	"Moments to Live"	Joe Napolitano	Tommy Thompson	Kyle Hart; May 4, 1985; Los Angeles, California	April 8, 1992	67325	18.0
73	20	"The Curse of Ptah-Hotep"	Joe Napolitano	Chris Ruppenthal	Dr. Dale Conway; March 2, 1957; Saqqara, Egypt	April 22, 1992	67328	15.3
74	21	"Stand Up"	Michael Zinberg	Deborah Pratt	Davey Parker; April 30, 1959; Glendale, Arizona	May 13, 1992	67315	13.9
75	22	"A Leap for Lisa"	James Whitmore, Jr.	Donald P. Bellisario	Al "Bingo" Calavicci; June 25, 1957; San Diego Naval Air Station, California	May 20, 1992	67329	16.8

=== Season 5 (1992–93) ===
No. overall	No. in season	Title	Directed by	Written by	Leap details (Name, date & location)	Original release date	Prod. code	Viewers (millions)
76	1	"Lee Harvey Oswald (Part 1) – Leaping on a String"	James Whitmore Jr.	Donald P. Bellisario	Lee Harvey Oswald; March 21, 1963 / Dallas, Texas; October 5–7, 1957; Atsugi, Kanagawa, Japan / January 6, 1959; Tustin, California	September 22, 1992	68102A	16.6
77	2	"Lee Harvey Oswald (Part 2) – Leap to Judgement"	James Whitmore Jr.	Donald P. Bellisario	Lee Harvey Oswald; October 21, 1959; Lubyanka in Moscow, USSR / April 10, 1963; Dallas, Texas / August 9, 1963; New Orleans, Louisiana / November 21–22, 1963; Dallas, Texas	September 22, 1992	68102B	16.6
78	3	"Leaping of the Shrew"	Alan J. Levi	Robin Jill Bernheim & Richard C. Okie	Nikos Stathatos; September 27, 1956; Aegean Sea	September 29, 1992	68104	15.9
79	4	"Nowhere to Run"	Alan J. Levi	Tommy Thompson	Ronald Miller; August 10, 1968; San Diego, California	October 6, 1992	68103	14.3
80	5	"Killin' Time"	Michael Watkins	Tommy Thompson	Leon Stiles; June 18, 1958; Pine County, Oklahoma	October 20, 1992	68106	14.6
81	6	"Star Light, Star Bright"	Christopher Hibler	Richard C. Okie	Maxwell Stoddard; May 21, 1966; Charlemont, Massachusetts	October 27, 1992	68101	11.5
82	7	"Deliver Us from Evil"	Bob Hulme	Deborah Pratt, Robin Jill Bernheim & Tommy Thompson	Jimmy LaMotta; March 19, 1966; Oakland, California	November 10, 1992	68109	13.9
83	8	"Trilogy: Part I (One Little Heart)"	James Whitmore Jr.	Deborah Pratt	Clayton Fuller; August 8, 1955; Pottersville, Louisiana	November 17, 1992	68105	12.8
84	9	"Trilogy: Part II (For Your Love)"	James Whitmore Jr.	Deborah Pratt	Will Kinman; June 14, 1966; Pottersville, Louisiana	November 24, 1992	68112	13.6
85	10	"Trilogy: Part III (The Last Door)"	James Whitmore Jr.	Deborah Pratt	Larry Stanton III; July 28, 1978; Baton Rouge, Louisiana	November 24, 1992	68113	13.6
86	11	"Promised Land"	Scott Bakula	Gillian Horvath & Tommy Thompson	Willie Walters; December 22, 1971; Elk Ridge, Indiana	December 15, 1992	68110	11.5
87	12	"A Tale of Two Sweeties"	Christopher Hibler	Robin Jill Bernheim	Marty Elroy; February 25, 1958; Pompano Beach Airpark, Florida	January 5, 1993	68118	9.8
88	13	"Liberation"	Bob Hulme	Chris Abbott & Deborah Pratt	Margaret Sanders; October 16, 1968; Connecticut	January 12, 1993	68108	10.3
89	14	"Dr. Ruth"	Stuart Margolin	Robin Jill Bernheim	Ruth Westheimer; April 25, 1985; Manhattan, New York	January 19, 1993	68114	10.7
90	15	"Blood Moon"	Alan J. Levi	Tommy Thompson	Lord Nigel Corrington; March 10, 1975; Outside of London, England	February 9, 1993	68117	10.8
91	16	"Return of the Evil Leaper"	Harvey Laidman	Richard C. Okie	Arnold Watkins; October 8, 1956; North Falls, New York	February 23, 1993	68124	11.5
92	17	"Revenge of the Evil Leaper"	Debbie Allen	Deborah Pratt	Elizabeth Tate; September 16, 1987; Mallard, Ohio	February 23, 1993	68125	11.5
93	18	"Goodbye Norma Jean"	Christopher Hibler	Richard C. Okie	Dennis Boardman; April 4, 1960; Hollywood, California	March 2, 1993	68115	13.1
94	19	"The Beast Within"	Gus Trikonis	John D'Aquino	Henry Adams; November 6, 1972; Washington state	March 16, 1993	68122	10.0
95	20	"The Leap Between the States"	David Hemmings	Richard C. Okie	John Beckett; September 20, 1862; Mansfield County, Virginia	March 30, 1993	68121	11.8
96	21	"Memphis Melody"	James Whitmore Jr.	Robin Jill Bernheim	Elvis Presley; July 3, 1954; Memphis, Tennessee	April 20, 1993	68123	10.1
97	22	"Mirror Image"	James Whitmore Jr.	Donald P. Bellisario	Himself; August 8, 1953; Cokeburg, Pennsylvania / April 3, 1969; San Diego, California	May 5, 1993	68126	20.6

== Ratings ==
Quantum Leap : U.S. viewers per episode (millions)

Season	Episode number																					
Season	1	2	3	4	5	6	7	8	9	10	11	12	13	14	15	16	17	18	19	20	21	22
1	23.3	23.3	15.7	12.0	14.2	9.8	15.0	18.4	14.6	–												
2	13.5	13.0	14.1	14.3	13.1	15.3	14.0	15.8	16.9	13.4	12.9	15.6	16.8	14.7	18.1	17.0	17.0	14.8	16.9	17.0	14.2	15.6
3	12.1	12.9	13.9	12.1	12.6	12.7	12.6	11.8	13.0	11.2	13.0	17.9	17.0	20.7	18.0	15.2	15.8	16.5	18.3	16.5	13.3	18.6
4	21.2	16.2	14.8	15.4	15.2	16.6	14.4	13.9	16.2	17.4	16.7	17.1	16.9	13.1	12.2	14.6	14.5	15.4	18.0	15.3	13.9	16.8
5	16.6	16.6	15.9	14.3	14.6	11.5	13.9	12.8	13.6	13.6	11.5	9.8	10.3	10.7	10.8	11.5	11.5	13.1	10.0	11.8	10.1	20.6

Audience measurement performed by Nielsen Media Research
