= Troian Bellisario =

American actress (born 1985)

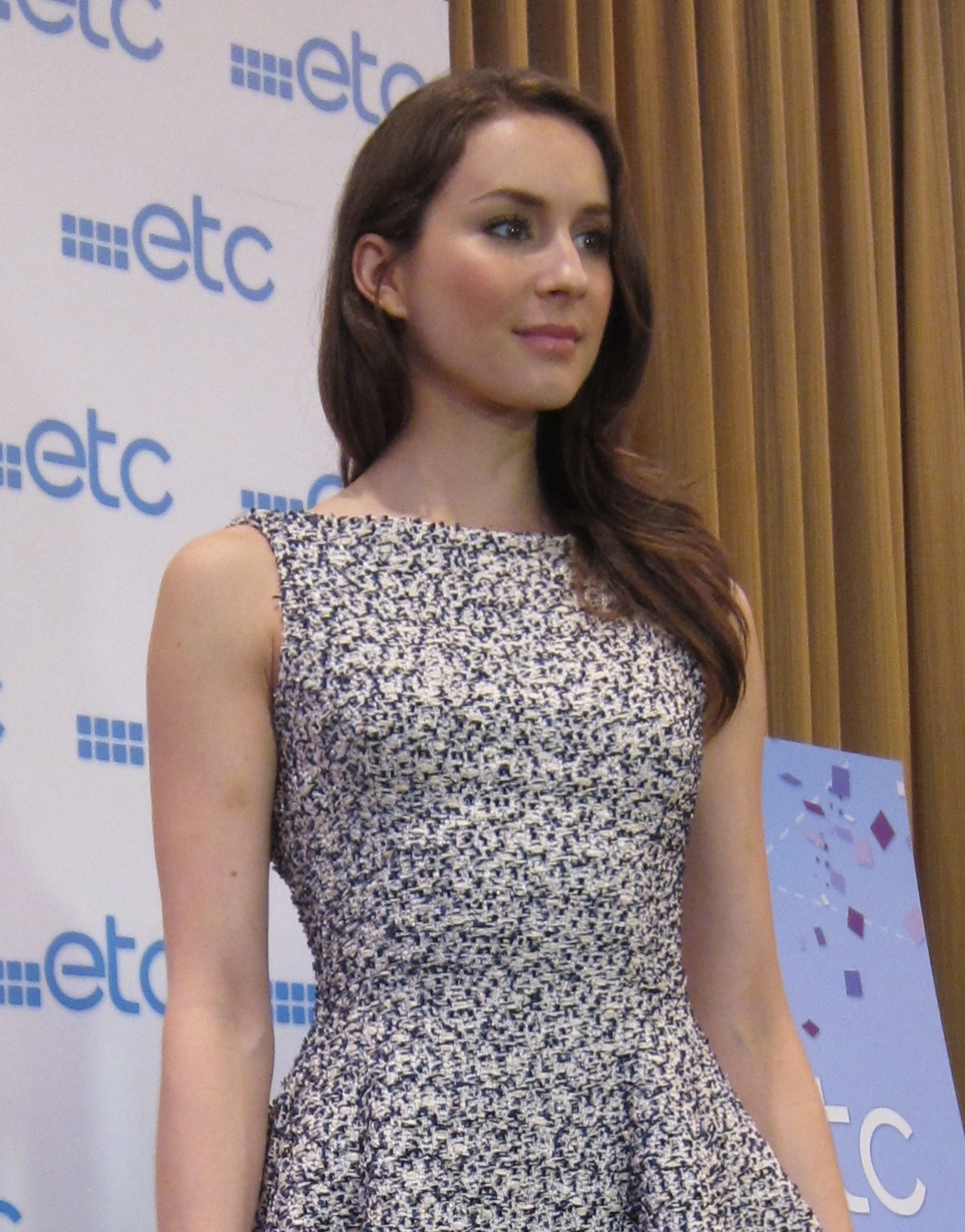
- Bellisario in 2013
- Born: Troian Avery Bellisario; October 28, 1985 (age 41); Los Angeles, California, U.S.
- Education: University of Southern California (BFA)
- Occupations: Actress; writer; director; producer
- Years active: 1988–present
- Spouse: Patrick J. Adams (m. 2016)
- Children: 3
- Parent(s): Donald P. Bellisario; Deborah Pratt
- Relatives: Michael Bellisario (half-brother); Sean Murray (stepbrother)

Troian Avery Bellisario (born October 28, 1985) is an American actress and filmmaker. The daughter of producer Donald P. Bellisario and actress Deborah Pratt, she gained international attention for her portrayal of Spencer Hastings in the Freeform drama series Pretty Little Liars (2010–2017), for which she received various accolades.

In film, Bellisario has received recognition for her performances in C.O.G. (2013), Feed (2017)—which she also wrote and produced—Clara (2018), and Where'd You Go, Bernadette (2019). On television, Bellisario appeared in the television drama film Sister Cities (2016), the web series Lauren (2012–2013), and the police procedural series On Call (2025). In 2016, she married actor Patrick J. Adams, with whom she has three daughters. The couple have appeared together in three TV series, Pretty Little Liars, Plan B and Suits and in the movie, Clara.

== Early life ==
Troian Avery Bellisario was born on October 28, 1985, in Los Angeles and raised there. Her parents are producers Deborah Pratt and Donald P. Bellisario; her father created Magnum, P.I., Quantum Leap, and NCIS, among other TV series. She has a younger brother, three half-sisters, two half-brothers, and two stepbrothers, actor Sean Murray and producer Chad W. Murray. Her father is of Italian and Serbian descent, and her mother is of African American descent.

Bellisario attended Campbell Hall School in Studio City, California, from kindergarten through twelfth grade, and was top of her class. After high school, she enrolled at Vassar College for several months before taking a break for her mental health, feeling that the institution aggravated her perfectionist tendencies. She later graduated with a Bachelor of Fine Arts degree from the University of Southern California in 2009.

== Career ==
=== Early work ===
Bellisario made her acting debut in the 1988 film Last Rites at the age of three, which was directed, written and produced by her father, Donald P. Bellisario. In 1990, she guest-starred in an episode of her father's series Quantum Leap. In 1998, she co-starred with Mary-Kate and Ashley Olsen in the film Billboard Dad. Beginning in 2006, Bellisario began appearing in a number of independent short films namely, Unspoken, Archer House and Intersect.

=== 2010s ===
In November 2009, Bellisario was cast as Spencer Hastings in the TV series Pretty Little Liars based on the book series of the same name by Sara Shepard. In October 2011, Bellisario announced she was in the process of writing and creating her own film, which was successfully funded through Kickstarter on November 16, 2011. Filming ended in December 2011 and the film was officially completed by August 2012.

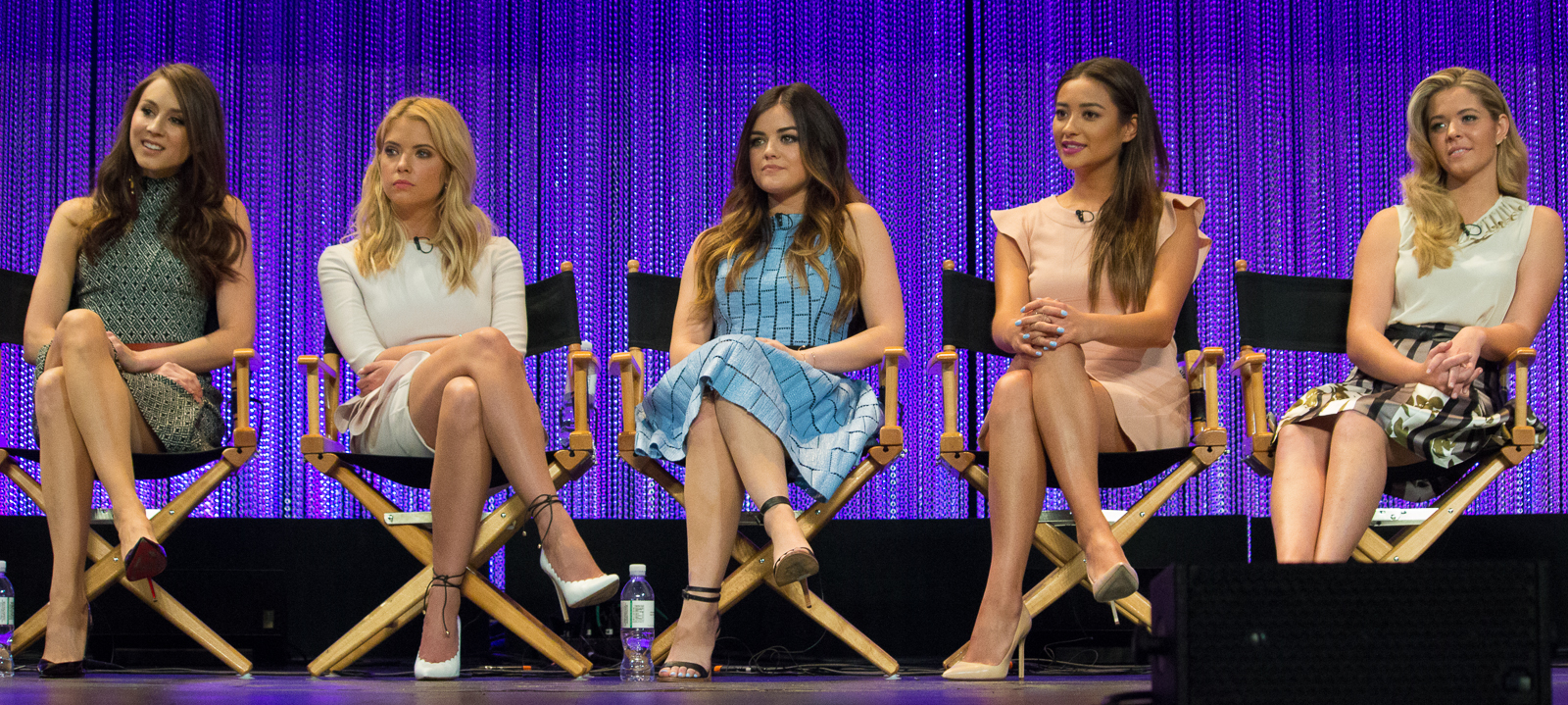
Bellisario (left) with the cast of Pretty Little Liars in 2014

In 2014, she starred in the music video for The Head and the Heart's song "Another Story". Bellisario also starred in Immediately Afterlife, a short film about two cult members who are the only survivors of their group's mass suicide, playing Bennett, alongside her Pretty Little Liars co-stars Shay Mitchell (Emily), Ian Harding (Ezra Fitz) and Nolan North (Peter Hastings). In 2015, she was cast in a leading role in the American remake of the French-Canadian film Martyrs. In 2015, Bellisario and fiancée Patrick J. Adams filmed the short film We Are Here in Haida Gwaii, which Bellisario wrote and starred in. In 2017, Bellisario starred in her feature film, Feed, which she also wrote and produced. The film was written based on Bellisario's own experiences with an eating disorder.

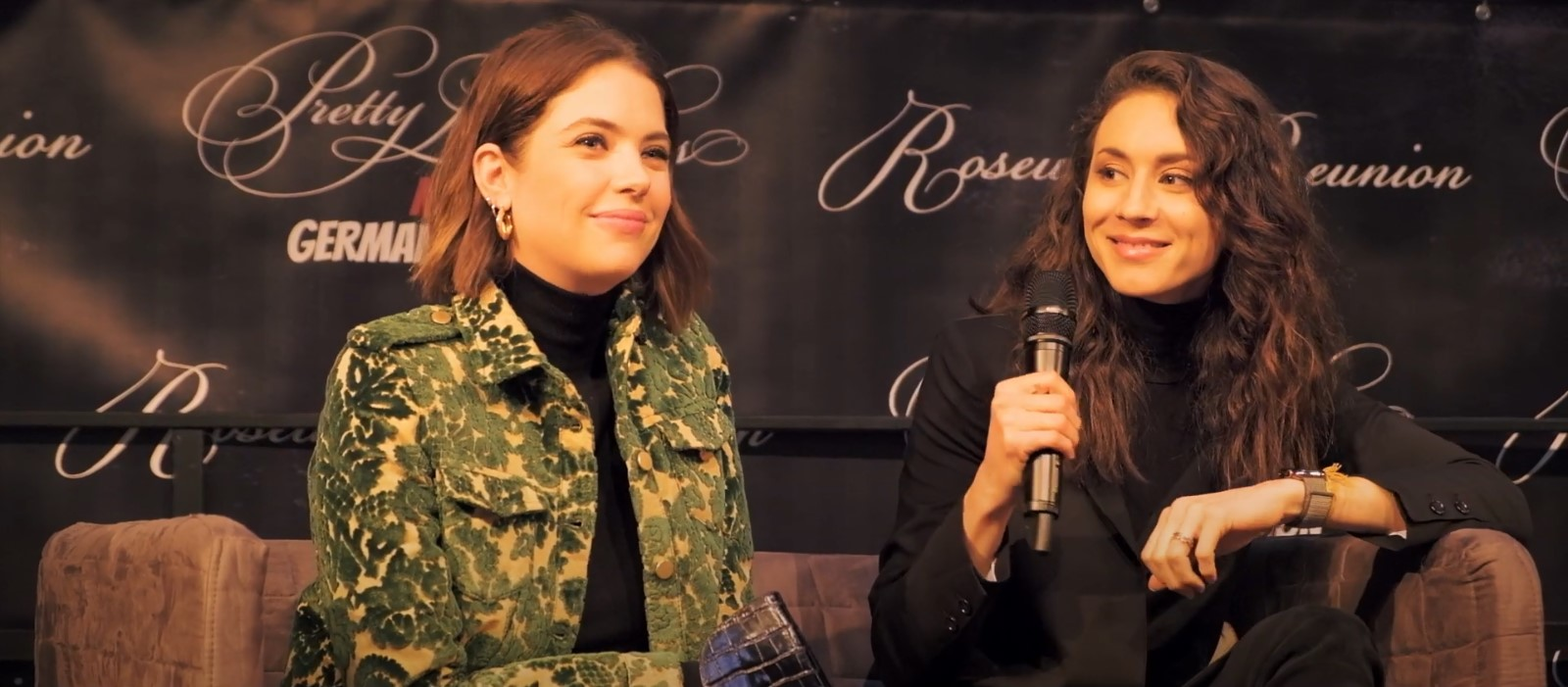
Ashley Benson and Troian Bellisario at 2019 German Comic Con

On April 7, 2016, it was announced that Bellisario would be directing season 7, episode 15 of Pretty Little Liars. This made her one of the first in the cast, alongside Chad Lowe, to direct an episode on the series. In 2020, Bellisario appeared as the bride character Jenna Marshall from the episode "Til Dex Do Us Part" in Stumptown.

Further in television, she costarred with Australian actress Jacki Weaver in the television drama film Sister Cities (2016), and opposite Bradley Whitford in the Me Too drama Lauren (2012–2013). In film, Bellisario has received recognition for her performances in C.O.G. (2013), Feed (2017), Clara (2018) and Where'd You Go, Bernadette (2019).

=== 2020s ===
In March 2020, Bellisario played the lead role of Claire in the CBS political drama pilot Ways & Means, written by Mike Murphy and Ed Redlich. The pilot, which also starred Patrick Dempsey, focused on a secret alliance between a disillusioned career politician and an idealist up-and-comer in the gridlocked American system. The show was not picked up.

In 2022, she appeared in the comedy Doula alongside Arron Shiver (who also wrote the film) and Will Greenberg. The film, produced by Chris Pine and directed by Cheryl Nichols, deals with Bellisario's character hiring her midwife's son as the latter's replacement when she passes away.

== Personal life ==
Bellisario began dating Suits star Patrick J. Adams after they met on the set of the play Equivocation in 2009. The couple briefly separated before Adams' guest appearance as Hardy in Pretty Little Liars but reunited in 2010. They later worked together on the 2012 short film The Come Up, Suits, and on the short film We Are Here. Bellisario and Adams were married on December 10, 2016, in Santa Barbara, California. They have three daughters.

In an episode of actress Katie Lowes' podcast, Katie's Crib, Bellisario and Adams said their second child was born in the backseat of their car in the hospital parking lot due to an accelerated labor, with Adams delivering the baby. Hospital staff assisted within minutes, and Bellisario and the baby were found healthy.

Bellisario said in January 2014 that she endured personal problems during high school, resulting in self-harm and an eating disorder. "I was the youngest daughter, the perfect little girl. My school was a very intense college prep school. So it was about wanting to please my father and mother and wanting to be perfect to everybody."

In 2014, Bellisario returned to her alma mater, USC School of Dramatic Arts, delivering the commencement speech.

== Filmography ==
=== Film ===
Year	Title	Role	Notes
1988	Last Rites	Nuzo's daughter	
1998	Billboard Dad	Kristen Bulut	
2006	Unspoken	Jani	Short film
2007	Archer House	Tatum	Short film
2009	Intersect	Victoria	Short film
2009	Before the Cabin Burned Down	Meg	Short film
2010	Consent	Amanda	
2010	Peep World	Film set P.A.	
2011	A November	Girlfriend	Short film
2011	Pleased to Meet You	Carson	
2012	The Come Up	Jessica	Short film
2012	Joyful Girl	Belle	Short film
2013	C.O.G.	Jennifer	
2013	Exiles	Juliet	Short film; also writer and executive producer
2014	Immediately Afterlife	Bennett	Short film
2015	Surf Noir	Lacey	Short film
2015	Martyrs	Lucie Jurin	
2015	Still a Rose	Juliet	Short film
2015	Amy	Amy	Short film
2016	In the Shadows of the Rainbow		Short film
2017	Chuck Hank and the San Diego Twins	Claire	
2017	Feed	Olivia Grey	Also writer and producer
2018	We Are Here	Woman	Short film; also producer and writer
2018	Clara	Clara	
2019	Where'd You Go Bernadette	Becky	
2019	Like Turtles	Molly	Short film; also producer
2020	Life on Mars	Stella	Short film; also writer
2021	Poppet	Maeve	Short film; also producer and writer
2022	Doula	Deb	

=== Television ===
Year	Title	Role	Notes
1990	Quantum Leap	Teresa Bruckner	Episode: "Another Mother"
1992	Tequila and Bonetti	Teresa Garcia	2 episodes
1998	JAG	Erin Terry	Episode: "Tiger, Tiger"
2002	First Monday	Kimberly Baron	Episodes: "Dangerous Words" and "Strip Search"
2005–2006	NCIS	Sarah McGee	Episodes: "Red Cell" and "Twisted Sister"
2010–2017	Pretty Little Liars	Spencer Hastings	Main role
2015	Suits	Claire	Episodes: "Fork in the Road" and "Mea Culpa"
2016	Sister Cities	Baltimore Baxter	Television film
2020	Stumptown	Jenna Marshall	Episode: "Til Dex Do Us Part"
2022	Celebrity Jeopardy!	Herself	Contestant
2023	Plan B	Miranda Delano	Main role, miniseries
2025	On Call	Traci Harmon	Main role
2027	The Rookie	Stephanie Monroe	

=== Radio ===
Year	Title	Role	Notes	Ref.
2020	The Adventures of Superman	Girl	DC FanDome	

=== Web ===
Year	Title	Role	Notes
2012–2013	Lauren	Sergeant Lauren Weil	Main role
2014	Pa-gents with Chris Pine	Cathryn Crest	
2015	Instagram Intervention with Troian Bellisario	Herself	

=== Music videos ===
Year	Title	Role	Artist	Ref.
2014	"Another Story"	Girl	The Head and the Heart	
2018	"Fading Light"	Woman	Nights & Weekends	

=== Director ===
Year	Title	Episode(s)	Notes
2017	Pretty Little Liars	"In the Eye Abides the Heart"	Directorial debut
2018	Famous in Love	"Guess Who's (Not) Coming to Sundance?"	
2019–2023	Good Trouble	6 episodes	
2020	Life on Mars	—N/a	Short film
2026	The Rookie	"The Thinker"	

== Awards and nominations ==
Year	Award	Category	Work	Result	Ref.
2010	Vision Fest	Best Acting – Female Lead	Consent	Won	
2010	Philadelphia First Glance Film Festival	Best Actress	Consent	Won	
2011	Young Hollywood Awards	Cast to Watch (shared with Ashley Benson, Lucy Hale and Shay Mitchell)	Pretty Little Liars	Won	
2011	Teen Choice Awards	Choice Summer TV Star: Female	Pretty Little Liars	Nominated	
2012	Teen Choice Awards	Choice Summer TV Star: Female	Pretty Little Liars	Won	
2013	New York Festivals	Best Performance by an Actress	Lauren	Won	
2013	Streamy Awards	Best Female Performance – Drama	Lauren	Nominated	
2013	Teen Choice Awards	Choice TV Actress: Drama	Pretty Little Liars	Won	
2014	IAWTV Awards	Best Female Performance – Drama	Lauren	Nominated	
2014	Teen Choice Awards	Choice TV Actress: Drama	Pretty Little Liars	Nominated	
2015	Teen Choice Awards	Choice Summer TV Star: Female	Pretty Little Liars	Nominated	
2016	Teen Choice Awards	Choice TV Actress: Drama	Pretty Little Liars	Nominated	
2017	Teen Choice Awards	Choice TV Actress: Drama	Pretty Little Liars	Nominated	
2018	Vancouver Film Critics Circle Award	Best Actress in a Canadian Film	Clara	Nominated	
2020	Northeast Film Festival	Best Actress in a Short Film	Like Turtles	Won	
