= Beauty & the Briefcase =

2010 American film

- Promotional poster
- Genre: Romantic comedy
- Based on: Diary of a Working Girl by Daniella Brodsky
- Screenplay by: Michael Horowitz
- Directed by: Gil Junger
- Starring: Hilary Duff; Michael McMillian; Chris Carmack; Jaime Pressly; Matt Dallas; Amanda Walsh
- Composer: Danny Lux
- Country of origin: United States
- Original language: English

Production
- Producers: Hilary Duff; Richard Fischoff
- Cinematography: Greg Gardiner
- Editor: Don Brochu
- Running time: 86 minutes
- Production companies: Lion Share Productions; von Zerneck/Sertner Films; ABC Family Original Productions

Original release
- Network: ABC Family
- Release: April 18, 2010

Beauty & the Briefcase is a 2010 American romantic comedy television film directed by Gil Junger, based on the novel Diary of a Working Girl by Daniella Brodsky. The film stars Hilary Duff as a fashion journalist who works undercover to write an article on dating businessmen. It premiered on ABC Family on April 18, 2010.

== Plot ==
Lane Daniels (Hilary Duff) is an aspiring writer with a keen interest in fashion. She meets with Kate (Jaime Pressly), the primary editor at Cosmopolitan magazine, to pitch a story idea. Lane laments to Kate how difficult it is to find a good man, and lists an elaborate checklist of ideal attributes she is searching for in her ideal partner. Kate assigns Lane a mission to infiltrate the "business world" and write an article about finding a corporate man who meets all the criteria on her checklist. With a fraudulent résumé, Lane bluffs her way into getting an administrative assistant position in at a major investment firm under managing director Tom (Michael McMillian).

Lane starts work at the firm while attempting to find men to date. She sets up a date with Seth, a co-worker. Shortly afterwards, she meets Liam (Chris Carmack) at a bar on a night out with her best friend Joanne (Amanda Walsh), and is immediately impressed. He meets several qualities on her checklist, including being handsome, British, polite, and a world traveler. They go on a date, which Lane finds more romantic and interesting than the one she goes on with Seth.

Tom discovers Lane's qualifications for the job are fabricated. However, mollified by her attempts to actually complete her tasks, lets her off with a warning to stop lying and continue working. Additionally, Kate reminds Lane that her task was to date only "businessmen in suits," which Liam is not. Kate tells Lane to focus on Seth, but Lane decides to continue seeing Liam, while using the name and persona of Seth in her article.

Due to her fashion expertise, Lane is assigned to handle the visuals for an upcoming meeting with the firm's boss. Tom asks Lane to help him with a makeover before the meeting, and they spend a day shopping and spending time together.

While Lane is off to pick up mock-ups of the visuals at the printer, Tom, on returning to the office, accidentally finds Lane's article. When she returns, he angrily confronts her about her deception. She leaves, thinking she is fired. That night, while commiserating with Joanne, Lane discovers that Liam is a fraud and lied about his past as a world traveler. In reality, he works as a waiter at a restaurant.

The next day, to Lane's surprise, Tom calls her in to attend the meeting and present the visuals she created. Afterwards, Tom and Lane part, and he wishes her luck on her article.

Kate and Lane meet, and Lane is apprehensive, believing she will be fired again for not following through on her assigned story. However, she is surprised when Kate is approving of the story. Kate muses that Lane's experiences and subsequent article revealed a more compelling story of her own self-discovery. Through their conversation, Lane realizes Tom is the man she has been looking for. She runs to his office to find him, and professes her love for him. He tells her that he loves her too, and they embrace.

In a final scene, Lane's next Cosmopolitan article is called "How to Help Your Boyfriend Become More Fashion Savvy.: Tom continues to reach new successes at his job, and Lane and Tom are shown to be happy together.

== Cast ==
- Hilary Duff as Lane Daniels
- Michael McMillian as Tom Rinehart
- Chris Carmack as Liam
- Jaime Pressly as Kate White
- Matt Dallas as Seth
- Amanda Walsh as Joanne
- Kevin Kirkpatrick as John
- Brandi Coleman as Amèlie
- James McDaniel as Mr. Belmont

Cameo appearances

- Jennifer Coolidge as Felisa McCollin
- Tarik Naim Alherimi as Rodrigo Navarro
- Courtney J. Clark as Margo
- Lacey Minchew as Whitney
- Carol Sutton as recruiter
- Billy Slaughter as accountant

== Production ==
In August 2009, ABC Family announced that Hilary Duff would star in an upcoming romantic comedy for the network, which was initially titled The Business of Falling in Love. The film is based on the novel Diary of a Working Girl by Daniella Brodsky, and was adapted for television by writer Mike Horowitz. In addition to starring, Duff executive produced the film alongside Frank von Zerneck, Robert Sertner, Ira Pincus, and Jessica Horowitz.

The two-hour original film was directed by Gil Junger, and filming occurred in late 2009, with portions shot in New York City in October and in New Orleans in November.

The film had a rating of 2.4 million viewers on its April 18, 2010, broadcast and attracted a strong female audience of ages 12–34. It marks a collaboration between ABC Family and Cosmopolitan magazine, which is featured in the film.

== Home media ==
The film was released on DVD and Blu-ray in the United States on February 8, 2011.

== Awards and nominations ==
Award	Year	Category	Recipient(s)	Result	Ref.
People's Choice Awards	2011	Favorite Family TV Movie	Beauty & the Briefcase	Nominated	
