= Julie Payne (actress, born 1946) =

American actress (born 1946)

- Born: Indianapolis, Indiana, U.S.
- Education: Santa Clara University; San Francisco State University
- Occupations: Actress, singer
- Years active: 1969–present
- Spouse: Richard Reicheg

Julie Payne (born 1946) is an American television, film and stage actress who, in a career lasting over four decades, has specialized primarily in comedy roles as well as voice acting. She was a cast member in three short-lived network sitcoms during 1983–1986, and appeared in about twenty feature films and over a hundred episodes of TV series as well as providing voices for scores of TV animated shows, of which her best known character is that of Liz Wilson.

== Early life ==
Julie Payne was born in Indianapolis, Indiana, but in the early 1950s her family moved to Sweet Home, Oregon, near the lake and river areas adjoining the Cascade Range, where her father got a job as the local newspaper editor. Growing up in the state's second-largest city, Eugene, she attended South Eugene High School, where she performed in a number of school productions, including The Music Man, The Madwoman of Chaillot, The Lark and Once Upon a Mattress. After graduating in 1964, she moved to California, where she studied drama at Santa Clara University and French at San Francisco State University. Her father, Ken Payne, later became head of the English Department at Sheldon High School; her mother, Lucy Payne, was an author.

== Career ==
Leaving college without a degree, Payne traveled to Europe, where she hitchhiked through various locations and, upon returning to San Francisco during the 1967 Haight-Ashbury "Summer of Love", became a member of the improvisational comedy/satire group, The Committee, remaining with it, on and off, until 1974.

During her years with The Committee, she began appearing in films (her on-screen debut occurred as part of the group's performance at the September 1969 Big Sur Folk Festival, held a month after Woodstock, and is included in the 1971 concert film, Celebration at Big Sur).

At the start of the 1970s, she was seen in bit parts, without the group, in The Strawberry Statement and The Candidate, as well as on television (The Flip Wilson Show, The Tonight Show Starring Johnny Carson, The Midnight Special, The Streets of San Francisco and others).

In 1976, two years after leaving The Committee, she and another former member of the group, Ruth Silveira, wrote and starred in People Pie, their two-woman satirical revue which they premiered in Los Angeles and took on the road, including to Eugene, its initial stop, and her first visit to the city since leaving it in 1964.

Between February 1983 and June 1986, she was a regular in three network series, but each lasted less than three months. In CBS' hour-long 1983 humorous fantasy, Wizards and Warriors, she played good queen Lattinia, one of many characters in a large ensemble cast, but the special-effects-laden expensive series was a Saturday-night ratings failure, lasting only from February 26 to May 14. She also starred in WKRP in Cincinnati as Buffy, one of Johnny Fever's former girlfriends.

Starting in mid-1980s, Payne shifted her focus to television voice work. She was heard in the animated segments of The Tracey Ullman Show and provided various voices, primarily those of Dr. Liz Wilson and Lanolin in a series of specials based on the comic strip Garfield, as well as in the series Garfield and Friends and The Garfield Show.

In 1993, she played Embarcadero Bank worker Eleanor Cooke (AKA Former Smash Club cage dancer Ginger Snap) in the Full House episode "Smash Club: the Next Generation". Payne portrayed the recurring character of Larry David's mother-in-law on his HBO satirical comedy series, Curb Your Enthusiasm.

== Personal life ==
Payne married actor-songwriter Richard Reicheg.

== Filmography ==
=== Film ===
| Year | Title | Role | Notes |
|---|---|---|---|
| 1970 | The Strawberry Statement | Woman | |
| 1971 | THX 1138 | Announcer | Voice |
| 1972 | The Candidate | Woman | |
| 1979 | Real Life | Dr. Anne Kramer | |
| 1980 | First Family | Gloria's Secret Service Agent #3 | |
| 1981 | The Incredible Shrinking Woman | Neighbor | |
| 1983 | Private School | Coach Whelan | |
| 1983 | Twice Upon a Time | Flora Fauna | Voice |
| 1984 | The Lonely Guy | Rental Agent | |
| 1984 | This Is Spinal Tap | Mime Waitress | |
| 1985 | Fraternity Vacation | Naomi Tvedt | |
| 1986 | Just Between Friends | Karen | |
| 1986 | Jumpin' Jack Flash | Receptionist at Elizabeth Arden | |
| 1988 | Portrait of a White Marriage | Mrs. Prufrock | |
| 1989 | Uncle Buck | Additional voices | |
| 1990 | Misery | Reporter #1 | |
| 1992 | Glengarry Glen Ross | Additional voices | |
| 1994 | Monkey Trouble | Librarian | |
| 1995 | The Brady Bunch Movie | Mrs. Simmons | |
| 1996 | Spy Hard | Mother Superior | |
| 2001 | Teddy Bears' Picnic | Lila Claypool | |
| 2003 | American Wedding | Mrs. Zyskowski | |
| 2005 | Cruel but Necessary | Pearl | |

=== Television ===
| Year | Title | Role | Notes |
|---|---|---|---|
| 1973 | Love, American Style | Sylvia | Episode: "Love and the See-Through Mind" |
| 1973 | The Streets of San Francisco | Mrs. Durand | Episode: "The Twenty-Four Karat Plague" |
| 1974 | The Bob Newhart Show | Dr. Sharon Rudell | Episode: "The Great Rimpau Medical Arts Co-Op Experiment" |
| 1975 | Sanford and Son | Terestia | Episode: "The Family Man" |
| 1976 | Saturday Night Live | Sandy Locke | Episode: "Elliott Gould/Anne Murray" |
| 1977–1979 | Laverne & Shirley | Colonel Turner / Charmayne | 3 episodes |
| 1978 | Peeping Times | Amateur Surgeon | Television film |
| 1979 | WKRP in Cincinnati | Buffy Denver | 2 episodes |
| 1979 | Taxi | Sister Number One | Episode: "The Great Place" |
| 1980 | Shirley | Mrs. Burke | Episode: "Fenced In" |
| 1980 | Archie Bunker's Place | Sylvia | Episode: "Home Again" |
| 1981 | Harper Valley PTA | Doris Diefenbarker | Episode: "Stella and Howard" |
| 1982 | Hart to Hart | Nurse | Episode: "Harts and Fraud" |
| 1982 | Madame's Place | Micheline Juliette | Episode #1.38 |
| 1982 | Family Ties | Lynn Sullivan | Episode: "Oops" |
| 1983 | Prime Times | Various | Television film |
| 1983 | Wizards and Warriors | Queen Lattinia | 3 episode |
| 1983 | Full House | Mrs. Knopf | Television film |
| 1983 | Oh Madeline | Lorna | Episode: "Portrait of the Artist with a Young Man" |
| 1983 | Garfield on the Town | Dr. Liz Wilson | Television short |
| 1984 | The Duck Factory | Aggie Aylesworth | 13 episodes |
| 1984 | E/R | Mrs. Turner | Episode: "Both Sides Now" |
| 1984 | Benson | Eunice | Episode: "Make War, Not Love" |
| 1985 | Joanna | Sigourney Schultz | Television film |
| 1985 | George Burns Comedy Week | Loretta Hayes | Episode: "The Dynamite Girl" |
| 1985 | The Twilight Zone | Clerk | Episode: "Wish Bank" |
| 1985 | The History of White People in America | Irma | Television film |
| 1986 | Garfield in Paradise | Mai-Tai / Stewardess | Television short |
| 1986 | Leo & Liz in Beverly Hills | Lucille Trumbley | 6 episodes |
| 1987 | The New Gidget | Julia Genet | Episode: "Does Paul Know?" |
| 1987 | CBS Summer Playhouse | Rita | Episode: "Puppetman" |
| 1987 | This Week Indoors | Nancy Reagan | Television film |
| 1987 | The Tracey Ullman Show | Dr. N!Godatu | 6 episodes |
| 1987 | Pound Puppies | 911 Operator 1 | Episode: "The Rescue Pups/Good Night, Sweet Pups" |
| 1987 | A Garfield Christmas | Mom | Television film |
| 1988 | Crash Course | Maxine Konner | Television film |
| 1988–1994 | Garfield and Friends | Lanolin / Dr. Liz Wilson / additional voices | 85 episodes |
| 1989 | Murphy Brown | Phyllis | Episode: "It's How You Play the Game" |
| 1989 | This Is America, Charlie Brown | Mrs. Holiday | Episode: "The Great Inventors" |
| 1989 | Who's the Boss? | Skye | Episode: "It's Somebody's Birthday" |
| 1989 | Garfield's Babes and Bullets | Kitty | Television short |
| 1989 | L.A. Law | Ellen Barrett | Episode: "The Unsterile Cuckoo" |
| 1989 | Garfield's Thanksgiving | Dr. Liz Wilson | Television short |
| 1990 | Garfield's Feline Fantasies | Nadia | Television short |
| 1990 | The Adventures of Don Coyote and Sancho Panda | Additional voices | Episode: "Pity the Poor Pirate" |
| 1990 | Bagdad Cafe | County Clerk | Episode: "City on a Hill" |
| 1990–1991 | The Wonder Years | Mrs. Falcinella | 3 episodes |
| 1991 | Get a Life | Dr. Rand | Episode: "Married" |
| 1991 | Paradise | Hattie / Margaret | 2 episodes |
| 1991 | The Haunted | Annie | Television film |
| 1991 | Garfield Gets a Life | Library Girl / Receptionist | Television short |
| 1991 | Dream On | Margaret Tittlewood | Episode: "Calling the Kettle Black" |
| 1991 | The New WKRP in Cincinnati | Buffy | 2 episodes |
| 1991 | Perfect Strangers | Mrs. Johnson | Episode: "Wild Turkey" |
| 1991 | Major Dad | Mrs. Lonigan | Episode: "The Shell Game" |
| 1993 | Good Advice | Salesperson | Episode: "Pilot" |
| 1993 | Full House | Eleanor Cooke / Ginger Snap | Episode: "Smash Club: the Next Generation" |
| 1993 | Café Americain | Helene | Episode: "Deck the Halls with Boughs of Holly" |
| 1994 | Picket Fences | Juror | Episode: "System Down" |
| 1994 | Monty | Sister Stigmata | Episode: "Wild, Wild Willy and His O.K. Corral" |
| 1994–1997 | Beverly Hills, 90210 | Peggy, Arnold's Secretary | 3 episodes |
| 1995 | Aaahh!!! Real Monsters | Beautician / Monique | Episode: "A Room with No Viewfinder/Krumm Rises to the Top" |
| 1996 | Lois & Clark: The New Adventures of Superman | Wanda | Episode: "The People v. Lois Lane" |
| 1996 | California Dreams | Amber Dubois | Episode: "The Fashion Man" |
| 1998 | L.A. Doctors | Mrs. Kleming | Episode: "Nate Expectations" |
| 2000–2005 | Curb Your Enthusiasm | Cheryl's Mother | 7 episodes |
| 2004 | Judging Amy | Nancy Kolnikoff | Episode: "Predictive Neglect" |
| 2005 | NYPD Blue | Judith Howell | Episode: "Old Man Quiver" |
| 2009–2014 | The Garfield Show | Dr. Liz Wilson / Mrs. Wilson / Mrs. Arbuckle | 14 episodes |
