= 827th Tank Destroyer Battalion =

- Active: 1942–45
- Disbanded: 1945
- Country: United States
- Branch: United States Army
- Part of: Independent unit
- Equipment: M18 Hellcat
- Engagements: World War II: Operation Nordwind

The 827th Tank Destroyer Battalion was a tank destroyer battalion of the United States Army active during the Second World War. It was activated in April 1942 as a segregated African American unit, deploying to Europe at the end of 1944 and attached to 12th Armored Division. It saw action during Operation Nordwind in January 1945, where elements of the battalion performed creditably.

== Background ==
The US Army's basic wartime racial policy, established in 1937, dictated that both whites and African Americans were to be inducted into the Army in equal proportions and strength, but that they were to be assigned to segregated units. Black soldiers could be led by white officers, but not vice versa, and unit composition was to be strictly controlled by the War Department. The mix of combat and support service units was, in theory, to be roughly equal between both groups. This caused tension between the department and operational commanders, with the latter generally unwilling to provide places for black combat units. In practice, almost all combat units in the pre-war period were white.

In response to growing pressure for a more equal distribution, the White House issued a statement in October 1940 which, while reaffirming segregation, provided that, "Negro organizations will be established in each major branch of the service". The first black armored units, which had been a matter of great public interest, were activated in early 1941. Two black tank destroyer units were formed that December, as tank destroyer battalions were treated as a separate arm of service. A further five were activated in 1942, and four (in addition to two planned, but later canceled) in 1943.

== Early service ==
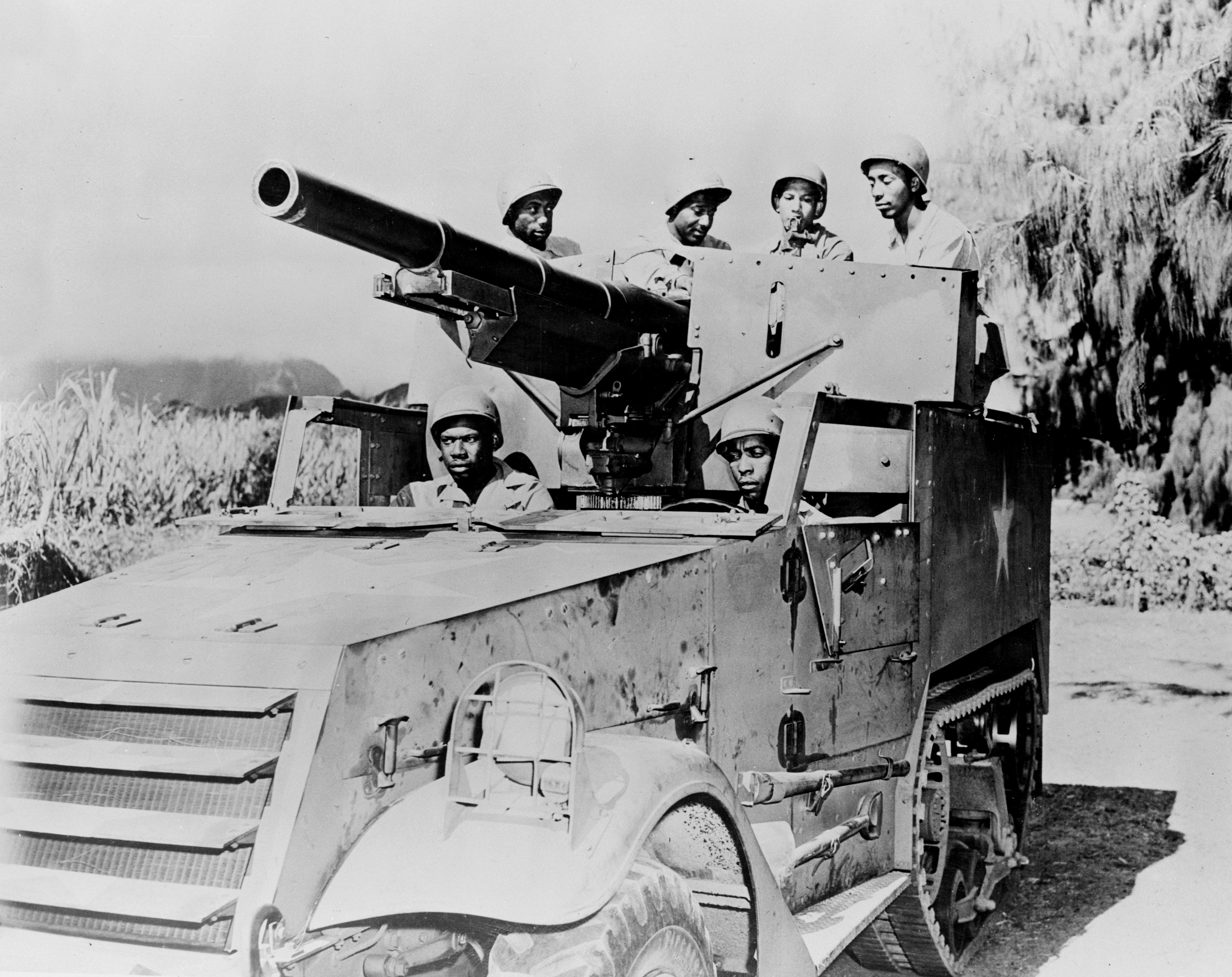
African-American soldiers from an unknown unit manning a M3 GMC halftrack during training, circa 1943.

The 827th Tank Destroyer Battalion was activated on 20 April 1942, at Camp Forrest, Tennessee, one of five such battalions created that year. Initially armed with 75 millimeters (3.0 in) M3 GMC half-tracks, it later received the self-propelled M10 tank destroyer before being reorganized as a towed battalion, equipped with trucks and 3" anti-tank guns. It finally returned to a self-propelled unit, equipped with M18 Hellcats. At no point during this constant reshuffling did the unit ever receive a full allocation of equipment. At the same time, the original officer cadre was replaced twice—first with black officers, then with white officers from other disbanded segregated battalions. By the time the battalion sailed overseas, it had seen eight separate commanding officers.

The unit emerged from these repeated reorganizations in very poor state; training was inadequate, with the unit repeatedly failing battalion competence tests, and some areas of combat training—notably indirect fire—were avoided altogether. Discipline and order within the unit was equally low—in September 1944, the battalion held two courts-martials for murder. The situation was so dire that the battalion's commander felt it was likely that he would oversee the disbanding of the battalion or its conversion into a non-combat service unit (the latter of which had already happened to a number of other segregated tank destroyer battalions).

The 827th was originally scheduled to be sent to the Pacific theater, but in February, 1944, it was declared insufficiently trained and held back for further preparation; a different unit was substituted at the last minute. The next six months did not show great improvement in quality, but nonetheless the battalion was eventually sent overseas. It arrived in Marseille in late 1944, deploying to the front in December, attached to the 12th Armored Division.

== Combat ==
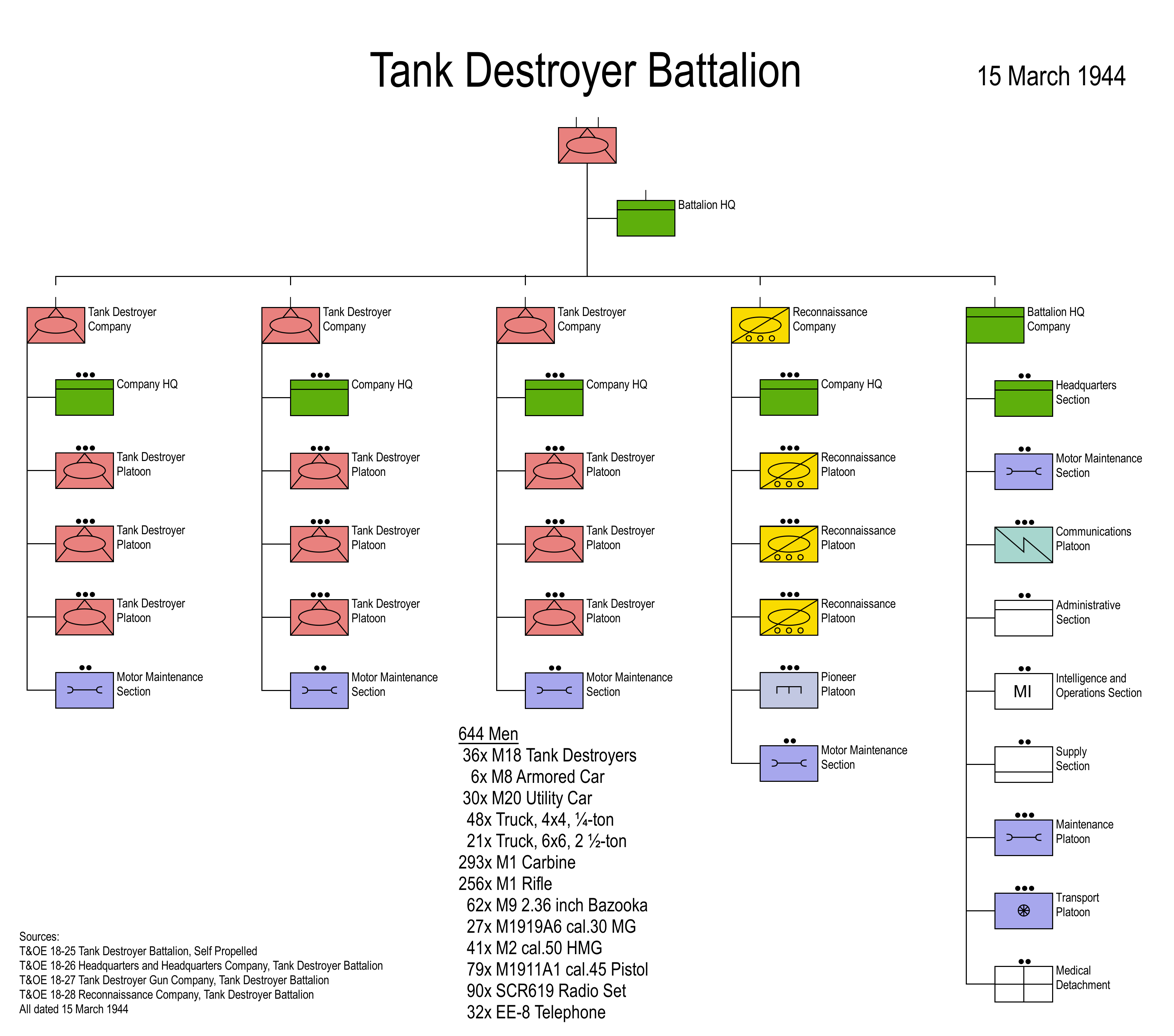
Tank Destroyer Battalion (SP) Structure - March 1944

The first portion of the 827th to be deployed for combat was a single company in support of the 714th Tank Battalion of the 12th Armored Division, on 20 December 1944. Failing to see action, the company was withdrawn to reserve after three days on the line. Discipline proved to be a problem during this period, with men abandoning their guns to collect firewood, despite assistance and advice from the 614th Tank Destroyer Battalion (an experienced and well-regarded black unit operating in the same area). A second company was used for screening purposes in the first week of January, also not seeing combat, while the remainder of the battalion narrowly avoided being assigned to an indirect-fire role it was completely unprepared for.

On 6 January, the battalion while still attached to the 12th Armored Division, was assigned to participate in Task Force Wahl led by the 79th Infantry Division, which was defending against the January, 1945, German counteroffensive in the Alsace-Lorraine region. Disciplinary problems persisted; the company ordered to lead the move was unable to deploy as most of its men were absent, and the remainder mostly drunk. By the time the battalion managed to move, one of its officers had shot a man—and been shot himself—while trying to restore order among his company, and in a separate incident a sergeant had been assaulted by one of his own men and, defending himself, accidentally shot a bystander.

The following two weeks saw a period of prolonged combat, as the task force slowly fell back to the pressure of the German offensive, with the battalion split up among various commands and often cut off or out of communication. The infantry units the tank destroyers were assigned to expected to take full operational control, often giving inappropriate orders more suited to tanks than to the lightly armored M18s, breeding resentment among the battalion's crews. At the same time, the 827th had trained with the expectation that the gunners would fire only on the direct instruction of their own officers, which limited both their ability to co-operate with outsiders and their willingness to adapt and improvise during small-scale combat. Vehicle commanders regularly argued about orders, or refused to act on them without their "own" commander present. In one case on 9 January, an infantry commander threatened to shoot a M18 crew if it did not engage a German tank stranded on the roadside.

Not all elements of the battalion suffered similar problems, however; on the same day, 9 January, B Company destroyed eleven German tanks advancing on the village of Rittershoffen, with four more the next day, while another section working with the 813th Tank Destroyer Battalion in Hatten nearby accounted for nine. These units remained with the infantry in the village for several days, unable to withdraw, and acquitted themselves well in close fighting. This was all the more of an achievement when it was considered that, leaving disciplinary problems aside, the battalion suffered from major training deficiencies and was entirely combat inexperienced. One member of the battalion was awarded the Silver Star, while the 79th Division recommended a crew which had fought in Hatten to receive Bronze Stars—it is unclear if these were ever awarded.

== Service duties ==
Following reports of disciplinary problems, VI Corps ordered an investigation, which took place over four days while elements of the battalion were still engaged at Rittershoffen. It recommended that the battalion be withdrawn and retrained before returning to combat under a new commander, while Major-General Edward H. Brooks, the corps commander, instead recommended that the battalion be entirely disbanded and its men distributed to other units. General Alexander Patch, commanding Seventh Army, agreed with Brooks, suggesting that a new tank destroyer battalion be formed from the men of service units, themselves replaced by the men of the 827th. This was contentious, however; the number and status of segregated combat units was a matter of intense political debate, and converting a black combat unit to a service one, in favor of white troops, was likely controversial.

As discussion continued, the battalion was withdrawn from the front lines, leaving Task Force Wahl on 23 January. It returned to 12th Armored Division, where three platoons were committed to combat to support the fighting in the Colmar Pocket in the first week of February. The remainder of the battalion was kept in reserve, where the disciplinary problems, including assaults on civilians, grew to the point at which the commander had to request outside assistance to restore control on 5 February. The battalion was removed from its attachment to the 12th Armored on 12 February—by request of the divisional command—and withdrawn to the rear area of XV Corps to take up guard duties.

The battalion's future had been referred to Sixth Army Group, the controlling formation, for further consideration; after some debate, they requested the investigation be reopened with a particular focus on the enlisted men of the unit. The second inspection showed that the enlisted men were broadly competent at their duties, but that most of them preferred rear-area duties over combat roles. The inspection recommended that the enlisted men be transferred to one of the segregated infantry divisions. In the event, the unit was assigned to Sixth Army Group headquarters, where it was used in a service role. It remained nominally active—to avoid the political fallout of deactivating a black combat unit—but its equipment was transferred as replacements to other battalions and the battalion itself was virtually disbanded as a combat unit.
