= Amanda Walsh =

Canadian actress

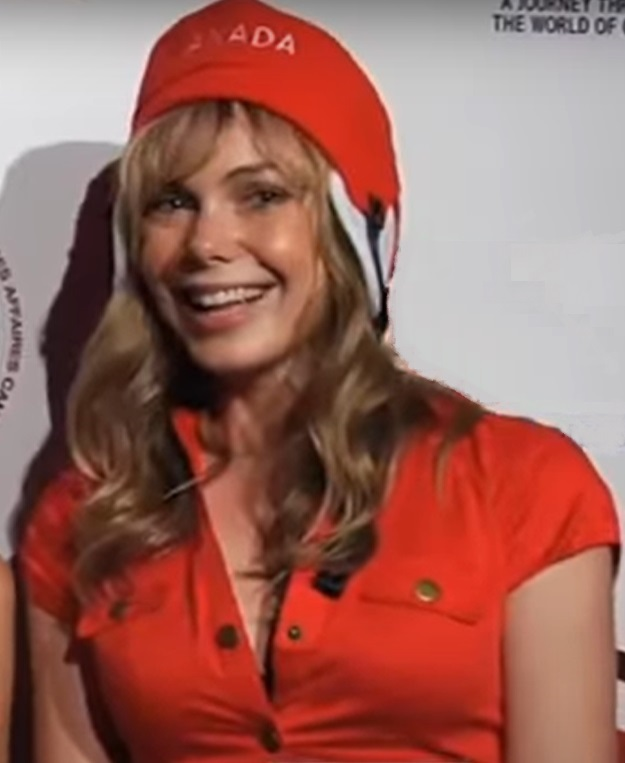
- Walsh in 2011
- Born: Amanda Walsh; Rigaud, Quebec, Canada
- Occupations: Actress, television host
- Years active: 1994–present
- Website: www.amandawalsh.net

Amanda Walsh is a Canadian actress, writer, and former VJ for the Canadian television station MuchMusic.

== Early life ==
Walsh was born in Rigaud, Quebec. She went to Hudson High School, in Hudson, Quebec.

== Career ==
Walsh began working as a professional actor at age 12. She has dabbled in sketches and stand-up comedy, with numerous TV appearances. She won a gold medal win at the 2000 Improv Games in Quebec, as a member of the "8 People" troupe. She is a graduate from John Abbott College, Creative Arts program.

=== MuchMusic ===
Walsh was encouraged to apply for the position of a MuchMusic VJ by one of the channel's producers while waiting tables in Hudson, Quebec. She applied and got the job, becoming the youngest VJ in MuchMusic history at the age of nineteen. She has hosted or co-hosted many programmes including Much Top Tens, Electric Circus, MuchOnDemand, Fandemonium and others. She left MuchMusic in 2004 to pursue an acting career.

=== 2000s work ===
Walsh made appearances on TV shows such as Smallville, Veronica Mars, and also had a minor role in the film Disturbia. In 2005, she starred opposite David Boreanaz in the movie These Girls, based on the play by Vivienne Laxdale. The movie was shown at the 2005 Toronto International Film Festival. She had a small role in the movie "Stardom (2000)" playing an overenthusiastic VJ on a parody of the Canadian music channel MuchMusic.

After moving to Los Angeles, Walsh got a starring role in the ABC mid-season replacement Sons & Daughters, which premiered in March 2006. Sons & Daughters was a semi-improvisational sitcom. The show was cancelled, with only eleven episodes created. Her portrayal of Katie in the unaired pilot for the sitcom The Big Bang Theory was not well received. However, the character was re-written and Walsh was replaced by Kaley Cuoco (as Penny) in the second pilot.

In 2007, she had a role in the ABC movie Full of It as Vicki Sanders. In 2008, Walsh had a role in the Internet series The Remnants with Ze Frank. She can be seen in the 2009 comedy film Ghosts of Girlfriends Past. In 2010, she appeared in ABC Family's Beauty and the Briefcase playing Hilary Duff's best friend Joanne. She was cast as the lead in the pilot episode for The CW's dramedy Danni Lowinski. She made appearances in the TV shows Grimm, Two and a Half Men and NCIS. In 2014–2015, she appeared in ten episodes of the TV show Lost Girl as Elizabeth Helm/Zee. In 2017, she appeared in the second season of Dirk Gently's Holistic Detective Agency in the central role of Suzie Boreton. The show was cancelled at the end of the season.

Walsh became one of the story editors for the Canadian TV comedy Schitt's Creek and wrote one of the episodes for season 1. Walsh then had a role in the 2022 film Doula. Walsh appeared in season three of the Canadian drama Pretty Hard Cases.

== Filmography ==
=== Film ===
Film
Year	Title	Role	Notes
1994	The Return of Tommy Tricker	Lead	
2000	Stardom		
2005	These Girls	Glory Lorraine	
2007	Full of It	Vicki Sanders	
2007	Disturbia	Minnie Tyco	
2007	Sex and Death 101	Stewardess Kathleen	
2008	Man Maid	Chloe Flaminghawk	
2008	WarGames: The Dead Code	Annie D'Mateo	Direct-to-video
2009	Ghosts of Girlfriends Past	Denice the Bridesmaid	
2011	The Master Cleanse	Kelly	Short film
2012	The Guilt Trip	Lisa	Uncredited
2014	Mercy	Charlotte	
2022	Doula	Gracie	

=== Television ===
Television
Year	Title	Role	Notes
1994, 1996	Are You Afraid of the Dark?	Girl / Susan Henderson	2 episodes
1997–1998	My Hometown	Kelly-Anne	4 episodes
2001	Within These Walls	Arielle	TV movie
2002–2003	Electric Circus	Host	
2004	Smallville	Mandy the Cheerleader	Season 4, episode 4: "Devoted"
2005	Ed's Night Party	—N/a	Writer - 4 episodes
2006	The Big Bang Theory	Katie	Unaired pilot
2006	Veronica Mars	Meryl	Season 3, episode 7: "Of Vice and Men"
2006–2007	Sons & Daughters	Jenna Halbert	11 episodes
2008	October Road	Lucy Fisher	Season 2, episode 9: "We Lived Like Giants"
2010	Beauty & the Briefcase	Joanne	TV movie
2011	Single White Spenny	Megan	Episode 3: "Monkey Love"
2011	Castle	Lulu, Jack's Producer	Season 4, episode 6: "Demons"
2011	Danni Lowinski	Danni Lowinski	Unaired American pilot for The CW
2012	Grimm	Natalie Havershaw	Season 1, episode 9: "Of Mouse and Man"
2012	NCIS	Ellen Roberts	Season 10, episode 3: "Phoenix"
2012	Two and a Half Men	Dawn	Season 10, episode 5: "That's Not What They Call It in Amsterdam"
2012	Rebounding	Taryn	TV movie
2012	Comedy Bar	Ingrid	2 episodes
2013	The Mob Doctor	Chloe	Episode 12: "Resurrection"
2014–2015	Lost Girl	Zee / Elizabeth Helm	9 episodes
2015	WTF America	Erica	TV movie
2015–2016	These People	Marilyn	TV shorts Writer - 1 episode
2015–2016	Schitt's Creek	—N/a	Writer - 1 episode Story editor - 26 episodes
2017	Curb Your Enthusiasm	Real Estate Agent	Season 9, episode 4: "Running with the Bulls"
2017	Dirk Gently's Holistic Detective Agency	Suzie Boreton	10 episodes
2018	72 Dangerous Animals: Asia	—N/a	Writer - 1 episode
2019	Into the Dark	Gwen Rake	Season 1, episode 6: "Treehouse"
2022	Sloppy Jones	—N/a	Executive producer - 5 episodes
2023	Pretty Hard Cases	Ro Wells	2 episodes
