= Prime Times =

1983 comedy television pilot

- Genre: Comedy
- Written by: Lewis Arquette; Elayne Boosler; Carmen Finestra; Peter Elbing
- Directed by: Howard Storm
- Starring: Leslie Nielsen; Lewis Arquette; Thom Bray; Hamilton Camp; Jan Hooks; Julie Payne; Deborah Pratt
- Country of origin: United States
- No. of episodes: 1

Original release
- Release: April 4, 1983

Prime Times is a 1983 American comedy television pilot starring Leslie Nielsen. The pilot spoofs "television's past, present and imagined future" via sketches that utilize footage from old television series.
