= Fandemonium (game show) =

- Genre: Reality television
- Created by: Michael Krupat; Dave Noll
- Presented by: George Stroumboulopoulos; Amanda Walsh
- Country of origin: Canada
- Original language: English
- No. of seasons: 1
- No. of episodes: 20

Production
- Running time: 22 minutes
- Production company: City Lights Television

Original release
- Network: MuchMusic
- Release: 1 August 2004 – 1 January 2005

Fandemonium is a reality television series created and aired on a music video TV channel MuchMusic. It was hosted by one of the MuchMusic VJs, either George Stroumboulopoulos and Amanda Walsh. The series concept is that two fans of a music artist celebrity that claim they are the celebrity's biggest fan, have to compete in a series of tasks in an obstacle course which only one will win in order to prove that they really are the celebrity's number one fan. At the end of each episode, the winner has the choice of selecting 2 boxes, only one of which contains a trip and various prizes, or walking away with an electronic system without having to make any choice. Only one episode of the program featured a guest appearance by the actual music celebrities of the contestants' dreams – Sum 41. In a surprise twist, the band members of Sum 41 appeared halfway through the show for a paintball competition with the two contestants (Keegan and Liz), and hung around providing commentary and support for the two challengers for the rest of the episode.
