= Doula (film) =

- Directed by: Cheryl Nichols
- Written by: Arron Shiver
- Produced by: Chris Pine; Ian Gotler; Erin Fahey; Anabella Casanova; Sage Price
- Starring: Troian Bellisario; Arron Shiver; Will Greenberg; Chris Pine
- Cinematography: Drew Bienemann
- Edited by: F. Rocky Jameson; Nadav Heyman
- Music by: Stefan Skarbek
- Production companies: Barry Linen Motion Pictures; Vacation Theory
- Distributed by: Universal Pictures
- Release date: April 20, 2022 (Seattle)
- Running time: 105 minutes
- Country: United States
- Language: English

Doula is a 2022 American comedy film written by Arron Shiver, directed by Cheryl Nichols and starring Troian Bellisario, Shiver, Will Greenberg and Chris Pine.

== Plot ==
Basketball coach Deb is expecting her first child with her artist boyfriend Silvio. Their seasoned doula Penka temporarily lives with the couple as they prepare for the birth. During a guided meditation, Deb and Silvio discover Penka has died. While attending her funeral, they see Penka's only child Sascha. While at the house to collect his mother's things, Sascha reminisces about his mother and how they both became doulas. Leading to Silvio inviting him to stay as he still wants Deb to give birth at home. Although Deb is uneasy about having a stranger around, she agrees.

With Silvio often away for work and Deb on maternity leave, she and Sascha spend a lot of time together. Even going to a prenatal appointment where Deb learns she's having a boy. Her doctor also encourages her to have a hospital delivery. Sascha assures Deb that he won't stop her from going to the hospital if that's what she wants as it's his job to support her. Later at the house, Sascha accepts a video call from Will, Silvio's teenage son who is out-of-state. Deb speaks with him for the first time, and learns that Will is going to be living with them soon. She confronts Silvio over making such a big decision without asking her. She later tells her mother's group how she doesn't feel like a person anymore, and is worried that she will be an afterthought with Will and the baby in the house.

Following a birth simulation led by Sascha, Silvio breaks down and reveals that Will almost died during his hospital birth. Deb is sympathetic, but remains firm that how she has the baby is her decision. Silvio increasingly becomes annoyed at Sascha's presence at the house and; even briefly firing him while the three are at the park. It also comes out that Silvio will be leaving the following day to pick Will up despite Deb being close to her due date. Deb kicks him out of the house in response.

After drinking wine and throwing up, Deb admits to Sascha that she's scared she won't love her baby. She begins having contractions, and goes to the hospital. Her doctor wants to give her Pitocin, but she ultimately decides to deliver at home. Silvio returns around the same time; feeling more clearheaded about his life after taking hallucinogenic mushrooms. Following the birth, the midwife notices Deb is bleeding and urges them to call for an ambulance. Deb later wakes up at the hospital to Silvio holding their newborn daughter. While Deb is relieved to no longer be pregnant, Sascha tells them that the hardest part (i.e., being parents) has now begun.

== Cast ==
- Troian Bellisario as Deb
- Arron Shiver as Silvio
- Will Greenberg as Sascha
- Robert Baker as Tony
- Anne Gee Byrd as Tammi
- Chris Pine as Dr. Gregory Zonkowski
- Amanda Walsh as Gracie
- Ally Maki as Katherine
- Elyse Levesque as Janet
- Alex McKenna as Aranrhod
- Leslie Murphy as Chelsea
- Deanna Mustard as Natasha

== Release ==
The film premiered at the Seattle International Film Festival on April 20, 2022, and was initially going to be released to digital and on-demand on June 20, 2022. The digital and on-demand release date was moved to June 28, 2022.

== Reception ==
Barbara Shulgasser of Common Sense Media awarded the film three stars out of five.

Michael Nordine of Variety gave the film a negative review and wrote, "...it’s rare for a star of (Chris Pine)'s level to be involved with such a small, intimate project, and there’s little doubt that Doula was a labor of love. Even so, the film rarely being ha-ha funny makes it drag."

Jeannette Catsoulis of The New York Times gave the film a positive review and wrote, "The running time is too long, and the finale’s screaming too prolonged; but, unlike childbirth, this good-natured movie delivers a dry, funny and utterly painless experience."
