= Deborah Pratt =

American actress, writer and producer

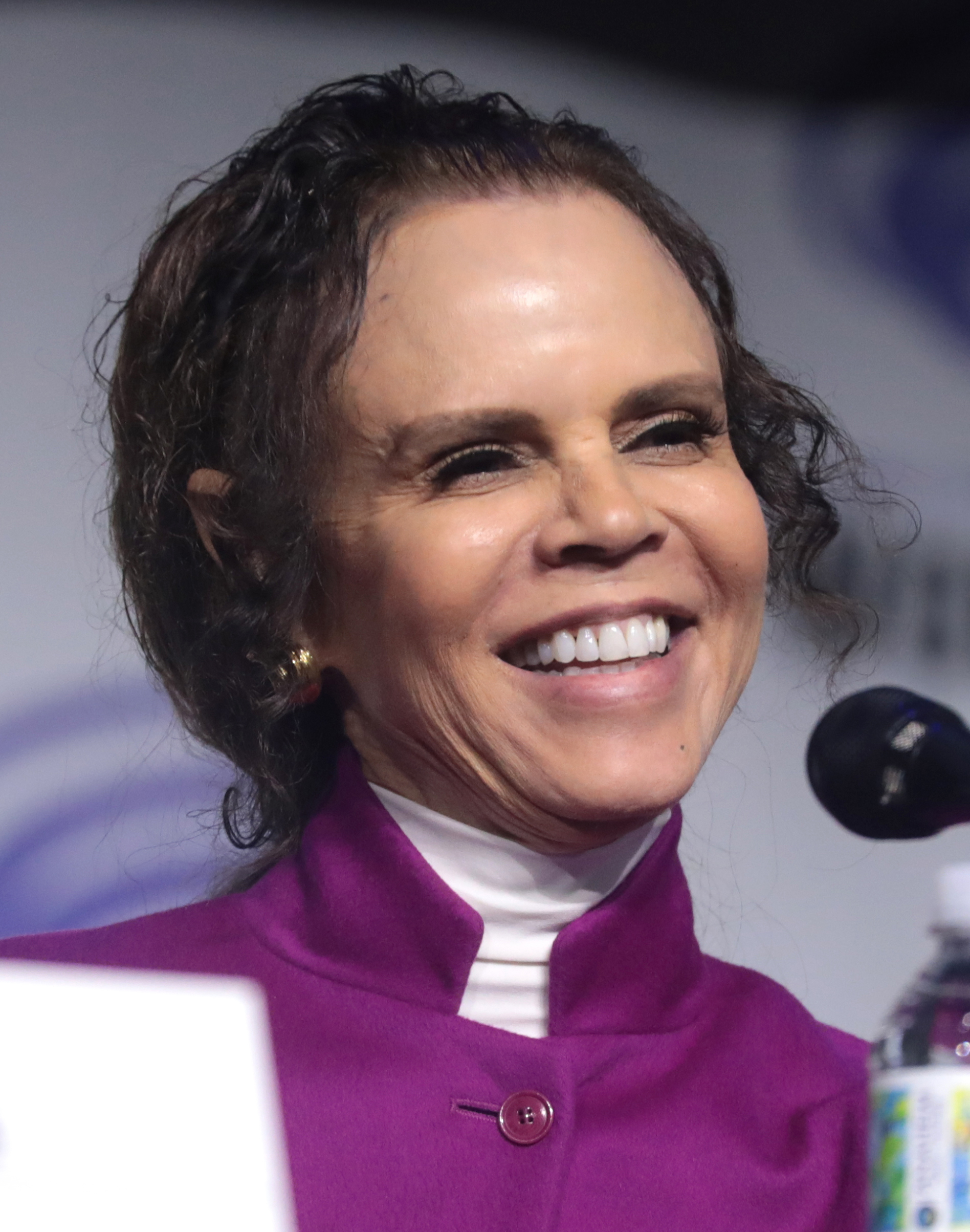
- Born: Chicago, Illinois, U.S.
- Other name: Deborah Pratt-Bellisario
- Education: Webster University
- Occupations: Actress; writer; producer; director
- Years active: 1975–present
- Spouse: Donald P. Bellisario (m. 1984; div. 1991)
- Children: 2, including Troian Bellisario

Deborah Pratt is an American director, writer, television producer and actress.

== Early life ==
Pratt was born and raised in Chicago, Illinois, to an African American family. She is the daughter of Geraldine Marian (née Bryant), a teacher, and Col. Bertram Roberson Pratt, a vice president of Pullman Heritage Bank. Colonel Pratt commanded the segregated 827th Tank Destroyer Battalion in Europe during the Second World War and later served in the Illinois National Guard. Pratt has four sisters.

Pratt earned a degree in Psychology from Webster University and studied Theatre at The Conservatory of Theatre Arts.

== Career ==
Pratt started performing on stage in Chicago theatre. Deborah's talent was discovered through a nationwide search that brought her to Los Angeles under contract to NBC, singing and dancing, on The Dean Martin Show with The Golddiggers. She sang and danced with Gene Kelly, Donald O'Connor, and toured with Debbie Reynolds. Pratt acted in various television series, including Magnum, P.I., Happy Days, The New Odd Couple, Benson, and Airwolf. She started her writing career creating multiple episodes for Magnum P.I. and Airwolf, and starred in three pilots, Katmandu, She's With Me, and Phyl & Mikhy. Pratt also acted in feature films, some of which include Exit to Eden, Last Rites, and the cult classic, Spacehunter: Adventures in the Forbidden Zone.

Pratt became showrunner—co-creator, executive producer, and head writer—for the Quantum Leap TV series, which was created by her then-husband, Donald Bellisario. Pratt also frequently starred in the show as both the narrator and the voice of Ziggy.

In 1992, Pratt served as executive producer and co-showrunner for Tequila and Bonetti on CBS. In 1998-1999, Pratt developed the series for TV and was showrunner and executive producer of The Net for CBS. In 2000, she made her directorial debut with Cora Unashamed for Masterpiece Theatre's The American Collection. In 2009, she reprised her role as Ziggy for the Quantum Leap fan film, A Leap to Di For. And as of 2022, Deborah returned as executive producer on the Quantum Leap reboot (2022-present) for NBC Universal and Peacock.

Pratt has directed shorts, a TV movie, and a Grey's Anatomy episode after Quantum Leap, but head writer duties kept her from directing her own show. Pratt directed the "Family Style" episode (air date of February 27, 2023) of the Quantum Leap reboot.

Pratt is a published novelist, having written The Vision Quest (a three-book science fiction/fantasy series) and Age of Eve, as well as an inspirational speaker. She has also sold feature scripts to major studios. Pratt is currently working on a play in development for the London stage, Joseph Bologne, as well as a graphic novel, interactive game, and interactive television series all entitled Warrior One.

She has received numerous awards for her work, including five Emmy Awards nominations, a Golden Block Award, and multiple festival awards for her short films. Pratt is also an advocate for women and minority rights in the industry. She has served on the Board of Directors of the Writers Guild of America and is on multiple committees at the Directors Guild of America. She is a member of the Producers Guild of America and SAG/AFTRA.

== Filmography ==
=== Film ===
Year	Title	Role	Notes
1981	Elephant Parts	Player	
1983	Spacehunter: Adventures in the Forbidden Zone	Meagan	
1988	Last Rites	Robin Dwyer	
1994	Exit to Eden	Dr. Allison	
2006	Unspoken	Madison	
2008	Chinaman's Chance: America's Other Slaves	Rachel	
2010	Peep World	Cassandra Williamson	
2022	Doula	Deb's Mother	

=== Television ===
Year	Title	Role	Notes
1973	The Dean Martin Show	Golddigger	Episode: "Celebrity Roast: Monty Hall"
1975	Police Woman	Kate	Episode: "Pattern for Evil"
1978	CHiPs	Carol	Episode: "Crash Diet"
1978	Love Is Not Enough	Susan	Television Film
1979	Happy Days	Kat Mandu	Episode: "Fonzie Meets Kat"
1980	Phyl & Mikhy	Connie	Episode: "Phyl's Wedding"
1980	Katmandu	Kat Mandu	Television Film
1981	Grambling's White Tiger	Jennifer	Television Film
1982	Strike Force	Loretta	Episode: "Humiliation"
1982	She's with Me	Bonnie Madison	Television Film
1982	The New Odd Couple	Sandra	Episode: "The Odd Triangle"
1983	Prime Times	Various	Television Film
1983	Benson	Jill Fletcher	Episode: "Who's Arnold?"
1983	Gimme a Break!	Vanessa	Episode: "The Way to a Man's Heart"
1984	Days of Our Lives	Lacey Parker	6 Episodes
1984	Magnum, P.I. (1980)	Gloria	4 Episodes
1984	Airwolf	Writer	1 Episode
1984–1985	Airwolf	Marella	14 Episodes
1984-1985	Magnum, P.I. (1980)	Writer	2 Episodes
1987	Three on a Match	Sissy	Television Film
1987	Hunter	Sandra Browning	Episode: "Flashpoint"
1989	Magnum, P.I. (1980)	Writer	2 Episodes
1989–1993	Quantum Leap (1989)	Writer	20 Episodes
1989–1993	Quantum Leap (1989)	Co-Executive Producer/ Supervising Producer	97 Episodes
1989–1993	Quantum Leap (1989)	Narrator / Ziggy / Troian Claridge	65 Episodes
1992	Tequila and Bonetti	Nicole	Episode: "A Perfect Match"
1992	Tequila and Bonetti	Co-Executive Producer/Producer	2 Episodes
1997	Girlfriends	Director/Writer/Producer	Short
1998–1999	The Net	Developed/Writer/Creator/Executive Producer/Director	8 Episodes
1999	Our Friend, Martin	Producer/Screenplay	Animated TV Film
2000	Cora Unshamed | BBC Masterpiece Theatre The America Collection	Director	Television Film
2016	Game of Chance (TV Series)	Executive Producer	4 Episodes
2016	Game of Chance (Video)	Writer/Executive Producer/Director	Video Short
2020	Grey's Anatomy	Director	Episode: "Put On a Happy Face" (Ep. 1621)
2022–2024	Quantum Leap (2022)	Executive Producer	18 Episodes
2022–2024	Quantum Leap (2022)	Ziggy	2 Episodes
2023	Quantum Leap (2022)	Director	Episode: "Family Style" (Ep. 113)

== Bibliography ==
Year	Title	Publisher
2013	Age of Eve: Return of the Nephilim	BroadLit
2015	The Atlantian: The Vision Quest, Book 1	VGM Publishing
2017	The Academy: The Vision Quest, Book 2	VGM Publishing
2017	The Odyssey: The Vision Quest, Book 3	VGM Publishing
TBD	Mirrors: The Dragon Mirror	VGM Publishing

== Discography ==
Year	Title	Project
1988	"All My Life"	Last Rites (Movie)
1991	"The Alphabet Rap"	Quantum Leap (TV Series)

== Awards ==
Year	Nom. /Win	Award	Project	Title
1990	Women In Film (Win)	Lillian Gish	Quantum Leap	Episode:"The Color of Truth"
1991	Writing (Win)	The Golden Block Award	Quantum Leap	Episode:"Private Dancer"
1991	Writing (Win)	The Angel Award	Quantum Leap	Episode:"Private Dancer"
1990-1993	Best Dramatic TV Series (5 Nominees)	Emmy	Quantum Leap	
1990-1993	Producing (5 Nominees)	B.E.N. Awards (Black Emmy Nominee)	Quantum Leap	
1999	Writing (5 Nominees)	Emmy	Animated TV Film	Our Friend, Martin
1999	Writing (5 Nominees)	B.E.N. Awards (Black Emmy Nominee)	Animated TV Film	Our Friend, Martin
