= Clara (2018 film) =

2018 romantic science fiction film directed by Akash Sherman

- Film poster
- Directed by: Akash Sherman
- Written by: Akash Sherman; James Ewasiuk
- Produced by: Ari Lantos
- Starring: Patrick J. Adams; Troian Bellisario
- Cinematography: Nick Haight
- Edited by: Matt Lyon
- Music by: Jonathan Kawchuk
- Production companies: Serendipity Point Films; Distant Horizon
- Distributed by: D Films (Canada; theatrical release); Serendipity Point Films (International); A24 (United States)
- Release date: 10 September 2018 (TIFF)
- Running time: 105 minutes
- Countries: Canada, United Kingdom
- Language: English

Clara is a 2018 Canadian-British science fiction film and the second feature film directed by Akash Sherman. The film stars husband and wife performers Patrick J. Adams and Troian Bellisario, playing astrophysicist Isaac and itinerant artist Clara, who become close while searching for signs of intelligent life in the universe.

The film received mixed reviews from critics.

== Plot ==
Dr. Isaac Bruno holds a postdoctoral research fellowship in astrophysics at (fictional) Ontario University, in Toronto. His goal of finding signs of intelligent life in the universe has become an obsession, linked to an unspecified trauma in his personal life two years earlier. He has become increasingly antagonistic towards his students and has taken to misappropriating time on ground-based telescopes in Chile, intended for a colleague's research. His department head suspends him, denying him any access to the school's research facilities.

The TESS orbiting telescope is launched, providing enormous amounts of data that is shared with the world, in a community effort to analyze and find possible life on exoplanets. Isaac posts flyers looking for an unpaid research assistant, offering nothing but room and board. His only response is from Clara, an uneducated artist who has lived a Bohemian lifestyle. Clara has her own secrets, seen taking some type of medicine for an unspecified illness.

Isaac focuses on results from M dwarf stars, believing it to be a niche that no one else will bother with. When Clara finds a promising exoplanet, Isaac sneaks into the university in the night and lies to the telescope operators in Chile, claiming to have permission from his friend Charlie, to get more data on the planet.

Charlie is furious, but also intrigued by the data results. He advises Isaac to contact Rebecca, Isaac's ex-wife, who holds an endowed chair at Caltech. Clara convinces Isaac to contact Rebecca, despite his reluctance. The upheaval in their lives is finally revealed, when Rebecca tells Isaac that finding life will not bring back their dead baby son. She gets him some time on the Keck telescope. This results in proving that they have found a habitable planet candidate.

Clara is falling in love with Isaac, but he has become jaded about love or anything else that cannot be scientifically proven. She kisses him, then abruptly backs off when he starts to respond. After Charlie's wife delivers a baby at the hospital, Isaac muses dejectedly that the entire universe is a "cosmic accident" based on luck, with one minuscule variation being able to alter existence of an atom, a planet, or indeed his own son. Clara reminds him that those same changes did result in the universe going the way it went and in his son existing at all - and that the atoms making up his son's body aren't gone, but have only changed. After that Isaac and Clara finally become a couple.

When they learn that someone else discovered "their" planet a week before them, Isaac becomes initially despondent, but then decides to focus on detecting signs of an evolved civilisation affecting its environment as evidence of existence of an advanced species, rather than finding just a potentially habitable planet. In his obsession, he is blind to Clara's declining health, until Charlie chastises him. When Isaac tells Clara it is time for him to stop his search, she makes him set up a virtual map of the universe from the released batches of TESS data and then pick a star, trusting to his inner connection to the universe instead of focusing on data. Isaac picks a spot on the map not covered by the available data; in his anger and frustration he accuses Clara of planning to leave him and never intending to make their relationship permanent. Deeply upset and offended, Clara grabs her bag to leave - and collapses.

At the hospital, it is revealed that Clara has an autoimmune disease that has been causing the breakdown of internal organs and muscle wasting in her body; the doctor is surprised that in her condition she can walk or even talk. Isaac stays at her bedside until there's a sudden deterioration in her state. Moments before she dies, she tells him: "I wish I could see your face when you see it."

When a new batch of TESS data is released, Isaac finds that the spot he picked previously on the map of the universe is now covered by the data, with the celestial object at that location exhibiting anomalies in its coincident orbit around an exoplanet - proof of that object being artificial and its orbit being intentionally maintained. He takes his findings to Charlie, who introduces him to Dr. Rickman, head of the TESS project. Two years later, at a press conference at the JPL, Dr. Rickman, Rebecca and Charlie explain that the data gathered now conclusively proves the existence of the artificial object, orbiting a star 200 light years distant, in turn proving the existence of intelligent alien life. Isaac is not in his assigned seat on the panel, choosing instead to spend time reminiscing about Clara.

A few months later, Rebecca summons Isaac to the SETI laboratory. She reveals that the aliens have sent a message "Isaac Bruno" in Morse code. He is present when the next message arrives - an audio file of a Bob Dylan song that he and Clara listened to together. The film ends with Isaac smiling through his tears and saying "Thank you."

== Cast ==
- Patrick J. Adams as Dr. Isaac Bruno
- Troian Bellisario as Clara
- Ennis Esmer as Dr. Charlie Durant
- Kristen Hager as Dr. Rebecca Jenkins
- R. H. Thomson as Dr. Rickman
- Jennifer Dale as Astrophysics Department Head
- Tanner Zipchen as Bar Patron

== Themes ==
Victor Stiff summarizes Clara's main themes, which are "life's big questions": the nature of existence, human purpose, and "our need to connect with others." The film asks us to consider the infinite, "but not before looking inward."

=== "Are we alone?": existential longing ===
Clara is most simply described as a story about "space and love": space, in the sense of "this search for life among the stars" (the title itself was chosen because it means "clear" and "bright," like a star), and love as it relates to bereavement: "As I was writing this film, I went through a very personal loss. I lost my grandfather."

=== "We are not alone": science and spirituality ===
Sherman approaches the idea of life beyond Earth from both a scientific perspective from "a place of spirituality" in thinking that "there might be something out there... we're not alone", and, in an interview, he references Neil deGrasse Tyson looking up at the sky and "feeling a type of connectivity that's almost spiritual."

== Genre ==
Sherman calls the film a "high concept" science fiction drama. He does not consider it a romance, but anticipated it would be marketed that way "because the lead actors are married in real life"; it is a love story to the extent that there is "a binding bond between two characters" who are "just two people connecting for a bit." Jim Slotek disagrees: "Sherman's objections notwithstanding, Clara is a romance, albeit an interrupted one — kind of what you'd get if you crossed Carl Sagan's Contact with Erich Segal's Love Story."

== Production ==
=== Background ===
At age 18, Sherman competed in the CineCoup Film Accelerator at the Banff World Media Festival, where he won second place and attracted the attention of producer Ari Lantos. Lantos immediately recognized a "visionary talent he needed to support".

Sherman studied at Ryerson University's film school for one year, where one day, at 19, he became determined to write a story, shutting himself in his dormitory room for seven hours.

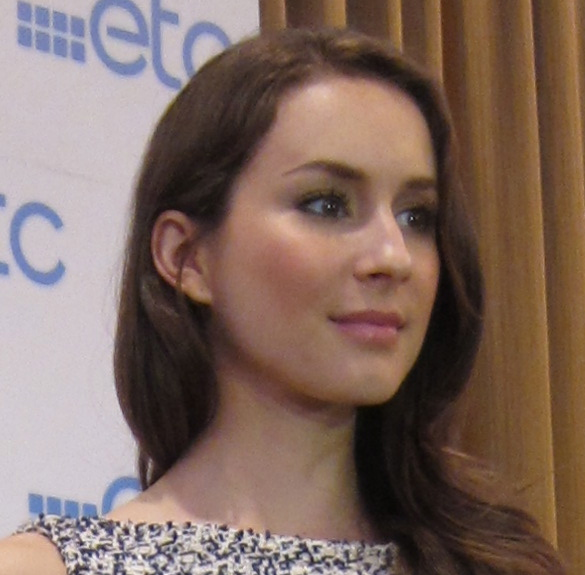
Troian Bellisario

=== Writing and development ===
Friends Sherman made at Ryerson worked with him on his debut, The Rocket List, "made on no budget ... on a four-day road trip with a camera," as well as on Clara. Together with James Ewasiuk, a "close collaborator" who co-wrote The Rocket List with him, Sherman did four months of research on "the Kepler telescope and transits and things like that." Two years after they had met in Banff, Sherman ran into Lantos while pitching the draft script to Serendipity Point Films, from whom he received an option agreement the next day.

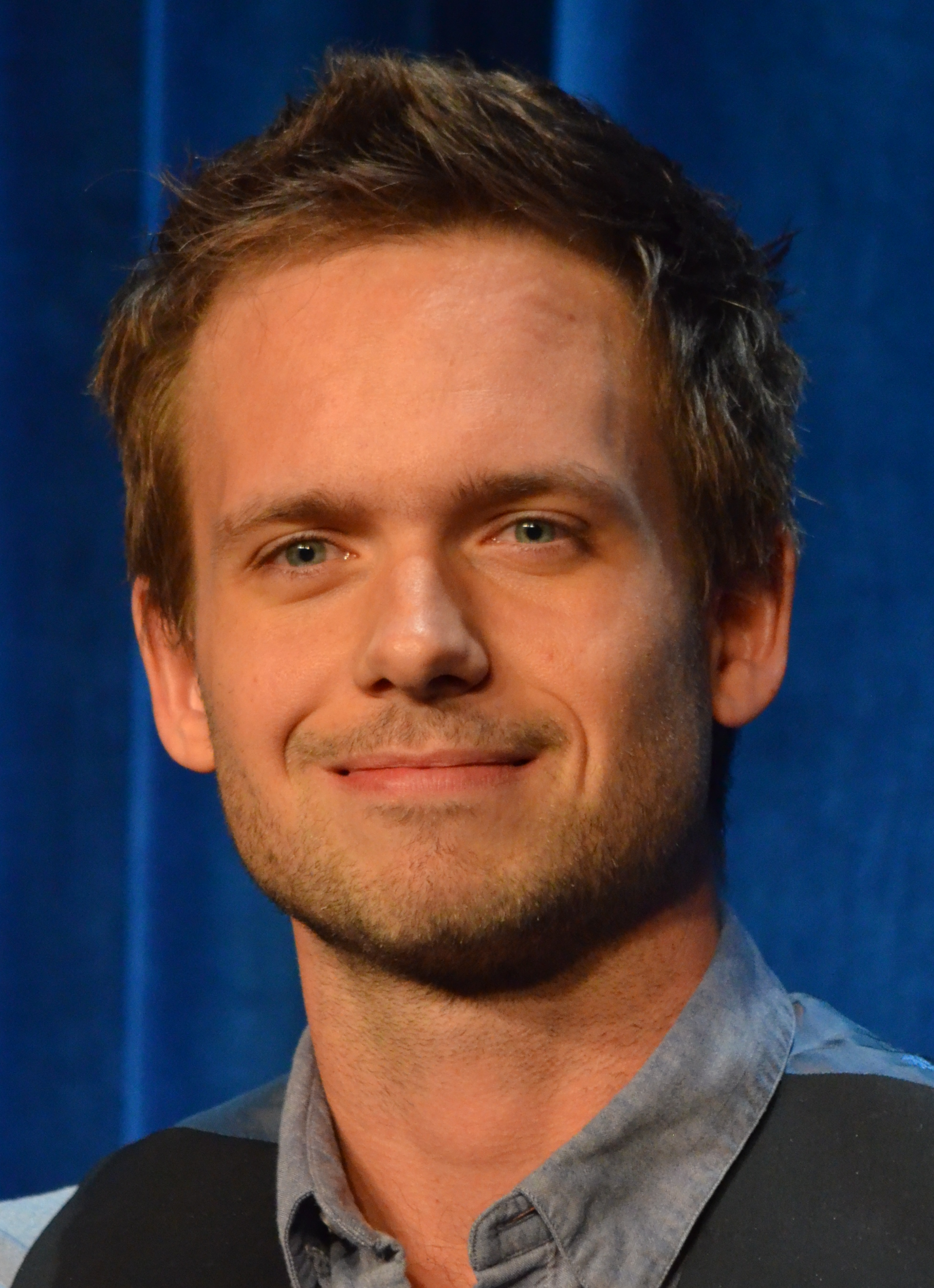
Patrick J. Adams

Both leads also contributed ideas. Patrick Adams was involved with the project from an early stage, giving feedback to Sherman on his script, on character in particular, which the director began revising in earnest at age 20 and finished two years later. Troian Bellisario provided "a similar depth for her character," and suggested a different ending for the film, a note which Sherman accepted: "I had a different ending in mind, which I don't want to share because it's not as good." It was Bellisario who brought up quantum entanglement for one of the earlier drafts.

==== Characterization ====
The character Isaac in the film is dealing with a loss so deep that he is "giving up on the universe". Adams pushed Sherman to allow him and Bellisario to explore that loss "to its limits": "Akash had done such a good job of setting the framework in the initial script I had read, but then the depths of how far these characters had gone and could go wasn't quite there yet... you've built this. Let's get in there and go deep. We discussed some of the ways and how deep that could go and how bad it could get."

==== Realism and consultation with scientists ====
The project relied on three scientific advisors, Canadian astrophysicists John Moores and Doug Welch, at York and McMaster universities respectively, and Barth Netterfield of the University of Toronto. Sherman and producer Ari Santos sent out an e-mail to Toronto-area physics and astronomy departments asking for help. Welch responded because there was so much "real science" in Sherman's script. During preproduction Welch spent time with Sherman, Adams, and Bellisario, explaining such concepts as the Fermi paradox and the Drake equation in relation to the mechanics of astronomical observing, and later also suggested some dialogue exchanges. According to Sherman, almost everything was vetted by the three consultants. "It's so vetted, in fact, that the climactic discovery in the movie... turned out to be an original idea", later published by the American Astronomical Society.

=== Financing ===
Clara was produced by Serendipity Point in association with London-based Distant Horizon, with the support of Telefilm Canada, the Ontario Media Development Corporation (Ontario Creates), the CBC, and Bell Media's TMN.

=== Filming ===
Principal photography took place in Toronto and surrounding areas during the month of March in 2017. Leads Adams and Bellisario were married a little earlier, and spent a large portion of their honeymoon working on the film.

==== Locations ====
Locations included Sherman's alma mater Toronto Metropolitan University (formerly Ryerson) and the Mississauga campus of the University of Toronto for several NASA scenes, because of their "spectacular buildings". There are also outdoor scenes shot near Sugar Beach, while a shot of the exterior of the McLaughlin Planetarium in Toronto was not included in the final cut of the theatrical release.

==== Visual effects and scientific accuracy ====
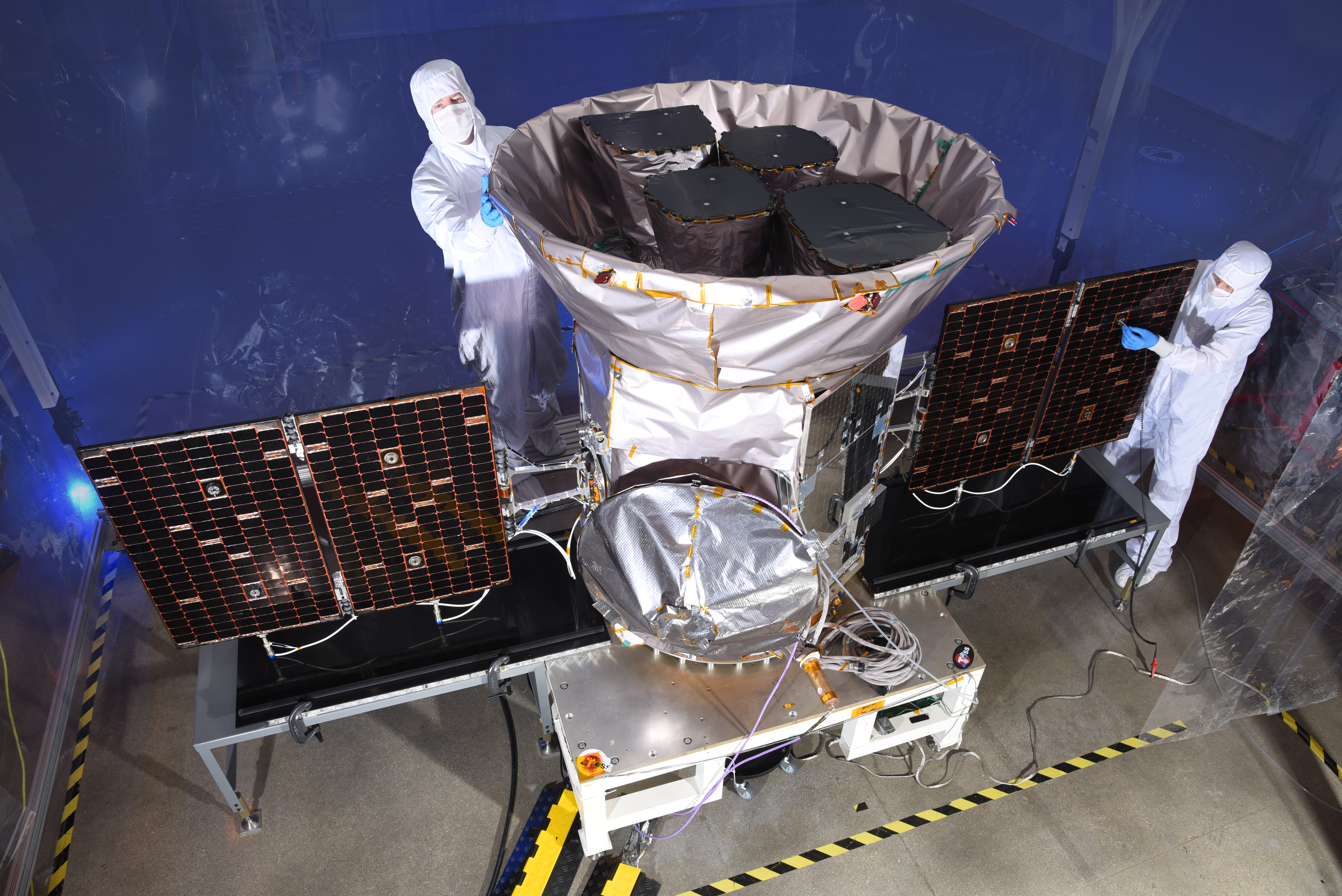
TESS with technicians, prior to its April 2018 launch

The detection method and the specialized telescopes depicted in Clara are not fictional. The TESS space telescope is a 2018 upgrade of the Kepler Telescope which was used to discover over 4000 exoplanets in the decade since 2009. Sherman started his filmmaking career as a visual effects artist and film editor, and all such VFX shots in the film were made by him rather than by his cinematographer, sourced from NASA: shots of planets transiting a sun come from the Solar Dynamics Observatory; shots of nebulae come from the Hubble Space Telescope: "I really wanted to show space honestly and in a way that would look familiar to people working in the field."

=== Music ===
Composer Jonathan Kawchuk wrote a "soft score", complementing musical selections by Bob Dylan. Kawchuk converted sounds from NASA's Voyager spacecraft into a synthesizer, sounds which were "baked into a lot of the tracks."

== Marketing and related works ==
Lantos said that Clara was aimed at teenagers and women in their twenties, and science fiction fans in general. The film's trailer was uploaded to YouTube on 3 August 2018. Sherman gave a talk in advance of the film's premiere on the science behind the film at the Astronomy On Tap event in Toronto on 17 August 2018.

Isaac and Clara's use of publicly available data from NASA's TESS led to a "Clara-inspired academic paper" written by Welch and Moores and published in Research Notes of the American Astronomical Society. The article, titled "Simulating Transits at the L1 Point", shares credit with Sherman. Welch describes the relevant part of the film and the published paper:

Near the end, when the characters are going over graphs of a star's light dimming from a transiting planet, there is a nice lump on the graph that draws the eye—an object or artifact that becomes a very important plot point. Well, John Moores and I had figured out how such an object would appear in actual data, and that's part of what we ended up submitting as a paper. During the time we were developing this there was someone else, the astrophysicist Eric Gaidos, who also wrote a paper of a similar nature showing that our description was correct.

== Release ==
Clara premiered at the 2018 Toronto International Film Festival. This was followed by a Canadian limited theatrical release.

=== Distribution ===
D Films was responsible for Clara's Canadian theatrical distribution, while the CBC holds the television broadcast rights, and TMN holds the pay TV rights and Serendipity Point Films' rest of the distribution. In February 2019, the United States film rights were acquired by Screen Media Films for a limited theatrical release in May, in a deal negotiated with SVP Worldwide Acquisitions.

=== Home media and streaming ===
Clara is available on DVD from Screen Media Video and Blu-ray.

The film is available on video on demand platforms such as Amazon Prime.

== Reception ==
=== Critical response ===
Clara has an approval rating of 54% on Rotten Tomatoes, based on 26 reviews. On Metacritic, which uses a weighted score, the film has a score of 43 out of 100, based on six reviews.

Writing for The Hollywood Reporter, Frank Scheck finds Clara dry and academic, slow moving, the dialogue full of platitudes, and feels there is no chemistry between the married leads. Assigning the film 2 stars at RogerEbert.com, Peter Sobczynski called the film "peculiar and largely unsatisfying" despite the ambitions displayed by Akash Sherman: "the result is a weird muddle that's both too silly to be taken seriously and too staid to completely go off the beaten path." Toronto critic Norman Wilner, writing for Now, though conceding the film has its moments, feels that the story stops where it ought to have begun. Tara Thorne finds that Clara has "outsized ideas that dominate and weaken the film beneath it", lacking in humour but featuring too much "data talk", though it finally gains traction in the last twenty minutes, a "big reveal" that pays off but also sacrifices genuine emotions for "dutifully plotted emotional beats." Having said all this, Thorne calls Sherman an "assured director who clearly has big plans."

Unlike Thorne, Don Shanahan finds the real life science as an "interwoven backdrop" provides a "narrative boon for the science fiction of Clara." Its "sense of intelligence intertwines with the unpredictability found in the amorous reverberations of the human heart", a combination which makes for an "intimate and daring film experience", a "rare treat" to have "two narrative genres combined with smarts and affection." Writing for Exclaim!, Alex Hudson finds the science more intriguing than what he calls the film's philosophical musings, but, despite its flaws, it works as a mood piece: "the colours are muted, the score is appropriately ethereal, and it effectively captures Isaac's depression as he searches for meaning in his broken life. It gets under the skin even when it doesn't stimulate the mind." Assigning the film 3.5 stars, Victor Stiff complains of the "glaring imbalance between the male and female lead characters", though the actors themselves "play well off each other" and, despite those issues, the film "comes through with a rousing conclusion that speaks to a longing we all feel as humans."

Giving the film a B rating, Jim Slotek calls Clara a "solidly written" film with an impressive "level of sophistication in the storytelling", benefiting from NASA–provided photos and effects "cannily" used to give it "the look of a much higher budgeted movie". Daniel Hart assigns the film 4.5 stars, calling it a "remarkable" and "thought-provoking" story with applaudable performances".

=== Scientific response ===
Doug Welch responded to Sherman's original script because "it captures the excitement of revealing other planets and the potential for even identifying life elsewhere during our lifetime... it was clear to me that Akash understood a lot of the field and how it worked. You see this in small details, too, like ... using remote observations with a telescope in Chile." The film's trailer, due both to "lush" visual effects and such "teasing science-savvy plot points" attracted a lot of attention on social media from astronomers.

=== Accolades ===
==== Award ====
- Austin Film Festival, 2018 • Jury Award for a Narrative Feature (Akash Sherman and James Ewasiuk)

==== Nominations ====
2018

- Directors Guild of Canada Discovery Award; shortlisted (1 of 4)
- Vancouver Film Critics Circle One to Watch Award and Best Actress in a Canadian Film

2019

- Golden Trailer Awards Best Foreign Poster
