= Feed (2017 film) =

2017 film by Tommy Bertelsen

- Film poster
- Directed by: Tommy Bertelsen
- Written by: Troian Bellisario
- Produced by: Troian Bellisario; Tommy Bertelsen; Ross Kohn; Nancy Leopardi
- Starring: Troian Bellisario; Tom Felton; Ben Winchell; Paula Malcolmson; James Remar; David Warshofsky; Willie Garson
- Cinematography: Igor Kropotov
- Edited by: Jennifer Vecchiarello
- Music by: Michael Shuman
- Production company: Indy Entertainment
- Distributed by: Sony Pictures Home Entertainment
- Release date: July 18, 2017
- Running time: 95 minutes
- Country: United States
- Language: English

Feed is a 2017 American drama film directed by Tommy Bertelsen, written, produced and starring Troian Bellisario. The story revolves around a high school senior (Bellisario) who struggles with life after the tragic death of her twin brother (Tom Felton), causing her physical and mental health, as well as her grades and social relationships, to deteriorate rapidly. Still haunted by her brother's passing, she tries to maintain a facade of normalcy while continually battling with her inner demons. The film is loosely based on Bellisario's own experiences with an eating disorder that she was able to overcome.

== Plot ==
Twins Olivia and Matt are as close as they are different. Olivia strives for excellence, something that her father (James Remar) seems to expect of her more than her fraternity-destined brother. Yet, despite the fact that Matt seemingly has it "easy," he's also the one who looks out for Liv. And while their relationship isn't perfect (perhaps Matt is a little too protective), it is one that Liv can count on. But after arguing with Liv about her decision to get drunk and hook up with their mutual friend Julian (Ben Winchell) at a Halloween party, Matt crashes the car they are in, and dies.

Olivia, unable to carry the guilt she feels alone, begins to see Matt — or some hostile version of him — in moments she might need him most. Matt tells her what to do, what to say, what to think — and, specifically, when not to eat. (Liv visualizes that she's saving the food for Matt, who can only live on if Liv makes this sacrifice.)

After a suicide attempt at a party her parents hosted, Liv is sent to an Eating Disorder Inpatient Treatment Center. Even there, her brother torments her by forcing her to lie to the therapists or forcing her to save food for him (against the center's rules). During a therapy session, Olivia finally talks to her therapist how she's really been feeling which causes the ghost of Matt to go into a rage, screaming at her about how he hates her and never loved her. After talking to him, she lets go of this version of Matt and recognizes that the voice that is telling her to control her eating isn't that of her brother.

== Cast ==
- Troian Bellisario as Olivia "Liv" Grey, a wannabe valedictorian
- Tom Felton as Matthew "Matt" Grey, Olivia's twin who appears mostly as a ghost in her head
  - Jack McGraw as Young Matt
- Ben Winchell as Julian, Olivia's crush
- James Remar as Tom Grey, father of the twins
- Paula Malcomson as Samantha Grey, mother of the twins
- David Warshofsky as Dr. Rothstein
- Willie Garson as M. Brack
- Adam Shapiro as M. Donovan
- Tiffany Boone as Casey
- Victor Mascitelli as Petrovich
- Betsey Brown as Betsey
