= These Girls =

- Movie poster
- Directed by: John Hazlett
- Written by: John Hazlett
- Produced by: Anne-Marie Gélinas; Andrew Noble; John Hamilton; Sam Grana
- Starring: David Boreanaz; Caroline Dhavernas; Amanda Walsh; Holly Lewis
- Cinematography: Alex Vendler
- Edited by: Benjamin Duffield
- Music by: Ned Bouhalassa
- Distributed by: Seville Pictures
- Release date: September 10, 2005 (Toronto International Film Festival)
- Running time: 92 minutes
- Country: Canada
- Language: English

These Girls is a 2005 film directed by John Hazlett and starring David Boreanaz, Caroline Dhavernas, Holly Lewis, Amanda Walsh, Colin C. Berry and Donnell Makenzie. Based upon the play of the same name by Vivienne Laxdal, its plot concerns three girls (Dhavernas, Lewis, and Walsh) who attempt to seduce an older man (Boreanaz) in their town. After Glory (Walsh) is found sleeping with Keith, the other two girls attempt to do the same, ultimately looking to share him amongst the three.

The film was released on March 2, 2006, in Quebec, March 24, 2006, in English Canada, and released on DVD in North America May 16, 2006. It was featured in the Toronto International Film Festival.

The film was produced in association with CHUM Television, and Canadian premium television movie channels The Movie Network, Movie Central & Super Écran. Cast member Amanda Walsh was a former VJ for CHUM-owned MuchMusic.

As a Canadian production, it also received financial support from state programs like Telefilm Canada. The film was mainly filmed in Shediac, NB, with some scenes in Moncton, NB and Sackville, NB.

== Plot ==
The film takes place over a summer by the seaside and follows three girls through a summer that will change their lives. The story is told by Keira St. George (Caroline Dhavernas), a girl who is trying to decide what to do with her life. She constantly throws away her college letter without reading it, but her father always retrieves it, annoying her more. Her two best friends are Glory Lorraine (Amanda Walsh) a beautiful but somewhat bitchy girl obsessed with marriage, and Lisa MacDougall (Holly Lewis), an awkward, born-again, religious girl who is obsessed with sex.

Glory babysits for Keith Clark (David Boreanaz) and his wife, who works the night shift four times a week. Keith is a 32-year-old husband and father, who loves to ride his motorcycle, gamble with friends and smoke pot. One afternoon, Keira talks to Gordon Gruber (Donnell MacKenzie), who is a bit slow, trying to get information from him about Keith, who has taken Gruber under his wing. Gruber tells Keira about the pot growing in Keith's backyard. That night, Keira and Lisa decide to take some of Keith's pot. While leaving, they hear what sounds like Keith and his wife having sex. Sex crazed Lisa decides to take a closer look. When Kiera joins her, the two discover that Keith isn't with his wife but with Glory! Later that night, Glory arrives at the bonfire. Keira and Lisa tell Glory about seeing her with Keith. Glory defends her actions, saying she loves Keith and he loves her.

The next day, while Keira works at the food stand, Glory tells her more about Keith and her relationship with him. Wheels begin to turn in Keira's head, and after debating with herself, she decides to go to Keith's. He thinks she wants to buy pot, but she tells him she will "babysit" too. She convinces him to let her in. He tells her he's married and she's half his age, but it is obvious both are attracted to each other. She leads Keith into the bedroom.

The next day, Lisa arrives at the stand to tell Keira that she's going to sleep with Keith Clark. Keira tells Lisa that she's supposed to be religious and wait until she's married and that she will hurt Glory, but according to Lisa, since she hasn't been baptized yet, it's okay. She is concerned that when she marries, her virgin husband will not be satisfying. Not heeding Keira's repeated warnings, Lisa continues with her plan. When she arrives at Keith's house, he is in the garden. During their awkward conversation, in which Lisa makes it clear that she wants to "babysit" too, Glory arrives and is angry at Lisa and hostile to the others. While Keith tends to his crying daughter, Glory yells at Lisa for what she is doing. Eventually, Keith agrees to allow Lisa to babysit that night.

While babysitting, Lisa calls Keira to tell her she's at Keith's house. Keira begs her not to follow through with her plan, angering Lisa, who only wants Keira to come over and support. Keith arrives home and Lisa jumps him in an attempt to have sex, saying it's okay with Glory. Keith, obviously weirded out, eventually agrees to help Lisa lose her virginity. Keira and Glory arrive outside to watch through the bedroom window. While Keith and Lisa have awkward sex, outside, Keira admits to Glory that she also slept with Keith and Glory punches her, making her nose bleed. Glory is furious and storms into the house and into the bedroom. An argument ensues between the girls and eventually all three leave.

Glory later refuses to talk to her best friends. She goes to Keith's house to discuss matters, but Keith rebukes her. Heartbroken and professing again that she loves him, Glory joins her friends in Keira's bedroom where Keira tells them about her plan. Keira and Lisa decide that since all three girls want Keith, then they should share him. Keira explains that with Sue, Keith's wife, working four night shifts, each girl could have him for a night and they could all "hang out" on the fourth night. Keith initially balks at the proposal but Keira threatens him with the fact that if people somehow find out: he will be considered a "pervert pothead who molests young girls". Keith reluctantly agrees.

The nightly sessions take a toll on Keith, who cannot stay awake anymore. He has performance problems and is upset that he has not been intimate with his wife and has a responsibility to his family. Keith becomes upset when the girls nearly tip off his wife and is hostile to the girls, but Keira restates her threat. Later, the girls are frightened when Lenny (Paul Spence), a biker friend of Keith's, arrives and begins to beat up Keith. As later revealed, Keith and Lenny plotted the attack to scare the girls, but it backfires when the girls take the baby and run. Keith is startled when he finds Gruber in the basement. Gruber tells Keith he has seen what Keith has been doing and that he knows about Keith and Lenny's plan. Keith is not intimidated.

When he realizes his daughter is missing, Keith freaks out and takes off to find her. At the dock, he grabs Lisa hard, screaming at her to tell him where his daughter is. Gruber attacks him from behind, knocking him out with a tire iron. Donny (Colin C. Berry) arrives at the scene and all five teens take Jasmine and the unconscious and bleeding Keith back home and debate whether to call 911. Keira hangs up the phone when Keith awakes but a colleague at the hospital tells Sue that there was a hang up call to 911 from her house. Sue leaves to investigate. Meanwhile, at the house, Glory again professes her love to Keith but he rejects her, saying she is crazy to think he would leave with her. She tells him that she's pregnant, which shocks everyone.

The teens disperse. Donny drives Glory, Gruber and Lisa home. As Glory sits crying, Donny holds her and comforts her. Keith's wife returns home, shocked at the mess and her husband's injury. Keith lies to her, telling her it was Lenny how injured him. She calls the police, which leads Lenny to punch him out. Lisa leaves for her religious boarding school where she still seems to be freaky. Donny and a pregnant Glory begin to date. Keira ends up going to college and knows she's going to enjoy it...

=== Cast ===
- David Boreanaz as Keith Clark
- Caroline Dhavernas as Keira St-George
- Holly Lewis as Lisa MacDougall
- Amanda Walsh as Glory Lorraine
- Colin C. Berry as Donny Chesniak
- Donnell MacKenzie as Gordon Gruber
- Paul Spence as Lenny

== Production ==
According to the film credits, the film was shot on-location in 2005 mainly in the cottage country areas of Shediac and Cap Pele in New Brunswick, Canada.
