= Donald P. Bellisario =

American television producer and screenwriter (born 1935)

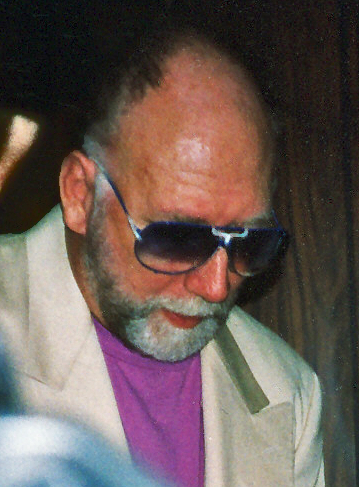
- Bellisario at Leap Con in 1993
- Born: Donald Paul Bellisario; August 8, 1935 (age 91); Cokeburg, Pennsylvania, U.S.
- Education: Pennsylvania State University
- Occupations: Television producer, screenwriter
- Years active: 1977–present
- Known for: Magnum, P.I.; Tales of the Gold Monkey; Airwolf; Quantum Leap; JAG; NCIS
- Spouses: Margaret Schaffran (m. 1956; div. 1974) Lynn Halpern (m. 1979; div. 1984) Deborah Pratt (m. 1984; div. 1991) Vivienne Lee Murray (m. 1998)
- Children: 7, including Michael and Troian
- Relatives: Sean Murray (stepson); Patrick J. Adams (son-in-law)
- Awards: Hollywood Walk of Fame
- Military career
- Allegiance: United States
- Branch: United States Marine Corps
- Service years: 1955–1959
- Rank: Sergeant

Donald Paul Bellisario (born August 8, 1935) is an American television producer and screenwriter who created and wrote episodes for the TV series Magnum, P.I. (1980–1988), Tales of the Gold Monkey (1982–1983), Airwolf (1984–1987), Quantum Leap (1989–1993), JAG (1995–2005), and NCIS (2003–present).

== Early life and education ==
Bellisario was born in Cokeburg, Pennsylvania, on August 8, 1935, to an Italian-American father, and a Serbian-American mother. He served in the U.S. Marine Corps from 1955 to 1959, and attained the rank of sergeant. According to Bellisario, he encountered—and nearly got into a fight with—Lee Harvey Oswald in 1958 at a supply shed at Marine Air Control Squadron 9 because Oswald was reading Pravda, which offended Bellisario.

Bellisario earned a bachelor's degree in journalism from Pennsylvania State University in 1961.

== Career ==
Bellisario became an advertising copywriter in Lancaster, Pennsylvania in 1965, and three years later became creative director of the Bloom Agency in Dallas, Texas. Upon rising to senior vice president after eight years, he then moved to Hollywood to pursue screenwriting and production.

After working under television producers Glen A. Larson and Stephen J. Cannell, Bellisario adopted some of their production techniques, for example, using a small pool of actors for his many productions. He created or co-created the TV series Magnum, P.I.; Airwolf; Quantum Leap; JAG; and NCIS. He was a writer and producer on Black Sheep Squadron and the original Battlestar Galactica. He wrote and directed the 1988 feature film Last Rites.

Many of Bellisario's protagonists are current or former members of the United States Navy or Marines. Tom Selleck's character in Magnum, P.I. was a United States Naval Academy graduate, former Naval Intelligence officer and Vietnam veteran; Jan-Michael Vincent's character in Airwolf was a Vietnam veteran; Commander Harmon "Harm" Rabb, Jr., the main character of JAG, was a Naval Academy graduate and former Naval Aviator; and NCIS's main character, Leroy Jethro Gibbs, is a retired Marine Corps Gunnery Sergeant and Scout Sniper; Jake Cutter (Stephen Collins) from Tales of the Gold Monkey was a former Flying Tigers pilot; and Albert "Al" Calavicci in Quantum Leap was a former Naval Aviator, Vietnam prisoner of war and rear admiral. Several of his main characters share August 8 as their birthday.

Bellisario received a star on the Hollywood Walk of Fame in 2004, which was shown in a Season 9 JAG episode, "Trojan Horse". In an interview with Sci-Fi Channel in the late 1990s, Bellisario said he was inspired to create Quantum Leap in 1988 after reading a novel about time travel. His service alongside John F. Kennedy's assassin, Lee Harvey Oswald, was the basis for the Quantum Leap fifth season double-length episode "Lee Harvey Oswald" (originally aired September 22, 1992).

Bellisario retired in 2007, after widely reported tension with star Mark Harmon ended with the former's departure from NCIS. Although he retains the title of executive producer, he has not had any real creative or executive involvement with NCIS since then. Bellisario later sued CBS over the creation of NCIS: Los Angeles, arguing his contract with the network entitled him to the first rights to create any NCIS spin off, as well as some share of profits from the new show. The suit was settled before trial in 2011 for an undisclosed amount.

Bellisario's production company was named "Belisarius Productions" after the Roman general Flavius Belisarius, as "Bellisario" is an Italian-variant of the Latin language "Belisarius".

== Personal life ==
Bellisario married Margaret Schaffran in 1956 and they divorced in 1974. They had four children, Joy Bellisario-Jenkins (born c. 1956-2025), David Bellisario (1957–2020) a producer on NCIS: Los Angeles, Leslie Bellisario-Ingham (born c. 1961), and Julie Bellisario-Watson (producer on NCIS).

Bellisario married Lynn Halpern in 1979 and they divorced in 1984. They had a son, Michael Bellisario, born on April 7, 1980. Michael had a recurring role as Midshipman Michael Roberts on JAG and played Charles "Chip" Sterling on NCIS.

He married Deborah Pratt, known for her character in Bellisario's Airwolf, in 1984 and they divorced in 1991. They had two children, Troian (born October 28, 1985) and Nicholas (born August 27, 1991). Troian portrayed Sarah McGee on NCIS, Teresa Bruckner in the Quantum Leap episode "Another Mother", and Erin on JAG, but has become best known for her 2010–2017 role as Spencer Hastings on Pretty Little Liars, a series her father did not produce.

Bellisario married Vivienne Murray (née Lee), on November 27, 1998. He gained two stepsons from the marriage, Chad and Sean Murray, the latter an actor who plays Timothy McGee on NCIS.

== Philanthropy and awards ==
In 2001, Penn State named Bellisario a Distinguished Alumnus, the highest honor bestowed on a graduate.

In 2006, Bellisario endowed a $1 million Trustee Matching Scholarship in the Penn State College of Communications. He recalled:

Growing up in a hardscrabble western Pennsylvania coal mining town, I know first hand the sacrifices that are made to give a son or daughter a university education ... and as a Marine veteran who returned to Penn State with two small children and little money, I remember all too well that struggle. It's my hope that this scholarship will also ease the financial burden of other young men and women who have defended our country to attain their academic goals.

On October 27, 2016, he received a Visionary Award at the UCLA Neurosurgery Visionary Ball.

On April 21, 2017, the Pennsylvania State University Board of Trustees voted to rename the College of Communications the Donald P. Bellisario College of Communications in recognition of a $30 million endowment from Bellisario. The donation is one of the largest gifts in Penn State history.

== Filmography ==
Years	Title	Creator	Director	Writer	Producer	Notes
1977	Big Hawaii	No	No	Yes	No	
1977	Kojak	No	No	Yes	No	
1977–1978	Baa Baa Black Sheep	No	Yes	Yes	Yes	
1978	Switch	No	No	Yes	No	
1978–1979	Battlestar Galactica	No	Yes	Yes	Yes	
1979	Quincy, M.E.	No	No	No	Yes	
1980	Stone	No	No	Yes	No	
1980–1988	Magnum, P.I.	Yes	Yes	Yes	Yes	
1982–1983	Tales of the Gold Monkey	Yes	No	Yes	Yes	
1984–1987	Airwolf	Yes	Yes	Yes	Yes	
1987	Three on a Match	—N/a	Yes	Yes	No	Television film
1988	Last Rites	—N/a	Yes	Yes	Yes	Directorial Debut (only theatrical feature film credit)
1989–1993	Quantum Leap	Yes	Yes	Yes	Yes	
1992	Tequila and Bonetti	Yes	No	Yes	Yes	
1995	Crowfoot	—N/a	Yes	Yes	Yes	Television film
1995–2005	JAG	Yes	Yes	Yes	Yes	
2002	First Monday	Yes	Yes	Yes	Yes	
2003–present	NCIS	Yes	Yes	Yes	Yes	
2022–2024	Quantum Leap	Yes	No	No	Yes	
