= Last Rites (1988 film) =

1988 film by Donald P. Bellisario

- Theatrical release poster
- Directed by: Donald P. Bellisario
- Written by: Donald P. Bellisario
- Produced by: Donald P. Bellisario; Patrick McCormick
- Starring: Tom Berenger; Daphne Zuniga; Chick Vennera
- Cinematography: David Watkin
- Edited by: Pembroke J. Herring
- Music by: Bruce Broughton
- Production company: Metro-Goldwyn-Mayer
- Distributed by: Metro-Goldwyn-Mayer/UA Communications Co.
- Release date: November 18, 1988
- Running time: 103 minutes
- Countries: United States; Mexico
- Language: English
- Box office: $426,695

Last Rites is a 1988 thriller film starring Tom Berenger, Daphne Zuniga, and Chick Vennera. The film was written and directed by television producer and writer Donald P. Bellisario, best known for his work on the television series Magnum, P.I. and Quantum Leap. It was Bellisario's first and only theatrical film directing effort.

== Plot ==
Father Michael is a New York priest with close ties to the Mafia crime syndicate—his father is a don. The priest's brother-in-law Gino, a mafia boss, is murdered while having sex with Angela, a mistress. She narrowly escapes by hiding in a bathroom and locking the door.

Pursued by hitmen, the mistress comes to the priest for confession. She is afraid to go to the police so Father Mike agrees to meet her at her choice of location. A cab driver transports him to a loft apartment, telling him a sorrowful tale of how Angela has helped him and his wife with the grief over losing a young son. Father Mike confronts her about knowing his relationship to Gino. She denies knowing the connection. When the two encounter the hitmen, the priest is wounded and one of the hitmen recognizes Father Mike.

Angela hides in his church. She tells him it was Gino's wife who shot him. Gino is buried, and Father Mike glares across the casket at his sister Zena, having seen her with the hitmen when he was shot. He speaks to his father, who says he expects to lose at his racketeering trial and be sent to prison. The Don tells the priest that his sister wants to run the business, but he has said no since she's a woman. As they leave the cemetery, the hitman tells the Don and Zena that he recognized Michael.

Zena comes to confession and tells Father Mike that she knows of him helping the girl. The priest begins to fall in love with Angela. He meets best friend Nuzo, a detective and godson of his father. Nuzo tells him not to trust her. He tells Mike that Gino gave evidence to a rival crime syndicate, which sealed the Don's fate, in return for 5 million dollars. Nuzo tells him to sit tight while he makes an arrest, but Nuzo is gunned down, dying in Mike's arms.

Father Mike and Angela flee to Mexico, heading for her village. For the first time the priest violates his vows and they have sex. In the morning she is gone. Meanwhile, the Don finds out they are in Mexico and sends Zena to kill the girl. Father Mike races to catch up to Angela, thwarting another hitman along the way. He arrives in the village in time for a religious festival. Seeing no sign of Angela, Michael goes into the Cathedral. He prays sincerely and contemplates. There is an emphasis on the Virgin Mary, as there is throughout this film.

Angela is a fraud who set Gino up and took the money. She is also married to the "cabbie" she sent to pick him up. Now she instructs her husband to kill him. He stops at the festival and Michael spots him. He witnesses the cabbie drive away in the rental car Angela took. Seeing the statue of “The Virgin”, but his heart more or less committed to “sin”, Michael discards his priestly ring.

Michael then goes to the hotel and finds a surprised Angela. He lies that he loves her and they have sex again. She awakens to see Michael sitting in a chair, staring at her. He stands, walks to the door and leaves her, saying "Vaya con Dios," which is Spanish for "Go with God."

Angela is stunned to see Zena step through the door. Zena fatally shoots Angela as Michael continues down the steps past the body of the "cabbie." He gets into a limo and waits for Zena. She sits next to him and says, "Thank you, brother." He takes her hand and kisses it as they drive away.

The film ends, in the Cathedral, with a slow zoom onto “The Virgin”. As the shot reached its closest point, and as the film begins its ending fade to black, a barely perceptible tear is shown dripping from the statue's eye.

== Cast ==
- Tom Berenger as Father Michael Pace
- Daphne Zuniga as Angela
- Chick Vennera as Nuzo
- Anne Twomey as Zena
- Dane Clark as Don Carlo
- Paul Dooley as Father Freddie
- Vassili Lambrinos as Tío
- Adrian Paul as Tony
- Deborah Pratt as Robin Dwyer
- Tony DiBenedetto as Lieutenant Jericho
- Al Rodrigo as Luis de Vega

== Reception ==
The film was both a commercial and critical failure and caused a significant amount of controversy because of the touchy subject matter. Roger Ebert (himself raised Catholic) gave the film a "zero star" rating, writing,

This is it -- located at last and with only six weeks to spare -- the worst film of 1988. "Last Rites" qualifies because it passes both acid tests: It is not only bad filmmaking, but it is offensive as well -- offensive to my intelligence.

In The United States, the film grossed $427,000, making it one of the biggest box office bombs of 1988.
