= Rittershoffen =

Rittershoffen Ritterschoffe
- Commune
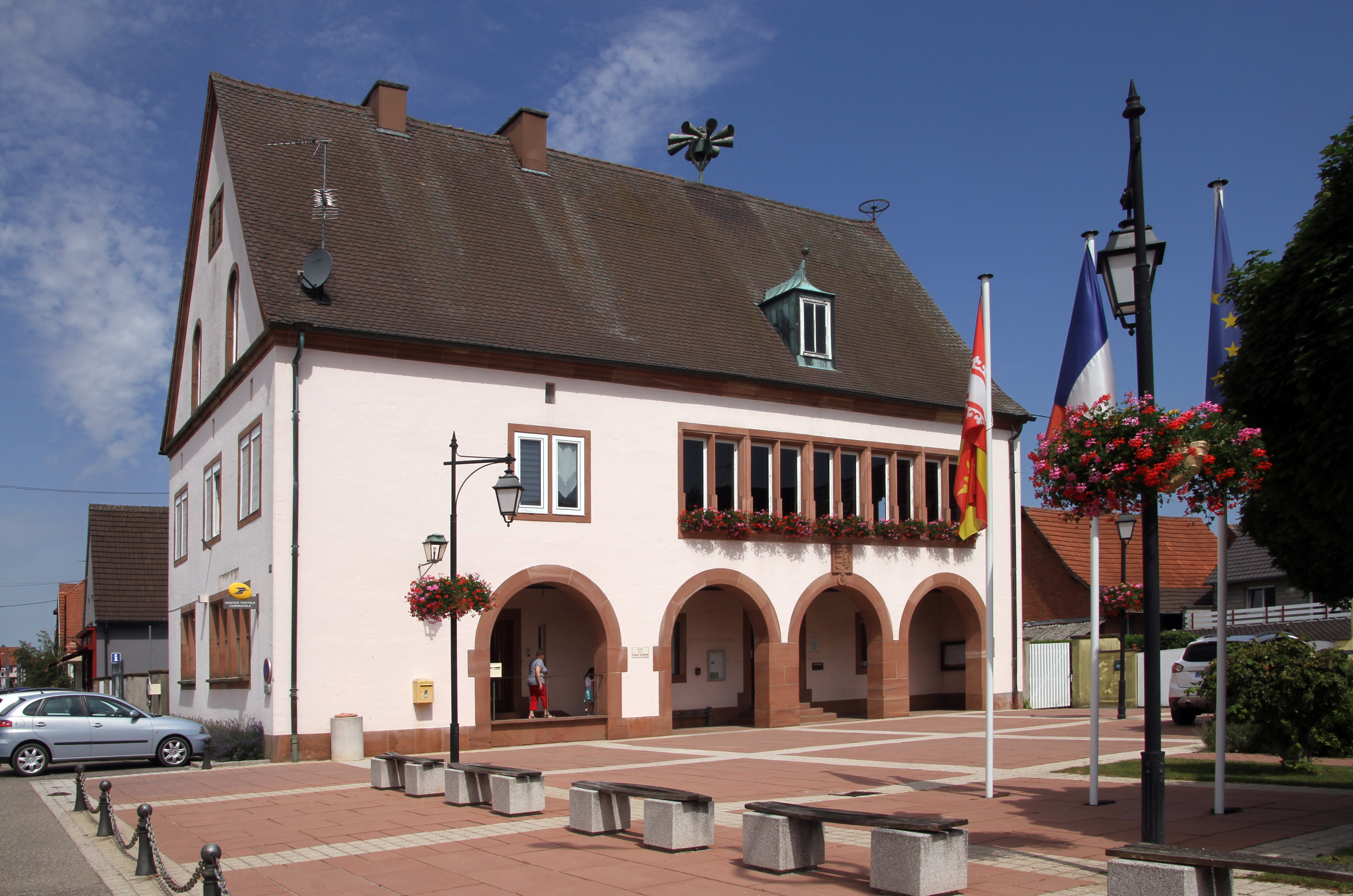
- The town hall in Rittershoffen

- Coat of arms
- Location of Rittershoffen
- Location within France Location within Grand Est
- Coordinates: 48°54′15″N 7°57′08″E
- Country: France
- Region: Grand Est
- Department: Bas-Rhin
- Arrondissement: Haguenau-Wissembourg
- Canton: Wissembourg

Government
  - Mayor (2020–2026): Jean-Bernard Weigel
- Area^{1}: 12.13 km^{2} (4.68 sq mi)
- Highest elevation: 179 m (587 ft)
- Lowest elevation: 120 m (390 ft)
- Population (2023): 928
  - Density: 76.5/km^{2} (198/sq mi)
- Time zone: UTC+01:00 (CET)
  - Summer (DST): UTC+02:00 (CEST)
- INSEE/Postal code: 67404 /67690
- ^{1} French Land Register data, which excludes lakes, ponds, glaciers > 1 km^{2} (0.386 sq mi or 247 acres) and river estuaries.

Rittershoffen is a commune in the Bas-Rhin department in Grand Est in north-eastern France. The commune was the scene of fierce fighting during Operation Nordwind in January 1945.

== See also ==
- Communes of the Bas-Rhin department
