= Keith Bearden =

American screenwriter and director

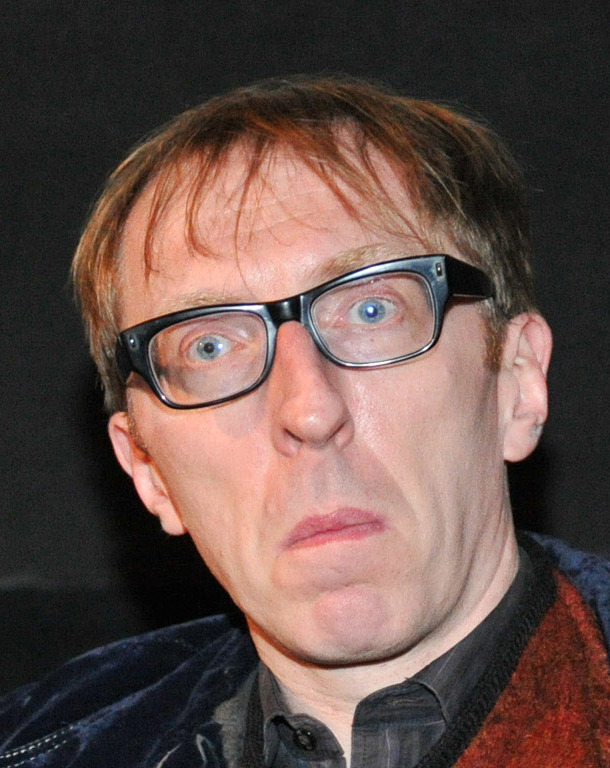
- Bearden in 2011
- Occupations: screenwriter and director

Keith Bearden (born in Middletown, Connecticut) is an American screenwriter and director.

Starting at age 9, he began acting extensively on stage, performing in productions at Wesleyan University and Yale University, and 10 years acting and then teaching at The Oddfellows Playhouse.

While attending the Evergreen State College in Olympia, Washington, he made a series of comic/surreal short films in Super 8 and 16mm film.

He currently resides in New York.

== Career ==
=== Journalism ===
Bearden wrote extensively on film and filmmakers for magazines such as Movie Maker, Fangoria, The Seattle Weekly, Time Out NY, Slant, Psychotronic Video and The Stranger. During this time he interviewed actors and directors including Russ Meyer, John Sayles, Jackie Chan, Charles Durning, Paul Schrader, John G. Avildsen, Udo Kier, Werner Herzog, Kevin Smith, Paul Morrissey and Dario Argento.

=== Films ===
Co-written with Joel Haskard and made with Brooklyn producers Brad Buckwalter and Sharon Eagan, The Raftman’s Razor was a 7 minute 16mm short “existentialist fable” concerning two small town boys obsessed with a comic book superhero that essentially does nothing. It had its US premiere at the 2005 Sundance Film Festival and went on to win awards at Montreal Film Festival, Clermont-Ferrand, SxSW, Seattle International Film Festival and RES Fest. It was added to the permanent film collection of the Museum of Modern Art in 2009.

Written and filmed as Miss January, but with a title change due to resistance from Playboy Enterprises, Meet Monica Velour premiered at the Tribeca Film Festival and given a four city theatrical release in April 2011 by Anchor Bay Entertainment. Starring Dustin Ingram, Kim Cattrall and Brian Dennehy, the film was signaled out by many critics as giving Cattrall the best film performance of her nearly 30 year career. It was released on DVD and Blu-ray by Sony Entertainment worldwide. Despite some very positive reviews, Bearden noted that he did not have final music, edit, or script control in the DVD Director’s Commentary, calling it “almost my movie.”

His 2nd feature film "Antarctica" starring Chloe Levine and Kimie Muroya was called "a surrealistic fable about growing up in America," premiered at the Raindance Film Festival in November 2020 and was released on Amazon Prime and Apple TV weeks after.

== Awards ==
He is the recipient of Showtime’s Tony Cox Award for Screenwriting, a NYFA Fellow in Screenwriting, a two-time winner of the Jerome Foundation Film and Video Grant, and received a Guggenheim Fellowship in Filmmaking in 2008.
