= Charlie Plummer =

American actor (born 1999)

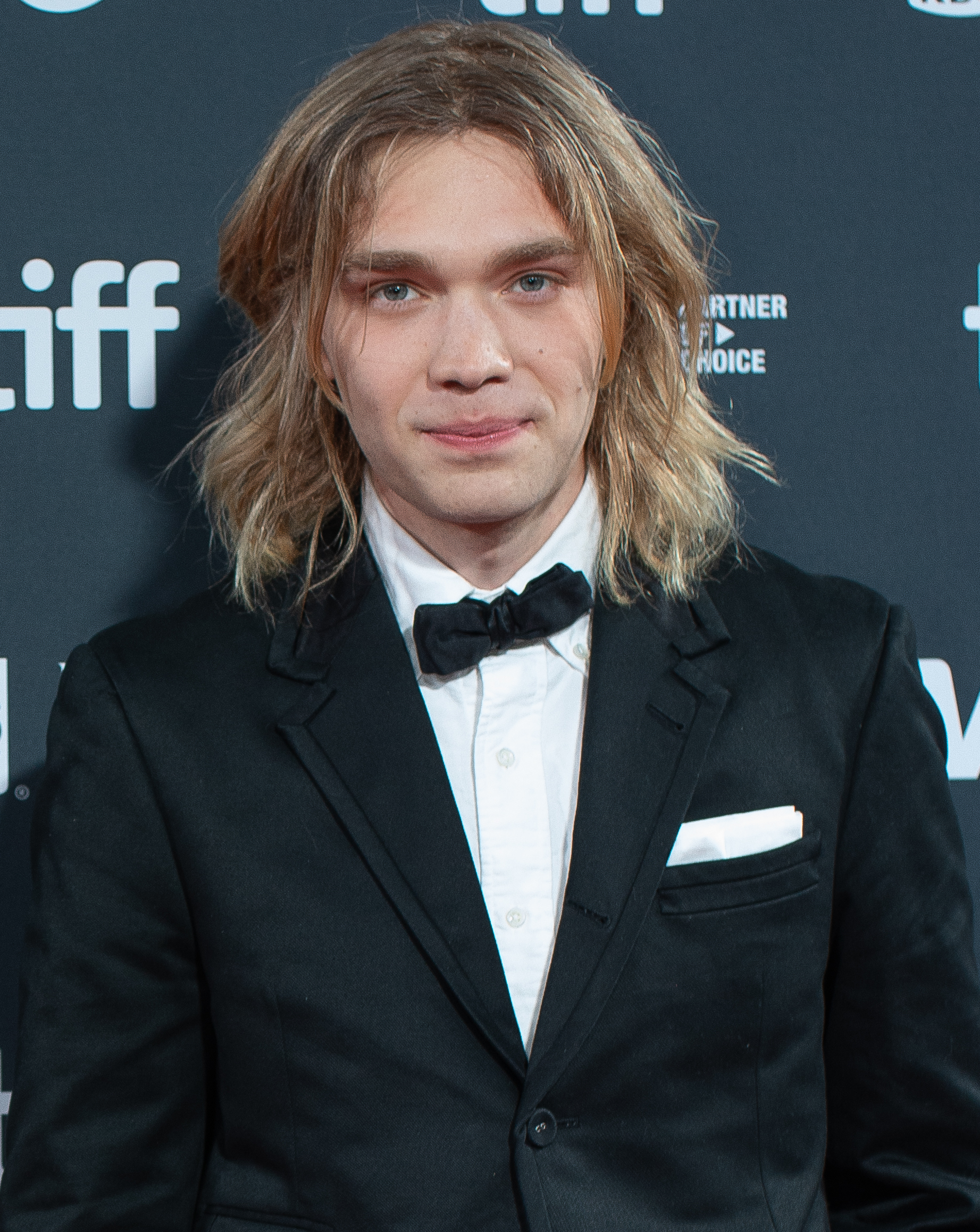
- Plummer in 2024
- Born: Charlie Faulkner Plummer; May 24, 1999 (age 27); Poughkeepsie, New York, U.S.
- Occupation: Actor
- Years active: 2010–present

Charlie Faulkner Plummer (born May 24, 1999) (Note: Numerous Instagram posts by his younger brother indicated his birthday as May 24, while several news sources stated his age at the time of their writing, placing his year of birth at 1999.) is an American actor. He began his career as a child actor in short films and made his feature film debut in David Chase's drama Not Fade Away (2012) before landing a lead role in King Jack (2015). In 2017, he gained wider recognition for playing John Paul Getty III in Ridley Scott's thriller All the Money in the World and troubled teenager Charley Thompson in Andrew Haigh's drama Lean on Pete. His performance in the latter earned him the Marcello Mastroianni Award for best emerging actor.

On television, Plummer made his first prominent appearances on the dramas Boardwalk Empire (2011–2013) and Granite Flats (2013–2015). He has since starred in the Hulu miniseries Looking for Alaska (2019) and portrayed a young Franklin D. Roosevelt in the Showtime series The First Lady (2022).

== Early life ==
Plummer was born in Poughkeepsie, New York, to theatre actress Maia Guest and writer-producer John Christian Plummer, and grew up in Cold Spring. He has a younger brother, James. His family moved frequently due to his parents' jobs which resulted in his attending seven different schools growing up: three in Los Angeles, two in upstate New York and two in New York City.

Despite being very shy as a child, Plummer was exposed to acting at an early age by his parents, both of whom had worked in theatre. He gained experience acting in local stage productions of plays and musicals, crediting the experience with the latter for sparking his love of acting. He met his current manager at the age of ten when he first sought professional acting roles. Plummer eventually transferred to and attended the Professional Children's School in Manhattan due to his demanding filming schedule on television shows.

== Career ==
As a child, Plummer acted in short films such as Frank (2010), Three Things (2011), and Alan Smithee (2012). In 2011, Plummer starred in eight episodes of HBO's television period drama Boardwalk Empire. He portrayed Eli Thompson's son Michael in seasons 2, 3 and 4. In 2012, Plummer made his feature film debut by playing a supporting role in David Chase's drama Not Fade Away. The film was released on December 21, 2012, by Paramount Vantage and received positive reviews. In 2013, Plummer joined the BYUtv's drama series Granite Flats, in which he played the lead role of Timmy Sanders. He starred in all 24 episodes of three seasons, which premiered on Netflix and ended in 2015. In 2015, he played the lead role of Jack in Felix Thompson's directorial debut King Jack. The film premiered at the Tribeca Film Festival.

In 2017, Plummer co-starred in Oren Moverman's drama thriller film The Dinner. The film was released on May 5, 2017, and received mixed reviews. He played the kidnapped heir John Paul Getty III in Ridley Scott's crime thriller All the Money in the World. The film was released on December 25, 2017, and received positive reviews. The same year, Plummer portrayed the troubled teenager Charley who finds solace and purpose in his friendship with the titular racehorse in Andrew Haigh's drama Lean on Pete. The actor felt a deep desire to play the role after connecting strongly with the story, which spurred him to send a letter to Haigh, expressing his passion for the project. The film premiered at the Venice International Film Festival where his performance received critical acclaim; he was also awarded the Marcello Mastroianni Award for best emerging actor. Richard Lawson of Vanity Fair stated Plummer had "one of the most striking breakthrough performances of the year".

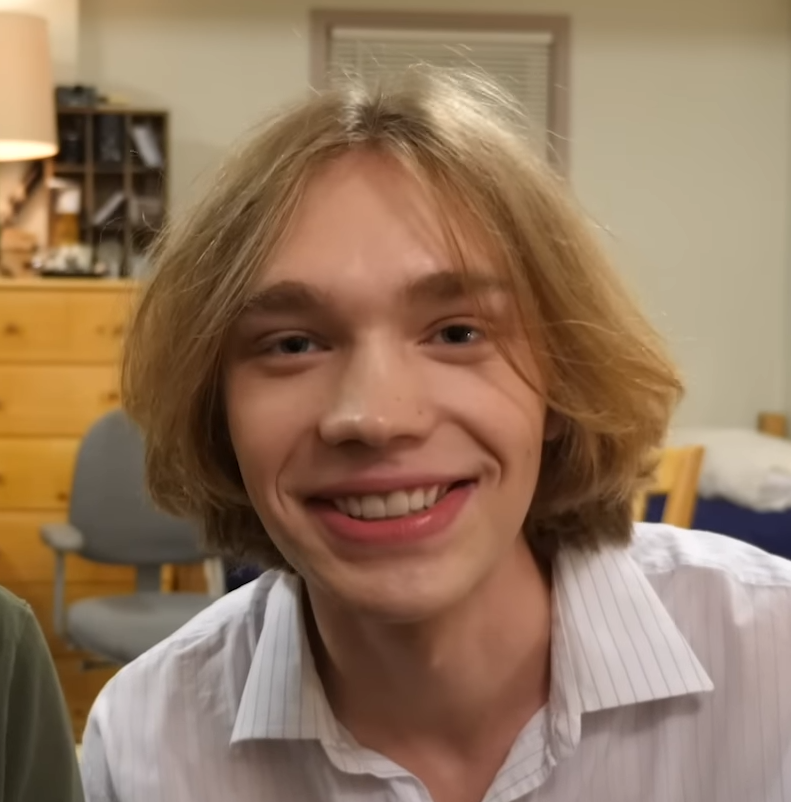
Plummer in 2019

In 2018, Plummer starred in Joshua Leonard's drama Dark Was the Night. He also appeared in Duncan Skiles's suspense thriller The Clovehitch Killer. In 2019, Plummer starred in Nabil Elderkin's feature film debut Gully. He also featured in Pippa Bianco's Share, produced by A24. In the same year, Plummer also had a leading role in Hulu's serial adaptation of John Green's novel Looking for Alaska, starring as 16-year-old Miles "Pudge" Halter. The series and Plummer's performance garnered critical acclaim.

In 2020, Plummer starred in Thor Freudenthal's drama Words on Bathroom Walls, playing a young man diagnosed with schizophrenia, and headlined the dark comedy Spontaneous, directed by Brian Duffield and based on the novel of the same name by Aaron Starmer. Both films received positive reviews. In 2022, Plummer starred in the coming of age drama Wildflower. The film received mixed reviews from critics. In 2023, he starred in National Anthem as Dylan, directed by Luke Gilford, which premiered at the 2023 SXSW Festival. The film was met with positive critical reviews, and his performance received critical acclaim.

== Personal life ==
Plummer lives in New York City and is a vegetarian. Prior to pursuing a full-time acting career, Plummer had considered dropping acting to work towards becoming a general manager for a football team due to his passion for the sport.

== Filmography ==
=== Film ===
Key
†	Denotes films that have not yet been released

Year	Title	Role	Notes	Ref.
2011	We Are the Hartmans	Young Jordan		
2012	Not Fade Away	Grace's little brother		
2015	King Jack	Jack		
2017	All the Money in the World	John Paul Getty III		
2017	The Dinner	Michael Lohman		
2017	Lean on Pete	Charley Thompson		
2018	The Clovehitch Killer	Tyler		
2018	Dark Was the Night	Marcus Lang		
2019	Gully	Nicky		
2019	Share	Dylan		
2020	Words on Bathroom Walls	Adam Petrazelli		
2020	Spontaneous	Dylan Hovemeyer		
2022	Moonfall	Sonny Harper		
2022	A Perfect Day for Caribou	Nate		
2022	Wildflower	Ethan		
2023	National Anthem	Dylan		
2024	The Return	Telemachus		
2025	The Long Walk	Gary Barkovitch		
TBA	My New Friend Jim †		Post-production	
TBA	Sunny †		Post-production	
TBA	Ibelin †	Mats Steen	Filming	

=== Television ===
Year	Title	Role	Notes	Ref.
2011	Onion SportsDome	Bully	1 episode	
2011–2013	Boardwalk Empire	Michael Thompson	Recurring role	
2012	Person of Interest	Kid	Season 1, episode 21	
2013	Wendell & Vinnie	Jann	1 episode	
2013–2015	Granite Flats	Timmy Sanders	Main role	
2019	Looking for Alaska	Miles "Pudge" Halter	Main role; miniseries	
2022	The First Lady	Franklin D. Roosevelt (young)	2 episodes	

=== Music videos ===
Year	Title	Artist	Album	Ref.
2020	"Is There Something in the Movies?"	Samia	The Baby	

== Awards and nominations ==
Year	Award	Category	Nominated work	Result	Ref.
2017	Les Arcs Film Festival	Best Actor	Lean on Pete	Won	
2017	Venice Film Festival	Marcello Mastroianni Award	Lean on Pete	Won	
2018	British Independent Film Awards	Best Actor	Lean on Pete	Nominated	
2018	Dublin Film Critics Circle	Best Actor	Lean on Pete	Won	
2018	Greater WNY Film Critics Association Awards	Best Actor	Lean on Pete	Nominated	
2018	Indiana Film Journalists Association	Best Actor	Lean on Pete	Nominated	
2018	International Online Cinema Awards	Best Actor	Lean on Pete	Nominated	
2018	San Diego Film Critics Society Awards	Best Breakthrough Artist	Lean on Pete	Runner-up	
2019	Chlotrudis Awards	Best Actor	Lean on Pete	Nominated	
