= Dark Was the Night =

Dark Was the Night may refer to:

- Dark Was the Night (album), a 2009 compilation album
- Dark Was the Night (2014 film), an American thriller film
- Dark Was the Night (2018 film), an American drama film
- "Dark Was the Night" (Grey's Anatomy), a 2011 episode of Grey's Anatomy

== See also ==
- "Dark Was the Night, Cold Was the Ground", a 1927 song by Blind Willie Johnson
