= Caitlin Bassett =

Caitlin Bassett may refer to:

- Caitlin Bassett (netball)
- Caitlin Bassett (actress)
- Caitlin Bassett (writer)
