= National Anthem (2023 film) =

2023 film directed by Luke Gilford

- Theatrical release poster
- Directed by: Luke Gilford
- Written by: David Largman Murray; Kevin Best; Luke Gilford
- Produced by: Mickey Liddell; Pete Shilaimon; Kevin Garland; Gina Marcheschi; Jasmine Daghighian
- Starring: Charlie Plummer; Eve Lindley; Mason Alexander Park; Rene Rosado; Robyn Lively
- Cinematography: Katelin Arizmendi
- Edited by: Amber Bansak; Josh Schaeffer
- Music by: Nick Urata; Perfume Genius
- Production company: LD Entertainment
- Distributed by: Variance Films
- Release dates: March 10, 2023 (SXSW); September 7, 2023 (TIFF); July 12, 2024 (U.S.)
- Running time: 99 minutes
- Country: United States
- Language: English
- Box office: $268,183

National Anthem is a 2023 American drama film directed by Luke Gilford, in his debut feature-length picture. Gilford co-wrote the screenplay with David Largman Murray and Kevin Best. The film stars Charlie Plummer, Eve Lindley, Mason Alexander Park, Rene Rosado, and Robyn Lively.

National Anthem premiered at the 2023 South by Southwest Film & TV Festival on March 10, 2023. It was released on July 12, 2024, by Variance Films. The film received positive reviews, with critics praising the direction, screenplay, cinematography, and performances of its cast (particularly Plummer and Lindley). Soundtrack by Nick Urata & Perfume Genius.

== Plot ==
Dylan is a 21-year-old who lives in rural New Mexico and works as a construction worker to help support his little brother Cassidy and alcoholic mother Fiona. He puts money away to save for an RV and see the country. One day he is recruited by Pepe to come work temporarily at a ranch called "House of Splendor" to do farmwork, where he sees its queer residents living peaceful lives from afar and gets acquainted with Pepe's trans girlfriend Sky, whom he feels an attraction to. Fiona warns Dylan not to get too close to the ranch residents after spotting a rainbow flag in the property.

Dylan finds a group of the residents at a superstore, where Sky applies eyeshadow on Dylan and invites him to a rodeo where a number of them will be participating. Dylan agrees to come but later flees the store ashamed of wearing makeup. Upon returning home, Cassidy helps Dylan remove the makeup, who asks to keep it a secret from Fiona.

At the rodeo, Dylan is overcome with happiness upon seeing everyone enjoy themselves. He is motivated to ride a bull by one of Sky's friends; later, Sky gifts him a belt buckle she won riding her horse, Cash, in the barrel race. The group later visits a drag bar where Sky performs a lip-sync number. After drinking mushroom tea, Dylan has a threesome with Sky and Pepe. Sky later reveals the pair is in an open relationship, although feelings of jealousy are evident in Pepe, who reminds Dylan of the fact that he is only a temporary resident at the ranch.

Dylan befriends Carrie, a non-binary resident who confides in him the story of how they were kicked out of their house by their conservative family after coming out. They advise Dylan that he can choose to be whoever he wants. After visiting a festival, Dylan and Sky have sex. The group visits the drag bar again where Dylan confidently performs a lip-sync number in drag. Fiona starts to resent Dylan for spending too much time at the ranch, taking Cassidy with him and buying him dresses. Dylan later discovers Fiona has stolen some of his RV money and storms off with Cassidy to live on the ranch.

While horse riding, Dylan and Sky are caught in a storm. Sky's horse, Cash, flees panicked into the storm, eventually succumbing to injuries after running into a barbed wire fence. This upsets Sky deeply and Pepe comforts her. Carrie attempts to assure a distraught Dylan that it wasn't his fault, although he blames himself for choosing to stay outdoors with Cash after Sky had warned him of the storm. Feeling guilty, Dylan and Cassidy return with Fiona, who embraces them.

An apologetic Fiona gives Dylan money to buy his RV and the two make amends, feeling hopeful for the future. Dylan takes his family to another rodeo. There, Dylan and Sky embrace amiably before parting ways.

== Cast ==
- Charlie Plummer as Dylan
- Eve Lindley as Sky
- Mason Alexander Park as Carrie
- Rene Rosado as Pepe
- Robyn Lively as Fiona
- Joey DeLeon as Cassidy

== Production ==
National Anthem was directed by Luke Gilford, marking his feature film debut. The screenplay was co-written by Gilford, David Largman Murray, and Kevin Best and was inspired by Gilford's monograph titled National Anthem: America's Queer Rodeo.

== Release ==
National Anthem premiered at the 2023 South by Southwest Film & TV Festival on March 10, 2023. The film had its international premiere at the 2023 Toronto International Film Festival on September 7, 2023. In February 2024, it was announced that Variance Films would distribute the film, with a July 12, 2024, release. The film had its first European premiere in London at the 32nd Raindance Film Festival in June 2024.

== Reception ==
=== Critical response ===
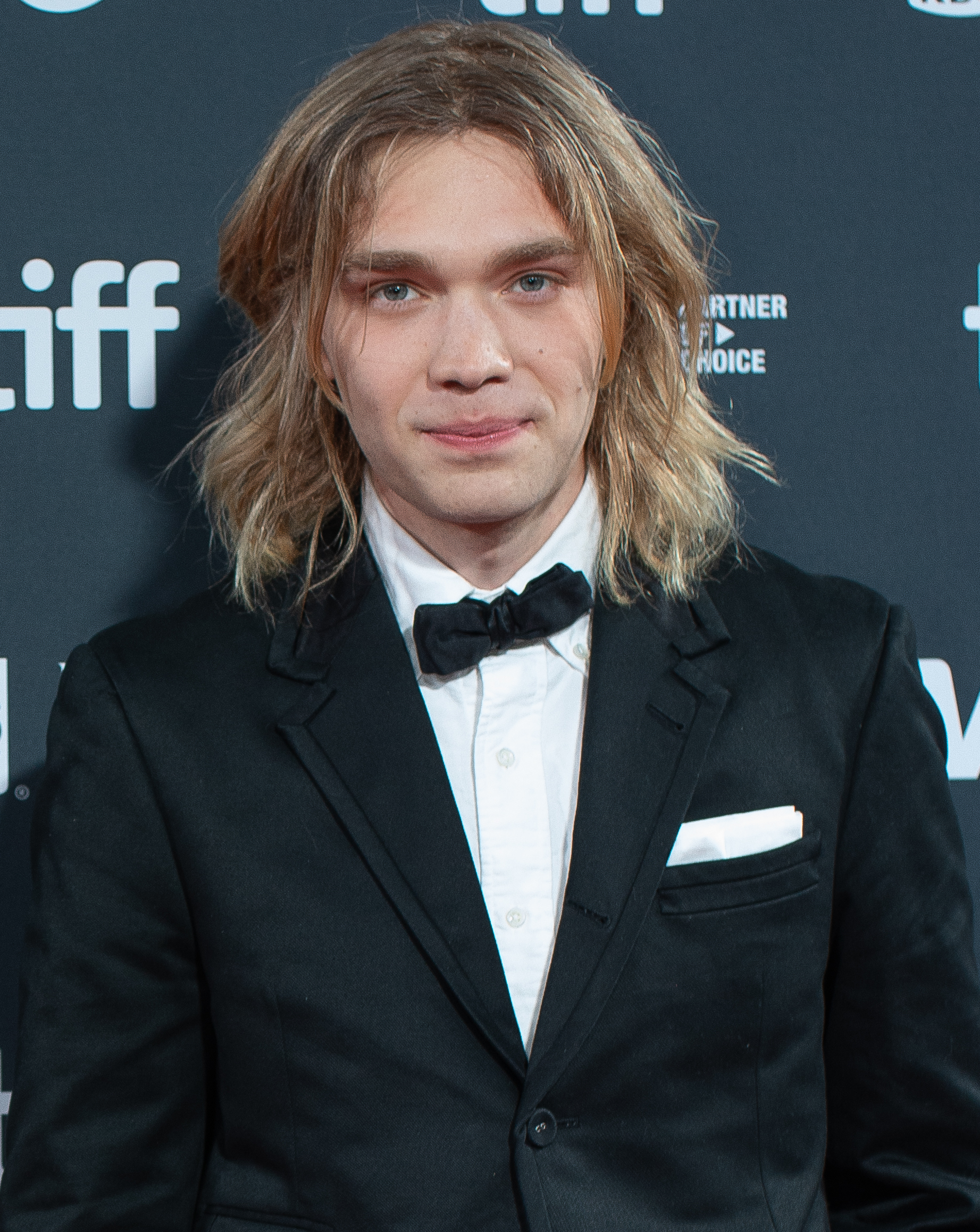
Charlie Plummer received critical acclaim for his performance as Dylan.

On the review aggregator website Rotten Tomatoes, 91% of 69 critics' reviews are positive. The website's consensus reads: "A soulful exploration of sexual fluidity with a vivid Americana backdrop, National Anthem earns a salute." Metacritic, which uses a weighted average, assigned the film a score of 71 out of 100, based on 18 critics, indicating "generally favorable" reviews.

Reviewing the film for RogerEbert.com, following its SXSW premiere, Brian Tallerico described the film as "both progressive and old-fashioned at the same time" and wrote, "Gilford has a strong eye—he captures the wide-open spaces of this beautiful country with a blend of awe and grace—but it's his work with performers and characters that announces a major talent." He also highlighted the performances of Plummer, Lindley, and Park as the standouts. Deadline Hollywood's Damon Wise said that the film presents "a sweetness and simplicity to its philosophy of see-and-be-seen that will likely make this an easy festival crowd-pleaser." Matthew Jacobs, writing for Vulture, compared the film to The Rider, The Power of the Dog, and The Sisters Brothers, particularly in "dissecting the masculinity [which is] often deemed inherent to the Western genre's landscapes," and praised the directing, cinematography, soundtrack, and Plummer's performance. He also called the film "a stunning start to [Gilford's] film career."

Writing for Paste, Aurora Amidon gave the film a score of 8.5 out of 10, writing that "the beauty of National Anthem is that it effortlessly challenges all expectations and preconceived notions" and lauding the directing, screenplay, and performances of Plummer and Lindley. Erin Brady of /Film gave it a score of 8 out of 10 and named it "a moving and well-crafted debut." She also praised the cinematography, screenplay, and performances of Plummer and Lindley and called Gilford "a powerful voice in modern queer art." Letterboxd included the film in its "Best of SXSW 2023" list and wrote, "This is an all-around beautiful film, expanding on Gilford's collection of photographs of the same name. For that book, Gilford spent three years documenting the queer rodeo subculture. Those beautiful people also appear here alongside stars Charlie Plummer and Eve Lindley, in dreamy sequences that highlight the beauty of living as your full, authentic self."

=== Accolades ===
Award	Date of ceremony	Category	Nominee(s)	Result	Ref.
Frameline Film Festival	June 19–29, 2024	Outstanding First Feature	Luke Gilford	Won	
Raindance Film Festival	June 19–28, 2024	Best Debut Director	Luke Gilford	Won	
Independent Spirit Awards	February 22, 2025	Best Breakthrough Performance	Mason Alexander Park	Nominated	
