= Quantum Leap (2022 TV series) =

American science fiction television series (2022–2024)

- Genre: Adventure drama; Science fiction
- Created by: Donald P. Bellisario
- Based on: Quantum Leap by Donald P. Bellisario
- Developed by: Steven Lilien; Bryan Wynbrandt
- Starring: Raymond Lee; Caitlin Bassett; Mason Alexander Park; Nanrisa Lee; Ernie Hudson; Eliza Taylor; Peter Gadiot
- Composer: Daniel James Chan
- Country of origin: United States
- Original language: English
- No. of seasons: 2
- No. of episodes: 31

Production
- Executive producers: Donald P. Bellisario; Martin Gero; Steven Lilien; Bryan Wynbrandt; Deborah Pratt; Helen Shaver; Dean Georgaris
- Producer: Raymond Lee
- Running time: 42 minutes
- Production companies: Dean Georgaris Entertainment 2.0; Quinn's House; Universal Content Productions; Universal Television

Original release
- Network: NBC
- Release: September 19, 2022 – February 20, 2024

Related
- Quantum Leap (1989–1993)

Quantum Leap is an American science fiction television series that aired on NBC. Developed by Steven Lilien and Bryan Wynbrandt, it is a revival of the 1989 show created by Donald P. Bellisario. Bellisario, Lilien and Wynbrandt executive produce. It takes place in 2022, thirty years after the original show concluded. The series stars Raymond Lee as the new lead character Dr. Ben Song, along with Caitlin Bassett, Mason Alexander Park, Nanrisa Lee, and Ernie Hudson. Quantum Leap premiered on September 19, 2022. In December 2022, the series was renewed for a second season consisting of 13 episodes, which premiered on October 4, 2023. In April 2024, NBC canceled the series after two seasons.

== Premise ==
Thirty years have passed since Dr. Samuel "Sam" Beckett vanished into the Quantum Leap accelerator. The United States Department of Defense has restarted the Quantum Leap project with a new team trying to recreate the accelerator and retrieve Beckett from the past. For reasons unknown, Dr. Ben Song, the new project's lead physicist, has uploaded new program code to Ziggy, the project's supercomputer and used the upgraded accelerator to leap back in time without informing anyone on the team as to why. He becomes stuck in the past just as Beckett did, living the lives of other people and changing history for the better. However, his leaps appear to have a trajectory to take him to a specific point in spacetime. Project employee Addison Augustine, who is Ben's fiancée, acts as his liaison with the project, appearing to him as a hologram that only he can see and hear, just as the previous project's observer Al Calavicci did for Beckett. Janis Calavicci, Al's daughter, who was excluded from the revived Quantum Leap project, is known to have colluded with Ben in changing the system's code, but her reasons are unknown.

== Cast ==
=== Main ===
- Raymond Lee as Ben Song, the lead physicist working on Quantum Leap who gets stuck in the past, leaping into the bodies of different people, while also having partial amnesia about his identity as a result of leaping
- Caitlin Bassett as Addison Augustine, Ben's fiancée and hologram, who was meant to be the leaper for the new project
- Mason Alexander Park as Ian Wright, the chief technician of the Quantum Leap artificial intelligence
- Nanrisa Lee as Jenn Chou, the Quantum Leap head of security
- Ernie Hudson as Herbert "Magic" Williams, head of the Quantum Leap time travel project, and a Vietnam War veteran into whom Sam Beckett leaped in the original series' Season 3 1990 episode "The Leap Home (Part 2) – Vietnam" (played by Christopher Kirby in the original series)
- Peter Gadiot as Tom Westfall (season 2), a U.S. Army Intelligence officer, formerly of the Special Forces, and Addison's new love interest
- Eliza Taylor as Hannah Carson (season 2), initially a waitress in New Mexico in 1949, she is knowledgeable in physics and shows up in subsequent leaps in 1955 (Princeton University), 1961 (Cairo), 1970 (rural New Jersey), 1974 (Baltimore) and 1976 (Sonoma)

=== Recurring ===
- Susan Diol as Beth Calavicci, the wife of Al Calavicci (reprising her role from the original series)
- Georgina Reilly as Janis Calavicci, the daughter of Al Calavicci
- Walter Perez as Richard Martinez/Leaper X, a rogue leaper sent back in time to stop the project (season 1)
- Alice Kremelberg as Rachel, Ian's girlfriend

=== Guest ===
==== Season 1 ====
- Deborah Pratt as Ziggy
- Michael Welch as Ryan
- Michael Malarkey as Cole
- Carly Pope as Samantha Stratton
- José Zúñiga as Commander Jim Reynolds
- Álex González as Marco
- Justin Hartley as Jake
- Sofia Pernas as Tammy Jean Jessup
- Mark Damon Espinoza as Alberto Sandoval
- Yaani King Mondschein as Frankie
- Jewel Staite as Naomi Harvey
- Casey Simpson as Corey
- Elyse Levesque as Lola Gray
- Kerri Medders as Daisy Gray
- Josh Meyers as Percival Gray
- Chido Nwokocha as Dr. Felix Watts
- Kurt Yaeger as Ringer
- Deborah Ann Woll as Carly Farmer
- Karissa Lee Staples as Jamie Farmer
- Daniel Bonjour as Trevor Dunn
- Tate Moore as Loretta
- Sumalee Montano as Carolina Carlo
- Eugene Byrd as Dr. Harper
- Stan Shaw as Eli Jackson
- François Chau as Louis Tann
- Johari Johnson as Senior Nurse
- Robert Picardo as Dr. Edwin Woolsey
- Matt Glave as Colonel Jack Parker
- Joe Dinicol as Eugene Wagner
- Brandon Routh as Alexander Augustine, Addison's father
- Patrick Fischler as Dr. Mueller
- Davida Williams as Leslie Drobis
- Bart Johnson as Paul Kirk

==== Season 2 ====
- François Arnaud as Curtis Bailey
- Aaron Abrams as Ronny Abrams
- P. J. Byrne as Enock Abrams
- Melissa Roxburgh as Ellen Grier
- Janet Montgomery as Rebecca Egan
- Graham Patrick Martin as Sean Egan
- Louis Herthum as Sheriff Woodrow Morgan
- William deVry as General Austin Murray
- Tim Matheson as Neal Russell
- Erica Gimpel as Laura Evans
- C. S. Lee as Jin Park
- Benjamin Flores Jr. as Dwain
- Cullen Douglas as Dr. Karl Donovan
- Brian Van Holt as Magistrate Bloodhorne
- Azita Ghanizada as Layla Adel
- Lou Diamond Phillips as Shepherd Barnes
- David Clayton Rogers as Kevin Zatt
- Josh Dean as Josh Nally
- Alicia Lagano as Elena Carr
- Dan Bakkedahl as Milton Wells
- Keon Alexander as Ricardo Baragan
- Nadine Ellis as Connie Davis
- John Marshall Jones as Davidson Best
- James Frain as Gideon Rydge
- Wyatt Parker as Jeffrey Nally

== Episodes ==
=== Series overview ===
Season	Episodes	Originally released		Rank	Average viewership (in millions)	Ref
Season	Episodes	First released	Last released	Rank	Average viewership (in millions)	Ref
1	18	September 19, 2022	April 3, 2023	58	3.89	
2	13	October 4, 2023	February 20, 2024	66	3.56	

=== Season 1 (2022–23) ===
No. overall	No. in season	Title	Directed by	Written by	Leap details (Name, date & location)	Original release date	U.S. viewers (millions)
1	1	"July 13th, 1985"	Thor Freudenthal	Steven Lilien & Bryan Wynbrandt (Note: In the Citytv airing of the episode, Martin Gero also received writing credit.)	Nick Rounder/Matt Shaw; July 13, 1985; Philadelphia, Pennsylvania	September 19, 2022	3.35
Dr. Ben Song celebrates his engagement to Addison Augustine and receives mysterious texts during the party that lead him to make an unauthorized leap in the Project Accelerator. Awakening in 1985 as an undercover cop, he stops a plot to steal the Hope Diamond. Suffering amnesia from the leap, Ben is aided by Addison working as his hologram guide. In 2022, the new Project Quantum Leap (PQL) team tries both to find out why Ben leapt and bring him back. Note: The episode is dedicated to Dean Stockwell, who played Al in the original series and died on November 7, 2021. Both Stockwell and Scott Bakula, who played Sam Beckett, appear in the episode via archive photos.
2	2	"Atlantis"	David McWhirter	Robert Hull	David Tamura; March 7, 1998; Space Shuttle Atlantis	September 26, 2022	2.77
Ben leaps into David Tamura, an astronaut aboard the Space Shuttle Atlantis in 1998. Ben remembers that David was one of his childhood heroes, triggering some of Song's memory. Ziggy predicts that Ben is there to save David from being killed by debris during a spacewalk. Ben is successful, but the debris instead damages the shuttle's heat shield, which changes history so that the entire crew dies when Atlantis disintegrates during re-entry. Ben convinces the crew to seek assistance from the Mir space station, but the cosmonauts are asleep. Ben engages in a daring jump from the shuttle to the station to get the cosmonauts' attention and succeeds in saving the crew. In 2022, Addison shows Ian a flash drive Ben left in their apartment, but asks Ian to keep it quiet after Magic reveals Ben's connection to Janis and orders her to withhold Ben's memories from him until they determine why he leapt. Meanwhile, Magic and Jenn contact Al's widow, Beth, to locate Janis. Beth later calls Janis, leading Magic and Jenn to a house. The two arrive to find servers, as well as calculations in Ben's handwriting. Magic receives a call from Janis, who reveals that Ben contacted her for help and warns Magic to stay out of their way. Magic and Jenn escape Janis' booby trap and later retrieve an encrypted hard drive. Addison and Ian reveal that their flash drive, when combined with the hard drive, unlocks data revealing that it is Ben's intent to reach a precise moment in history, but it remains unclear when, where, or why Ben decided to do so.
3	3	"Somebody Up There Likes Ben"	Marcus Stokes	Drew Lindo	Danny "Youngblood" Hill; October 2, 1977; Las Vegas, Nevada	October 3, 2022	2.58
Ben leaps into Danny "Youngblood" Hill, a prizefighter in 1977, the day before his bout for the world middleweight championship. Addison informs him that Danny originally lost the fight because he was distracted and they assume it's due to Danny's girlfriend Angela, who is attached to Danny's opponent. They soon learn, however, that Danny's distraction is his trainer and older brother, Darryl, a Vietnam veteran suffering from PTSD who committed suicide following Danny's loss. Ben makes Darryl promise to seek help and then, with coaching from Darryl and Addison, wins the fight. Addison informs Ben that his leaps are likely to continue for some time as Ian discovered that Ben's code is taking him on a path towards the mystery point in spacetime. Ben tells Addison that he had a memory when he got knocked down during the fight, but leaps before he can say more. In 2022, Addison is suffering from exhaustion due to her singular focus on getting Ben home. After she collapses in the imaging chamber, Magic forces her to slow down and, following Ben's leap, Magic, Ian, and Jenn join Addison at her home to help her unwind and relax. While there, Magic receives a call from Beth, who informs him that Janis contacted her and stole artifacts from the original project that Al had in his possession. One such item was Al's old handlink to Ziggy, which Janis is using to help build her own imaging chamber.
4	4	"A Decent Proposal"	Rachel Talalay	Moira Kirland	Eva Sandoval; July 29, 1981; Los Angeles, California	October 10, 2022	2.46
Ben's first leap into a woman is into Eva Sandoval, a bounty hunter in 1981 Los Angeles. Addison tells Ben he's there to locate Tammy Jean Jessup (Sofia Pernas), a bail skip, but inadvertently ruins a proposal to Eva from her boyfriend and partner, Jake (Justin Hartley). It is revealed that Tammy Jean is on the run from the cartel and is trying to flee town with her boyfriend, Zack. Ben and Jake track her to Zack's club, only to discover that Tammy Jean is Carla, the head of the cartel, and watch as she kills Zack. Ben and Jake are able to stop her and send her to jail, with Ben also managing to save Jake and Eva's relationship. Ben then remembers his relationship with Addison before leaping into the Old West. In 2022, Ziggy is still running slow while Ian tries to limit Janis' access into the system. Jenn reveals to Addison that Ben has been keeping secrets from the team for the past six months, while Magic shares with Ian his own history with Quantum Leap, recounting the time Sam leapt into him in Vietnam and that he restarted the project to honor Sam and, if possible, get him home. Ian and Jenn resolve to save Ben from the same fate as Sam and bring him home.
5	5	"Salvation or Bust"	Silas Howard	Benjamin Raab & Deric A. Hughes	Diego de la Cruz; 1879; Salvation, California	October 17, 2022	2.41
Ben lands in Salvation, an Old West town on the verge of destruction by a railroad company, in the body of aged ex-gunslinger Diego de la Cruz, who was summoned by his granddaughter to help save the town from a dangerous outlaw gang hired by the railroad to drive the townsfolk away. Ben, a pacifist, tries to overcome his moral qualms when Addison informs him that he'll have to beat the outlaw leader, Josiah McDonough, in order to leap. Ben rallies the townsfolk to rig a series of traps for McDonough and his gang so they can collect a large bounty to save the town and then informs them of a large vein of copper nearby that will keep them financially stable for years to come. Before Ben leaps, however, he and Addison are surprised to encounter a man in the town who knows Ben's name and that he is a time traveler, warning Ben to stop following him. Meanwhile, in 2022, the PQL team receives a surprise visit from Congresswoman Kavita Adani, who sits on the project's oversight committee, and tries to keep her from figuring out that Ben made an unauthorized leap. She does, anyway, but Magic convinces her to keep the project running by promising to find a way to save her brother, who died in a car accident in a vehicle that she was driving.
6	6	"What a Disaster!"	Helen Shaver; Chris Grismer	Story by : Steven Lilien & Bryan Wynbrant; Teleplay by : Steven Lilien & Bryan Wynbrant and Martin Gero	John Harvey; October 17, 1989; San Francisco, California	October 24, 2022	2.22
Ben leaps into John Harvey in San Francisco moments before the 1989 Loma Prieta earthquake. He learns he is there to help John's estranged wife, Naomi, save their son, Jason, who originally died in the aftermath of the earthquake. Meanwhile, Ben relives his memories of his deceased mother, who died after an argument with him. Ben finds Jason at the family's old apartment building in Oakland, but goes inside to help an old neighbor and is knocked unconscious by falling debris. Fortunately, Jason is able to revive him and they escape the building moments before it collapses. Ben also manages to repair the family's relationship and then uses a hospital phone to call his mother just as he leaps. Ben then awakens in a priest on Halloween. In 2022, the team tries to figure out the identity of the mystery Leaper encountered during Ben's previous leap. They learn he is Richard Martinez, a Marine stationed at Camp Pendleton. However, Martinez has no knowledge of the project and a clean record, which leads Magic and the team to theorize that Martinez will become the Leaper at an unspecified point in the future, making Ian realize that Ben is attempting to reach the future through his leaps.
7	7	"O Ye of Little Faith"	Chris Grismer	Margarita Matthews	Father James Davenport; October 31, 1934; Coventon, Maryland	October 31, 2022	2.33
Ben leaps into a priest who has been called to perform an exorcism on a patient named Daisy, who is supposedly possessed by a demon and has recently turned 18. Since Ben is not religious, he is uncomfortable performing an exorcism because it goes against his beliefs. Unknown interference prevents Addison from communicating with Ben. When Daisy's aunt is found dead in her room, her family debates whether Daisy murdered her or if the demon did it. Her aunt's will names Daisy to inherit all her money and possessions, which they suspect to be a motive. Ben later discovers that Daisy's symptoms are consistent with being exposed to certain poisons and figures out that Daisy's mother and uncle murdered her aunt and have been poisoning Daisy. Daisy's mother was unhappy with her husband and had been having an affair with her brother in law. After Daisy died, her uncle would be next in line to inherit her aunt's money, which Daisy's mother and uncle were going to use to start a new life together. Daisy's mother and uncle are arrested. Ben gets a message from Janis Calavicci (who was causing the interference preventing Addison from communicating with Ben) warning him, but he leaps before she can tell him why.
8	8	"Stand by Ben"	Avi Youabian	Emily Kim	Ben Winters; July 10, 1996; Lassen County, California	November 7, 2022	2.65
Ben leaps into Ben Winters, a teenager who escapes from an abusive academy for troubled youth with three other teens, Stacy, Roy, and Leah. Addison tells Ben he's there to save the kids, who got lost following a car crash and died of exposure. With Addison's guidance, Ben leads the kids towards an empty cabin. Though Leah breaks her ankle along the way, they make it to the cabin. Unfortunately, the school staff tracks them and Leah sacrifices herself to allow the others to escape. However, they enlist the help of Leah's uncle, a local news reporter, to expose the school's brutal practices and secure their release. Addison reveals that the kids go on to lead productive lives and remain friends to the present. Ben's experience with the kids triggers his memories of recruiting Janis and, before he leaps, he tells Addison that he finally remembers why he leapt in the first place: to save her. In 2022, Jenn uses the local power grid to track Janis' imaging chamber, but Janis sees them coming through PQL security feeds and locks down the facility to buy time to escape.
9	9	"Fellow Travelers"	David Grossman	Story by : Drew Lindo & Dean Georgaris; Teleplay by : Drew Lindo	Jack Armstrong; April 24, 1979; Chicago, Illinois	January 2, 2023	2.31
Ben leaps into 1979 Chicago as bodyguard Jack Armstrong, assigned to protect famous musician Carly Farmer from mysterious attempts on her life. Addison grows frustrated with Ben for leaping to save her life. Jamie, estranged sister of Carly, reappears in her life. Initially the suspect, Ben later realizes that Jamie was framed. Trevor, Carly's manager, becomes the next suspect and Ben exposes several threatening letters that Trevor used to frame Jamie. Carly fires Trevor and he later reveals that Loretta, one of the backup singers, also plans to kill Carly. Ben manages to subdue Loretta in time and save Carly, but he is wounded in the attempt. Ben promises Addison that he will trust her from here on out and reassures her that they are a team. In 2023, Ian uses Ziggy to track Janis to Belize. The team realizes they need Janis' help to save Addison, but she remains uncooperative and implies that the PQL cannot be trusted. Jenn brings Janis in for questioning, but wonders if there may be truth to Janis' story.
10	10	"Paging Dr. Song"	Tessa Blake	Benjamin Raab & Deric A. Hughes	Dr. Alexandra Tomkinson; 1994; Seattle, Washington	January 9, 2023	1.75
Ben leaps into a doctor at a hospital where victims of a train crash are being admitted. His mission is to save the lives of three people. He saves one person by encouraging him to sit still while he removes debris lodged in his head. His wife died in the crash, but Ben encourages him to donate his wife's heart to another crash victim, saving the life of Ben's second patient, who died in the original timeline due to a reaction to an experimental drug used during anesthesia. Ben changes the order to a different drug, but is caught. Though the patient has one operation under the drug, Ben prevents the drug from being used for her second operation. Ben exposes the risks of this drug and saves hundreds of lives. The third is a man who is discovered to have a brain tumor, but does not want to get treatment due to the bad life he feels he has lived, including being an absent father to the friend of the doctor into whom Ben leapt. At headquarters, Janis Calavicci tells Addison to tell Ben not to reveal any more of what he remembers about why he leaped in the first place, since someone at Project Quantum Leap cannot be trusted.
11	11	"Leap. Die. Repeat."	Pamela Romanowsky	Margarita Matthews	Colonel Jack Parker, Eugene Wagner, Mallory Yang, Dr. Edwin Woolsey, Moe Murphy; September 12, 1962; Fort Worth, Texas	January 30, 2023	2.10
Ben leaps into a colonel in an elevator with four other people. These people have come to see the initial power up of a highly experimental nuclear reactor. Nevertheless, something goes very wrong and everyone in the facility (including Ben) dies. While the people at headquarters are experiencing the initial grief of losing Ben, their monitors of his vital signs indicate that he is alive. Ben has leapt into a different person who was in the elevator and gets another try at preventing the disaster. However, it soon becomes apparent that Ben can only leap into each person present in the elevator once before Ben dies permanently. Back in 2023, the team has no choice but to ask Janis for help with this 'quantum loop.' In the end, Janis agrees to tell Addison the name of the person who told Ben to leap in the first place.
12	12	"Let Them Play"	Morenike Joela Evans; Shakina	Shakina	Carlos Mendéz; 2012; Los Angeles, California	February 6, 2023	1.75
Ben leaps into Carlos Mendéz, a high school basketball coach in 2012 whose daughter, Gia, struggles with backlash over being a transgender student and athlete, particularly from the mother of one of her teammates. The main uproar stems from Ben putting her in a game, as she was only allowed to remain on the team for practices, not competitions. Ben struggles to protect Gia from the community and prevent her from running away and disappearing, as she did in the original history. In 2023, Magic and Jenn track down a trans poet named Dottie, who Janis revealed was the person who told Ben to leap. Listening to a new poem Dottie is performing, Magic realizes that a Leaper inhabited Dottie and spoke to Ben. Dottie shows Magic a drawing of the Leaper's face and Magic is surprised to see that the picture seems to be of Ian.
13	13	"Family Style"	Deborah M. Pratt	Aadrita Mukerji	Kamini Prasad; September 2009; Portland, Oregon	February 27, 2023	2.02
Ben leaps into Kamini Prasad, the daughter of Indian immigrants working as a chef in her family's restaurant. The restaurant has been struggling since Kamini's father died a year prior; Ben learns that the family owes their landlord $30,000 in back rent and that he has arrived on the day the restaurant is burned down in an insurance scam. Ben promises the landlord, Kathy, that they'll deliver a full house as a down payment on the back rent. Kamini's sister, Manisha, tries to convince their mother, Sonali, to let her try new recipes to bring in more customers; Ben lists the restaurant on Groupon to help promote the business and also contacts a local restaurateur as a possible angel investor. Sonali approves of the Groupon idea, but rejects Manisha's new recipes, saying that they can't afford to take risks on such an important night, prompting Manisha to quit in frustration. After one of their employees falls asleep on the job and the other ducks out, Sonali tries to do the work herself, but ends up cutting herself and passing out, triggering Ben's memory of his own mother's death. Ben is able to convince Sonali and Manisha to patch things up, but the family returns to the restaurant to find that Kathy burned it down. Ben instead borrows a wedding reception venue from a local family while several of the Prasad family's relatives and friends come together to help with the dinner. Sonali lets Manisha take charge and, afterwards, the family offers to help the Prasads find a new location. Addison reveals that the new restaurant is a thriving success, while Kathy is to jail for insurance fraud. In 2023, Ian is struggling with the revelation that they are the one who sent Ben leaping. Frustrated and concerned that they put Ben in harm's way, they start obsessing over figuring out why they did it until Magic orders Ian to take a day off to decompress. Ian decides to visit their old partner, Rachel, who reassures them that they are a good person who always wants to help people. Ian returns to the project with renewed focus.
14	14	"S.O.S."	Chris Grismer	Dean Georgaris	Commander Rossi; May 2, 1989; U.S.S. Montana, South China Sea	March 6, 2023	2.19
Ben leaps into Commander Rossi aboard the U.S.S. Montana, whose crew includes XO Alexander Augustine, Addison’s father. Commander Augustine had been disgraced after a nearby submarine, the U.S.S. Tampa, sank, leading to the death of its crew despite the Montana's close proximity. Ben has to save the members of the Tampa, but the Montana's captain initially declines, thinking the SOS they received was a ploy by the Chinese. Ben proves the signal came from an American ship but, after the Montana hits a Chinese mine, the captain orders them to fire on the Chinese vessel trailing them, the Han, which would spark World War III. Augustine is sent to his quarters when he objects. By working with Augustine, Ben convinces the crew to mutiny and prevent the Montana from firing on the Han, instead getting the codes to remotely detonate the mines and clear a path to the Tampa. Afterwards, Ben is standing on the tail of the ship when he is confronted by another sailor—Richard Martinez, in the body of the communications sailor he'd been working with, though had never met.
15	15	"Ben Song for the Defense"	Kristen Windell	Romy Loor	Aleyda Ramirez; 1985; Queens, New York	March 13, 2023	2.28
Ben leaps into public defender Aleyda Ramirez, who must defend Camilo Diaz, a teenager wrongfully accused of killing a gang recruiter, while also juggling several other cases. In the original timeline, Diaz pleaded guilty to manslaughter, but his brother joined the gang and died as a result. Jenn joins Ben, as she has prior legal experience, although Ben does not initially recognize her. Ben finds that the prosecutor has hidden a witness who would later be accused of two other murders, but Aleyda's ADA girlfriend is fired when she asks the prosecutor about it. The prosecutor offers Ben a plea deal that would get Camilo in jail for only five years, allowing him to move from Queens with his family and prevent his brother's death, which would also allow Ben to leap, but Ben doesn't take it. With the help of another client, Ben finds the gun used in the shooting and makes the case for Camilo, who is found not guilty, whereas the prosecutor loses his job for involvement in multiple cover-ups.
16	16	"Ben, Interrupted"	Jude Weng	Annelise Kollevoll Medina	Liam O'Connor; 1954; Georges Island, Boston, Massachusetts	March 20, 2023	1.92
Ben leaps to Georges Island Asylum as private detective Liam O'Connor, who was hired to rescue his client's sister Judith Sullivan, held there for hysteria. Janis Calavicci removes her ankle monitor so Magic will arrive, warning him that Ben must sabotage the leap. Posing as a patient, Ben and Judith use a vent to crawl into the head doctor’s office and find his files, but they are caught. Martinez leaps into one of the attendants, helping Ben escape his room. The two then team up to take on and knock out the head doctor before he can perform a lobotomy on Judith. Judith climbs up a ladder and escapes with her sister, allowing her to release the files and get the head doctor's license revoked, but when Ben climbs up to escape he is suddenly stabbed in the neck by Martinez, who then leaves. Ben manages to climb up and make it to a nearby car; he is able to honk the horn and alert two nearby nurses to aid him. Janis tells Magic that she has figured out who the traitor on the Quantum Leap team is—Ziggy.
17	17	"The Friendly Skies"	Linda Mendoza	Alex Berger	Lois Mitchell; August 5, 1971; Transglobal Airlines Flights 349, over the Atlantic Ocean	March 27, 2023	2.25
Ben leaps to Lois Mitchell, a flight attendant flying from London to New York on a flight destined to crash. In addition, the team disables Ziggy following the previous episode's events, although the imaging chamber is still active. After finding the pilot and flight engineer dead from poison, Ben realizes the flight was hijacked before it crashed. Ben initially suspects an Irish flight attendant, Holly, with possible IRA connections but, after a rich heir on board, Corey, notices the emergency equipment is open, his caretaker Leslie reveals herself to be the hijacker. Working with the co-pilot and two mercenaries, Leslie takes control of the plane. Ben and Holly take out one hijacker while the second is attacked by a passenger, who is non-fatally shot. Ben and Corey use a concoction to knock out Leslie and the co-pilot, but find that the fired bullet has damaged the hydraulics. With the help of Ian, Ben is able to successfully land the plane in Puerto Rico. In his next leap, Ben arrives in the destroyed Quantum Leap facility and it is snowing. Greeted by an older Ian, Ben realizes he is in the future, experiencing a nuclear winter.
18	18	"Judgment Day"	Chris Grismer	Margarita Matthews	2051; Los Angeles, California; Ben Song; 2018; Los Angeles, California; Liam O'Connor; 1954; Boston, Massachusetts; Commander Rossi; May 2, 1989; U.S.S. Montana; Diego de la Cruz; 1879; Salvation, California	April 3, 2023	2.16
Future Ian tells Ben that Martinez was sent to kill Addison and end Quantum Leap, because the future was bad and the government at that time thought that the project was the cause of the problems. They give Ben a code to give to past Ian. In 2018, Ben leaps to his past self and goes on a date with Addison, but ends it early and tells her the truth. He goes to headquarters but Addison, suspicious he is not the real Ben, tries to apprehend him. Jenn initiates lockdown, but Martinez has already leapt into Magic. Martinez convinces them that Ben is an impostor and he is put in a cell. Ben convinces Jenn and Ian he is the real Ben by giving them Jenn’s password, while Addison realizes Magic is a fake after finding cigars Magic promised to deliver to Al Calavicci. Ben and Martinez fight in the accelerator and Addison is shot before Ben and Martinez are thrown into their past leaps. Martinez is about to shoot Ben, but a friend of the latter (from "Salvation or Bust") shoots the former. Ian realizes the code requires all three versions of them and uses it to transport Ben back to 2018, Martinez being lost to time. After Ben and Addison kiss, the 2023 team prepares for him to leap to the present day.

=== Season 2 (2023–24) ===
No. overall	No. in season	Title	Directed by	Written by	Leap details (Name, date & location)	Original release date	U.S. viewers (millions)
19	1	"This Took Too Long!"	John Terlesky	Martin Gero	Perez; 1978; Russia	October 4, 2023	2.90
Ben is dismayed to find he is still leaping and has leaped into an Air Force cargo plane over Russia that is carrying a mysterious crate. The plane is shot down by a Russian surface-to-air missile (SAM) and Ben and the crew discover their crate contained only bricks, as they were the decoy for another target. Ben and the crew work together to reach a communication site to radio for help, but find it's actually the SAM site that shot them down and is now targeting three other American planes. The crew use a stolen truck and trip mine to destroy the site and save the planes. After working through the entire leap without support from PQL, Ben finally receives contact from Ian, who reveals that they have been searching for Ben for three years, during which time the Project was shut down and everything changed.
20	2	"Ben & Teller"	Kristin Windell	Aadrita Mukerji	Lorena Chaves; May 9, 1986; Tucson, Arizona	October 11, 2023	2.62
While Ian gathers the rest of the team, Ben leaps into elderly bank teller Lorena Chaves on the day of a bank robbery, with one robber, Sean, being the brother of Lorena's coworker Rebecca. In the original timeline, police stormed in and eight died in the shootout. Ben acts as a liaison between the police and robbers, convincing them to release two hostages. The head robber has Ben put in the safe code, but the imaging chamber shuts down while Ian recites it, though Ben guesses the last bit correctly. The Quantum Leap team is arrested, but Addison's boyfriend gets them released. Ben learns in the new timeline the shootout hits a gas line, causing an explosion, but there’s a meeting room with drywall leading to safety. He convinces the robbers to leave them there before breaking through. Before Ben and Rebecca leave, the head robber discovers them and is about to kill Rebecca when Sean shoots him. Rebecca takes the gun from Sean and, although Sean takes the blame for the shooting, it's ruled self-defense and he is released after five years. Jenn confronts Ian over how they really discovered Ben was alive; Ben realizes that something is different about Addison.
21	3	"Closure Encounters"	Chris Grismer	Romy Loor	Robert Cook; 1949; Starlight, New Mexico	October 18, 2023	2.75
Ben leaps into Project Sign investigator Robert Cook, who has been sent to investigate a crash that put a girl named Melanie Hunt in a coma and injured her friend Carrie Baker, Sheriff Morgan's granddaughter. Carrie claims she and Melanie ran through the woods after a UFO ran them off the road, but police found Melanie still in the car. Melanie's powerful father wants Carrie to be arrested. The team deduces Hunt must have used a helicopter to cause the crash. Ben and Morgan are followed by a helicopter near Hunt's ranch and a signal-jammer kicks Addison out of the imaging chamber. Ben exits the car and runs but passes out, waking up in a bed the next morning. Ben realizes he and Melanie have the same marks on their necks and that she had been drugged as part of a cover up for seeing a ranch Hunt had leased to the military for testing. Morgan prepares to skip town with Carrie before Ben intercepts him with a plan. After leaving Melanie with an intelligent waitress named Hannah Carson, Ben purposely gets abducted near the ranch, where Morgan takes photos and Addison observes the base. They confront a General and get him to remedy Carrie's charges and move the base from New Mexico to Area 51. In return for her help, before leaping, Ben alerts Hannah to Professor Yates opening his physics program at Princeton to women, telling her "to go live the life she wants to live."
22	4	"The Lonely Hearts Club"	M. J. Bassett	Kristy Lowrey	Summer Walsh; April 4, 2000; Los Angeles, California	October 25, 2023	2.52
Magic introduces Addison’s boyfriend Tom Westfall to the team. Ben leaps into Summer Walsh, the assistant of actor Neal Russell. In the original timeline, Neal died in a boating accident after missing a TV appearance. After Neal goes missing, Ben realizes he’s at his ex-wife Laura's wedding. Addison says Ben has to get Neal to The Tonight Show to promote his memoir, but Ben instead tries to get him and Laura back together. Neal gets arrested while stealing his old tuxedo from a wax museum, but Ben gets him freed. Ian tells Jenn there's been a security breach tracking Ben's leaps. The team realizes Neal's publicist is his daughter from an old marriage, but Ben still wants to get Neal and Laura back together. Neal gives Laura a flower, but she tells him it's time to move on. Neal tells Ben to drive him to the marina, but Ben takes Neal to his daughter's house instead. Neal and his daughter reconnect; telling the whole story to Jay Leno propels Neal back into the spotlight. Tom suggests to Magic that it might not be possible for the leaper to come home.
23	5	"One Night in Koreatown"	Tamika Miller	Benjamin Raab & Deric A. Hughes	Daniel Park; April 29, 1992; Los Angeles, California	November 1, 2023	3.00
Ben leaps into Daniel Park, the son of Koreatown shoe store owner Jin, on the day the LA riots start. In the original timeline, Jin was killed defending the store from looters. Magic joins Ben instead of Addison. Ben tries leaving with customer Luisa, but finds her car has been destroyed, so they return. Daniel's brother Sonny informs Ben all the roads out of Koreatown have been cut off. Beth confronts Magic over his drinking. After Jin refuses to let Sonny's black business partner Dwain in, they argue over Sonny's plans to start a shoe business. Ben and Sonny find Dwain and then Sonny leaves to gather supplies. Magic confides in Jenn about his experiences in the summer of 1967. Rioters steal much of the merchandise, but Ben and the others survive. The team learns Jin survives the new timeline, but someone else dies. Jin points his gun at Dwain after an argument. When Sonny enters, Jin shoots him, mistaking him for a looter. They take Sonny to an ambulance, but police point guns at Dwain before Jin intervenes. Sonny survives and builds a shoe empire with Dwain. Magic agrees to get help for his alcoholism.
24	6	"Secret History"	Pamela Romanowsky	Drew Lindo	Professor Henry McCoy; May 15, 1955; Princeton, New Jersey	November 15, 2023	3.00
Ben leaps into a Princeton University professor and sees another professor murdered. That professor had corresponded with the recently deceased Albert Einstein about a missing formula. Ben is greeted by Hannah Carson, who he first met during his leap in New Mexico. They find a clue to Einstein's missing formula, but it changes the timeline to cause Hannah's death. After a cyberattack temporarily shuts down Ziggy, Tom substitutes for Jenn in the imaging chamber. They find a hidden room in the library, but are attacked by a knife-wielding Nazi as a fire breaks out. Ben disarms the Nazi, a Project Paperclip recruit and the professor's killer. Hannah starts translating the journal, but Tom tells Ben it's for a bomb. When Hannah refuses to stop translating, Ben tells her he’s a time traveler. Hannah burns the formula. Ian asks Rachel to work against her employers, who are holding Quantum Leap's system hostage. Her company built the new chip Quantum Leap is using and remotely disabled it. Rachel provides a workaround to prevent the chip from sending leap data to her employers. Ben learns Hannah's boss Donovan is another Nazi, who then pulls weapons on them, but Hannah uses a magnet to disarm Donovan. He is arrested and Hannah's work is published under her own name. Jenn and Ian confront the blackmailer, who shuts down the chip's data download. Ben kisses Hannah before leaping.
25	7	"A Kind of Magic"	Avi Youabian	Margarita Matthews	Elizabeth Bleeker; September 25, 1692; Middletowne, Massachusetts	December 6, 2023	2.53
Ben leaps into a 1692 servant-girl whose boss Goody Smith is accused of causing a drought that killed her husband. During the funeral, the magistrate's son William collapses, but Ben saves him with CPR, causing the townsfolk to accuse him of witchcraft. A third woman, Morgan McKenna, defends both of them and is also accused. On trial, Ben calls William, but he sides with the allegations and the three are jailed. While Ian tries to contact their ancestor with a séance, Ben grabs the keys from the jailkeeper and they escape. They head to Morgan's shop, but find it looted. After finding one horse missing, Morgan flees by herself on the other. As the townsfolk gather outside, William finds Ben and Goody and hides them in an apple cart. On the way to Boston, Jenn tells Ben that Morgan was caught. Goody wants to continue to Boston, which would allow Ben to leap, but Ben convinces her to go back to Middletowne. Addison tells Ben it's about to rain and end the drought, so he convinces the town God has sent a message. After realizing the sulfur-tainted well was the cause of the dehydration, Ben asks Addison to be his hologram again, having accepted her new relationship with Tom.
26	8	"Nomads"	Chris Grismer	Dean Georgaris	Michael Allison; May 1961; Cairo, Egypt	December 13, 2023	2.76
Ben leaps into a CIA agent in Egypt, 1961. The station chief, Shepherd Barnes, instructs him to meet with an Egyptologist named Layla, who has a planned meeting with an informant that may lead to a traitor. In the present day, Addison and Tom are cooking together; when he leaves to take a call, she discovers a ring box in a drawer. In Egypt, Layla wants Ben to photograph the meeting discreetly; Barnes instead forces him to plant a listening device. Ben reunites with Hannah; because she knows about his leaping, he enlists her help to work the bug, which he plants in the wrong building and has to move. With evidence of the traitor, Barnes allows for Ben to pick up Layla, but their cover is blown and they run separately from the Stasi. Ben escapes and learns later from Barnes that Layla was killed. Thinking he's stranded in time for failing to complete his mission, Ben makes plans to stay with Hannah. Barnes calls — Layla did manage to escape, but the Stasi are hunting her. With Addison's help, they determine where Layla is hiding and extract her. Ben leaps after another kiss with Hannah. In the present, Tom gives Addison a pouch that he says contains information that may bring Ben home.
27	9	"Off the Cuff"	Joe Menendez	Alex Berger	Nick Peterson; April 10, 1970; Trenton, New Jersey	January 30, 2024	1.70
Ben leaps into a bounty hunter handcuffed to fugitive Kevin Zatt, a lawyer with a "radical selfishness" philosophy who was originally murdered by arms dealer Sonny Fox, from whom he stole. The information that might bring Ben home (that Tom gave Addison) includes computer code "DARPA Code Collections" from a scrapped DARPA project whose engineers were not named; Ian starts studying it. Ben avoids a hitman who tries to kill Kevin, but crashes his vehicle in the process. Ben calls Peterson’s boss Elena Carr to try and contact Hannah, but she can't find her. They board a Greyhound bus, but jump off after Addison tells Ben another enforcer is on board. Ben injures his shoulder and decides to visit Josh Nally, Kevin's estranged doctor foster brother, at his home in Stockton. There, Ben learns Hannah is now married to Josh and has a son, Jeffrey. Ben and Hannah speak privately, but then find Kevin taking stolen diamonds out of the teddy bears he had been sending to Jeffrey. Ian learns Carr is working for Fox. Ben and Hannah rig a trap that stuns two of the hitmen, with Kevin knocking out Carr. Ben lets Kevin go and he escapes to South America, but Addison tells Ben that Josh dies of an aneurysm in 18 months. Ben tries to warn Hannah, but leaps before he can. Tom proposes to Addison, who accepts.
28	10	"The Family Treasure"	Jude Weng	Shakina	Nadia Malek; 1953; Mexico	February 6, 2024	1.58
Ben leaps into Nadia Malek during her father's will reading. He and Nadia's siblings Dina (who prefers being called Dean) and Sarah find pieces of a map in their inherited items leading to a treasure in Mexico. In the original timeline, Dean disappeared looking for the treasure. Rachel tells Ian that her boss Gideon Rydge knows there's a mole in his company; Jenn reminds Ian of their need in the past to find Ben and that Gideon was the only person with money and access to make the quantum chip that made it possible to retrack Ben. At a tavern, the siblings find a photo of their father near a well, but realize the bartender has stolen their map. Despite this, they head to the well and find tunnels underground. In the tunnels, Ben finds a crevice with a fake rock. Sarah finds a key there, but the bartender and the will lawyer find them. The lawyer kills the bartender, mentions a church, and tries to take the key, causing a cave-in that kills him. After escaping the cave, Dean comes out as non-binary and Sarah tells them she's leaving her husband. They find the church and the chest, but opening it causes a flood. The chest is empty but for a letter from their father. Addison postpones her elopement. Ben writes a letter to Hannah and asks Sarah to send it later, then realizes the hidden treasure was behind a family portrait. Gideon arrives at PQL headquarters. Note: The Spanish broadcast of this episode ends with information regarding a phone service for support related to transgender and LGBTI issues.
29	11	"The Outsider"	Deborah M. Pratt	Teleplay by : Rammy Park & Margarita Matthews; Story by : Rammy Park	Brian Conway; 1982; Denver, Colorado	February 13, 2024	1.34
Ben leaps into Brian, a cameraman for disgraced journalist Connie Davis as he receives a warning phone call. After Ben films a report, Addison tells him the letter he sent worked, but Josh died regardless. He tries to call Hannah, but only gets her answering machine. A masked man attacks Ben in a parking garage after he fails to call Hannah. Tom returns, this time representing the DOD. Ben learns Brian met a lawyer and uncovers Herbicore CEO Chet Barlowe, whose pesticide caused numerous cancer deaths. Connie learns Ben's source is Chet's brother Robbie. They confront Robbie, who tells them they need evidence before going public. Ben remembers the farmer they interviewed used Herbicore and gets a soil sample. They cover an explosion and realize Robbie died in it. Connie quits and tells Ben she left her last job when her source died, but Ben realizes Robbie faked his death and they find him at a motel. Connie convinces Robbie to give up the location of an incriminating memo. Ben opens Chet's safe, but the man from before, Herbicore's security chief, confronts him. After stopping him, the EPA bans the pesticide, Chet is arrested, and Connie becomes a famed journalist. Tom leaves and says goodbye to Addison. Magic resigns to protect Ian and Jenn.
30	12	"As the World Burns"	Pamela Romanowsky	Benjamin Raab & Deric A. Hughes	Otis Burton; 1974; Baltimore, Maryland	February 20, 2024	1.38
Ben is unexpectedly reunited with Hannah and her son Jeffrey when he leaps into Captain Burton, a firefighter responding to a call at her apartment in Baltimore in 1974. The situation takes a turn for the worse when the building undergoes a series of explosions caused by substandard wiring and Ben must struggle to make sure Hannah and her son survive. When Hannah gets trapped under fallen rubble, she implores Ben to save Jeffrey while Addison watches over her. Hannah reveals to Addison that the DARPA code is her discovery and shows her the final equation needed to complete it. Ben is able to successfully save both Jeffrey and Hannah, but Jeffrey discovers the letter Ben sent warning of Josh's death and grows suspicious. Back in the present, Magic has departed as head of PQL and names Jenn interim director, but she is soon supplanted when Gideon Rydge shows up and announces he has been named the new head of the project.
31	13	"Against Time"	Chris Grismer	Drew Lindo	Rick Jarrett, Jr. 1976; Sonoma, California	February 20, 2024	1.36
Gideon fires the entire PQL staff and replaces them with his own people. He then enters the imaging chamber to confront Ben, who has leaped into Ricky Jarret, Jr., a stock car driver in Sonoma, California in 1976, to prevent Ricky Sr. from dying after a heart attack. Gideon reveals he is the grown up Jeffrey who blames Ben for his father's death. Having learned Ben was a time traveler following the incident in Baltimore two years earlier, he made it his life's work to get revenge on Ben and take control of PQL to time travel for his own ends. Back in the present, Janis and Magic show up and recruit Addison, Jenn, and Ian, using Janis' imaging chamber to help Ben stop Jeffrey in the past while they also work to defeat Gideon in the present. Addison guides Ben to Hannah's house with the plan of destroying Jeffrey's first homemade computer, which would set his plans back by several years, while Jenn goes to PQL headquarters to stall Gideon from accessing the accelerator. Jenn is successful, but is killed by Gideon's men in the process. Ben reaches Hannah's house but, instead of destroying Jeffrey's computer, apologizes for failing to save Josh and convinces Jeffrey to help save Ricky Sr. They build a makeshift defibrillator and save him, inspiring Jeffrey to work for the betterment of mankind and causing a butterfly effect that changes the present. Jeffrey is now a philanthropist who is one of PQL's biggest donors and Jenn is alive and well. Ian is ready to use Hannah's code to bring Ben home, but someone must leap back and take his place. Addison volunteers and steps into the accelerator. However, instead of swapping places with Ben, they are both surprised and relieved to see they have leapt together. The two have an emotional reunion before they embark on their next adventure.

== Production ==
=== Development ===
In September 2021, Scott Bakula, who played main character Sam Beckett in the series, hinted that a reboot of the show was being considered, with creator Donald P. Bellisario returning in some capacity. A pilot episode was ordered by NBC the following January with plans for writers Steven Lilien and Bryan Wynbrandt to act as showrunners with executive producer Martin Gero and with original producer and writer Deborah Pratt. Helen Shaver was hired to direct the pilot episode and to serve as an executive producer as well. NBC ordered the revival with a full season pickup in May after viewing the test pilot.

After it received a full season order, Aadrita Mukerji and Dean Georgaris joined as additional executive producers, and Gero took over as showrunner while Lilien and Wynbrandt stayed with the series as executive producers. A new pilot was directed by Thor Freudenthal and written by Lilien and Wynbrandt, with the original pilot being scheduled to air later in the season. The decision not to launch the revival with the original premiere episode of the season was made in order to provide a better introduction in the series, and it was rescheduled as the sixth episode with some reshoots added for context.

In September 2022, Bakula confirmed that he had been asked by producers to reprise his role as Sam Beckett in the revival but had ultimately decided to not be involved with the new series, saying in a statement on Instagram, "As the show has always been near and dear to my heart, it was a very difficult decision to pass on the project".

After the first three episodes had aired, NBC ordered six additional episodes for the first season, bringing its total to 18 episodes. On December 12, 2022, NBC renewed the series for a second season consisting of 13 episodes, which premiered on October 4, 2023. The first 8 episodes of the second season went into production immediately after the first season wrapped, with no break in between because of the impending strikes. The final 5 episodes of the second season began filming on November 27, 2023, once the strikes had ended and there was time for pre-production. On April 5, 2024, NBC canceled the series after two seasons.

=== Casting ===
Raymond Lee was the first actor cast in the show, taking the lead role as Dr. Ben Song in March 2022. Shortly afterwards, the cast was filled out with Ernie Hudson, Nanrisa Lee, Mason Alexander Park, and Caitlin Bassett, making her television debut. After being ordered to series, Georgina Reilly joined the cast in a recurring role. In Season 2, two new series regulars were added: Eliza Taylor (The 100) and Peter Gadiot (Yellowjackets).

== Marketing and release ==
Quantum Leap premiered on September 19, 2022. The show is available to stream on Peacock, the NBC website, the NBC app, and via On-Demand on Comcast/Xfinity Systems for free with ads.

== Reception ==
=== Critical response ===
The review aggregator website Rotten Tomatoes reported a 57% approval rating for Season 1 with an average rating of 5.2/10, based on 23 critic reviews. The website's critics consensus reads, "This more serialized reboot of Quantum Leap has enough heart to merit a look from viewers with the luxury of time, but it often forgets to have fun with the episodic structure that made the original a classic." On Metacritic, the series has a weighted average score of 57 out of 100 based on nine critics, indicating "mixed or average reviews".

=== Ratings ===
==== Overall ====
Viewership and ratings per season of Quantum Leap
Season	Timeslot (ET)	Episodes	First aired		Last aired		TV season
Season	Timeslot (ET)	Episodes	Date	Viewers (millions)	Date	Viewers (millions)	TV season
1	Monday 10:00 p.m.	18	September 19, 2022	3.35	April 3, 2023	2.16	2022–23
2	Wednesday 8:00 p.m. (1–8); Tuesday 10:00 p.m. (9–11, 13); Tuesday 9:00 p.m. (12)	13	October 4, 2023	2.90	February 20, 2024	1.36	2023–24

==== Season 1 ====
Viewership and ratings per episode of Quantum Leap
No.	Title	Air date	Rating (18–49)	Viewers (millions)	DVR (18–49)	DVR viewers (millions)	Total (18–49)	Total viewers (millions)
1	"July 13, 1985"	September 19, 2022	0.5	3.35	0.3	2.17	0.7	5.52
2	"Atlantis"	September 26, 2022	0.3	2.77	0.3	1.90	0.6	4.67
3	"Somebody Up There Likes Ben"	October 3, 2022	0.4	2.58	0.3	1.98	0.6	4.56
4	"A Decent Proposal"	October 10, 2022	0.4	2.46	0.3	1.72	0.7	4.18
5	"Salvation or Bust"	October 17, 2022	0.4	2.41	0.3	1.65	0.6	4.06
6	"What a Disaster!"	October 24, 2022	0.3	2.22	0.2	1.54	0.6	3.76
7	"O Ye Of Little Faith"	October 31, 2022	0.3	2.33	0.2	1.48	0.5	3.81
8	"Stand by Ben"	November 7, 2022	0.4	2.65	0.2	1.56	0.6	4.21
9	"Fellow Travelers"	January 2, 2023	0.3	2.31	0.3	1.47	0.6	3.77
10	"Paging Dr. Song"	January 9, 2023	0.3	1.75	0.3	1.66	0.5	3.42
11	"Leap. Die. Repeat."	January 30, 2023	0.3	2.10	—N/a	—N/a	—N/a	—N/a
12	"Let Them Play"	February 6, 2023	0.3	1.75	—N/a	—N/a	—N/a	—N/a
13	"Family Style"	February 27, 2023	0.4	2.02	—N/a	—N/a	—N/a	—N/a
14	"S.O.S."	March 6, 2023	0.3	2.19	—N/a	—N/a	—N/a	—N/a
15	"Ben Song for the Defense"	March 13, 2023	0.4	2.28	—N/a	—N/a	—N/a	—N/a
16	"Ben, Interrupted"	March 20, 2023	0.3	1.92	—N/a	—N/a	—N/a	—N/a
17	"The Friendly Skies"	March 27, 2023	0.3	2.25	—N/a	—N/a	—N/a	—N/a
18	"Judgment Day"	April 3, 2023	0.3	2.16	—N/a	—N/a	—N/a	—N/a

==== Season 2 ====
Viewership and ratings per episode of Quantum Leap
No.	Title	Air date	Rating (18–49)	Viewers (millions)
1	"This Took Too Long!"	October 4, 2023	0.3	2.90
2	"Ben & Teller"	October 11, 2023	0.3	2.62
3	"Closure Encounters"	October 18, 2023	0.3	2.75
4	"The Lonely Hearts Club"	October 25, 2023	0.3	2.52
5	"One Night in Koreatown"	November 1, 2023	0.3	3.00
6	"Secret History"	November 15, 2023	0.3	3.00
7	"A Kind of Magic"	December 6, 2023	0.3	2.53
8	"Nomad"	December 13, 2023	0.3	2.76
9	"Off the Cuff"	January 30, 2024	0.2	1.70
10	"The Family Treasure"	February 6, 2024	0.2	1.58
11	"The Outsider"	February 13, 2024	0.2	1.34
12	"As the World Burns"	February 20, 2024	0.2	1.38
13	"Against Time"	February 20, 2024	0.2	1.36

=== Accolades ===
Award	Date(s) of ceremony	Category	Recipient(s)	Result	Ref.
3rd Astra TV Awards	January 8, 2024	Best Broadcast Network Series: Drama	Quantum Leap	Nominated	
3rd Astra TV Awards	January 8, 2024	Best Writing in a Broadcast Network or Cable Series: Drama	Shakina Nayfack for "Let Them Play"	Nominated	
3rd Astra TV Awards	January 8, 2024	Best Actor in a Broadcast Network or Cable Series: Drama	Raymond Lee	Nominated	
51st Saturn Awards	February 4, 2024	Best Action/Adventure/Thriller Television Series	Quantum Leap	Nominated	
51st Saturn Awards	February 4, 2024	Best Television Home Media Release	Quantum Leap (season 1)	Nominated	
51st Saturn Awards	February 4, 2024	Best Supporting Actor in a Television Series	Ernie Hudson	Nominated	
4th Astra TV Awards	August 18, 2024	Best Supporting Actor in a Broadcast Network or Cable Drama Series	Ernie Hudson	Won	

== Home media ==
The first season was released on DVD and Blu-ray in the United States on June 13, 2023. The second season was released on DVD and Blu-Ray in the United States on February 4, 2025. The Complete Series was released the same day.

Season	No. of episodes	DVD Release dates		
Season	No. of episodes	Region 1	Region 2	Region 4
1	18	June 13, 2023	September 25, 2023	TBA
