= Thor Freudenthal =

German film director

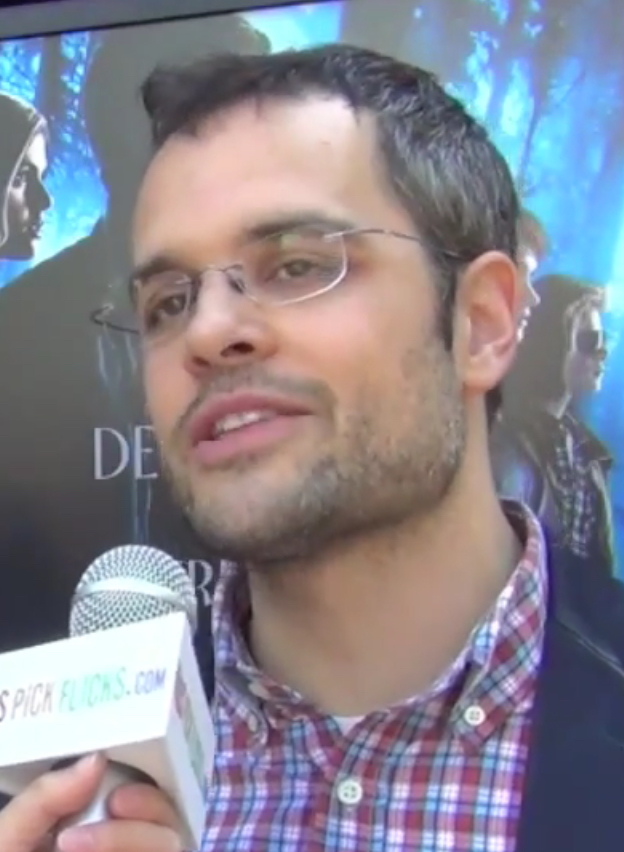
- Freudenthal in 2013
- Born: Germany
- Occupations: Film director, animator, special effect artist
- Years active: 1994–present
- Notable work: Hotel for Dogs; Diary of a Wimpy Kid; Percy Jackson: Sea of Monsters

Thor Freudenthal (/ˈtɔːr/) is a German film director, former animator and special effects artist best known for his work on Diary of a Wimpy Kid and Percy Jackson: Sea of Monsters.

== Life and career ==
Freudenthal was raised in Berlin, Germany. His parents were born in Israel of both Polish-Jewish origins. He credits his early interest in cinema to Steven Spielberg, saying "When my mother told me he's Jewish, and he goes to synagogue, it was like, 'My God, we're of the same tribe, and he's a huge hero of mine.' And then seeing the Schindler movie actually made me feel more secure in who I was myself." His family's connection to Spielberg became real when his Jewish grandparents, survivors of the Holocaust who had known Schindler personally, were asked to appear in the final scene of the movie.

Freudenthal attended the Hochschule der Künste Berlin, and later moved to Southern California as an exchange student at CalArts. He started out as an animation director, and found success as a director in his first live-action film, Motel, which played at Sundance Film Festival in 2005. He also worked on conceptal/visual art work at Sony Pictures Imageworks on films like Stuart Little, The ChubbChubbs! and Stuart Little 2. He later worked as second unit director on Disney's The Haunted Mansion. In 2009, he directed Hotel for Dogs for DreamWorks Pictures. He directed the live-action/animated feature film, Diary of a Wimpy Kid, based on the book by Jeff Kinney and in 2013 he directed Percy Jackson: Sea of Monsters.

In 2019, he was reported to have signed on to direct a film adaptation of the novel Skywatchers for Gotham Group. In 2020, he directed Words on Bathroom Walls, a drama film starring Charlie Plummer and Taylor Russell, about a teenager struggling with schizophrenia; the film was well-reviewed. In 2026, Freudenthal was announced to direct a film adaptation of the novel Lottery for Searchlight Pictures.

Freudenthal has also directed multiple episodes of Arrow and one episode of The Flash.

== Filmography ==
=== Film ===
Year	Film	Notes
2009	Hotel for Dogs	
2010	Diary of a Wimpy Kid	Also storyboard artist
2013	Percy Jackson: Sea of Monsters	
2020	Words on Bathroom Walls	Also producer

=== Television ===
Year	Title	Episode(s)
2011	Aim High	"Pilot"; Episodes #1.2 – #1.6
2014	Arrow	"The Climb" "Al Sah-Him" "Green Arrow" "Legends of Yesterday"
2015	The Flash	"Out of Time"
2015	Supergirl	"How Does She Do It?"
2015	Quantico	"Inside"
2016	Legends of Tomorrow	"The Magnificent Eight"
2016	The Death of Eva Sofia Valdez	
2017	The Expanse	"Caliban's War" "Assured Destruction" "Reload"
2018	The Tick	"Tale From the Crypt" "The End of the Beginning (Or the Start of the Dawn of the Age of Superhero)"
2019	Carnival Row	"Some Dark God Wakes" "Aisling" "The Joining of Unlike Things" "Fight and Flight" "New Dawn"
2021	La Brea	"Pilot" "The New Arrival" "The Storm" "Father and Son"
2022	Quantum Leap	"July 13th, 1985"
2023	Therapy	"Pilot" "Zweikel" "66"
2025	The Hunting Party	"Richard Harris" "Jenna Wells" "Ron Simms" "Adrian Gallo" "Xander Wax"
2025	The Bondsman	"Marphos" "Erdos"

=== Short films ===
Year	Film	Director	Writer
1996	Monkey Business	Yes	Yes
1997	Tattoos	Yes	Yes
1998	The Tenor	Yes	Yes
1998	Mind the Gap	Yes	Yes
2005	Motel	Yes	Yes
2007	Zéro Deux	Yes	Yes
2015	Another Day	No	Yes
2016	Starman	Yes	No

=== Other credits ===
Year	Film	Notes
1999	Stuart Little	Creative and visual effects development
2002	The ChubbChubbs!	Character designer, storyboard artist
2002	Stuart Little 2	Conceptual artist
2003	The Haunted Mansion	Second unit director
2009	The Movie Loft	Self (8 June 2009 and 12 May 2009)
2009	A Home for Everyone: The Making of 'Hotel for Dogs'	Self (video documentary short)
2009	Hotel for Dogs: K-9 Casting	Self (video documentary short)
2009	Hotel for Dogs: That's the Coolest Thing I've Ever Seen!	Self (video documentary short)
2010	Feed the Fish	Book illustrator
2013	Made in Hollywood	Self (episode #8.38)
