= King Jack =

- Directed by: Felix Thompson
- Written by: Felix Thompson
- Produced by: Dominic Buchanan; Gabrielle Nadig
- Starring: Charlie Plummer; Cory Nichols; Christian Madsen; Daniel Flaherty; Erin Davie; Chloe Levine
- Cinematography: Brandon Roots
- Edited by: Paul Penczner
- Music by: Bryan Senti
- Production company: Whitewater Films
- Distributed by: Well Go USA Entertainment
- Release dates: April 17, 2015 (Tribeca); February 26, 2016 (United Kingdom)
- Running time: 80 minutes
- Country: United States
- Language: English

King Jack is a 2015 American coming-of-age adventure drama film written and directed by Felix Thompson in his directorial debut. The film stars Charlie Plummer, Cory Nichols, Christian Madsen, Daniel Flaherty, Erin Davie and Chloe Levine, and follows a 15-year-old boy who befriends his introverted cousin while facing off against a sadistic school bully.

== Plot ==
Jack, a scrappy 15-year-old boy, bonds with his introverted cousin while facing off against a bully.

== Cast ==
- Charlie Plummer as Jack
- Cory Nichols as Ben
- Christian Madsen as Tom
- Daniel Flaherty as Shane
- Erin Davie as Karen
- Chloe Levine as Holly
- Yainis Ynoa as Harriet
- Melvin Mogoli as Beavan
- Keith Leonard as Officer Pete
- Francis Piscopo as Eric

== Release ==
The film premiered at the Tribeca Film Festival on April 17, 2015.

== Reception ==
On the review aggregator website Rotten Tomatoes, 94% of 34 critics' reviews are positive. The website's consensus reads: "Hard-hitting and honest yet sensitive, King Jack is an uncommonly affecting coming-of-age drama and a powerful calling card for debuting writer-director Felix Thompson." Metacritic, which uses a weighted average, assigned the film a score of 72 out of 100, based on 17 critics, indicating "generally favorable" reviews.

In the Los Angeles Times, Michael Rechtsaffen wrote that "thanks to a strongly rooted lead performance by Charlie Plummer as a 15-year-old small-town kid who's well on his way to a stint in juvenile detention, "King Jack" still strikes a resonant chord." On IndieWire, David Ehrlich wrote that "writer-director Felix Thompson's first film is a sensitive and self-possessed debut that clocks in at 76 minutes and doesn't waste a single one of them"
