= Gully (film) =

- Theatrical release poster
- Directed by: Nabil Elderkin
- Written by: Marcus J. Guillory
- Produced by: Tom Butterfield; Brad Feinstein; James Shani; Alex Georgiou; Ben Pugh; Corey Smyth
- Starring: Kelvin Harrison Jr.; Charlie Plummer; Jacob Latimore; Jonathan Majors; John Corbett; Amber Heard; Terrence Howard
- Cinematography: Adriano Goldman
- Edited by: Damion Clayton
- Music by: Dan Heath
- Production companies: Vertical Entertainment; Romulus Entertainment
- Distributed by: Paramount Pictures
- Release dates: April 27, 2019 (Tribeca); June 4, 2021 (United States)
- Running time: 90 minutes
- Country: United States
- Language: English

Gully is a 2019 American coming-of-age crime drama film directed by Nabil Elderkin, from a screenplay by Marcus J. Guillory. The film stars Kelvin Harrison Jr., Charlie Plummer, Jacob Latimore, Jonathan Majors, John Corbett, Amber Heard, and Terrence Howard.

Gully had its world premiere at the Tribeca Film Festival on April 27, 2019, and was released internationally on June 4, 2021, by Paramount Pictures.

== Plot ==
Set in an impoverished area of LA, Jesse, Calvin, and Nicky are lifelong friends. Each of them has experienced trauma and abuse from a young age.

Jesse is mute, due to abuse from his stepfather. Nicky may soon become a father, although Keisha's family is opposed to his white trash self. Calvin is self-destructive and opposed to taking his meds. The school guidance counselor tries to convince Calvin to apply himself, as his high scores show he could go on to college, but he says he's damned.

After Keisha's mother chases him off, the frustrated Nicky stomps off. He has a flashback to being a child witnessing Nicky Sr. severely beat someone on their front lawn. Nicky himself beats on a kid doing graffiti near a graffiti portrait of his deceased father.

Greg has been recently released from prison but finds it hard to adjust and get work. He pushes a lawnmower through the neighborhood, hoping to earn cash mowing lawns. An old acquaintance offers him some shady work but he turns it down to stay clean.

Recent revelations push the teens into taking their violent video game personas to the streets to engage in acts of real brutality. It was Calvin's idea to “take the game outside.” First, they trash a video store by knocking the DVDs off their shelves.

They randomly attack two guys, beat them up, and steal their pills and pickup. In their minds, they are racking up points as if it were a video game. Later, Greg goes to Jesse's to ask if his stepfather wants the grass cut, inadvertently sees Charlie push the teen's head in his lap, and hurries off to tell Calvin.

Calvin and Nicky rush to Jesse to support him as now they understand why he hasn't spoken for so many years. They stay the night to comfort him. The next day, out cruising in the pickup, a Mercedes owner drives aggressively towards Calvin. He has a flashback to when his dad was gunned down by a cop for being too assertive. Calvin follows the car, and the trio busts into the house, breaking things and trading the pickup for the Mercedes. They again see it as a video game upgrade.

They pick up random tourists to mess with them, with Jesse pretending to be a famous artist fresh out of the recording studio. After taking them to a club, Nicky and Jesse are fooling around in the car with the girls. Calvin brings the guy to them, knocks him down and they head for home on foot.

The next day, after Calvin's skateboard is broken by a car which narrowly misses him, he seems to have snapped. Calvin buries the skateboard, and then sits in an almost catatonic state. His mother, in an effort to reach him, gives him a cape as an early birthday present. Climbing up some scaffolding, Greg finds him, so climbs up next to him. Calvin reiterates his dream to fly to Venus, he also references the 'cool' violent incident that landed Greg in jail which the trio of friends had witnessed.

Charlie turns up to leave Jesse groceries, but before Nicky can reach Calvin he's left. Nicky and Calvin hunt him down at his house. Finding him with a whole family, Calvin sodomizes him repeatedly with a wine bottle, which breaks, and then Nicky finishes him off with a bullet.

Nicky accidentally left his mobile in the Mercedes, so the police nab him for grand theft. After Calvin and Jesse visit him in jail, Jesse goes into a convenience store for a beer while Calvin gets gunned down by the guys whose pickup they'd robbed.

The next day, Jesse brings Calvin's hoodie to his mother, who realises he's met his demise, and she weeps uncontrollably. Greg's mother breaks the news to him. He seeks out Jesse, and he drives them to the beach. There, Jesse ends his decade-old silence with a loud scream of anguish.

== Cast ==
- Kelvin Harrison Jr. as Jesse
- Charlie Plummer as Nicky
- Jacob Latimore as Calvin
- Jonathan Majors as Greg
- Amber Heard as Joyce
- Terrence Howard as Mr. Christmas
- Zoe Renee as Keisha
- Chastity Dotson as Angela
- Chris Gann as Barett
- Kashton Moore as Terry
- John Corbett as Charlie
- Mo McRae as Otis

Additionally, Travis Scott makes a cameo appearance in the film.

== Production ==
In March 2018, it was announced Charlie Plummer, Kelvin Harrison Jr., Jacob Latimore, Alice Eve and Jonathan Majors had joined the cast of the film, with Nabil Elderkin directing from a screenplay by Marcus J. Guillory. Brad Feinstein, Tom Butterfield, Ben Pugh, Corey Smyth, and Alex Georgiou will produce the film, while Joseph F. Ingrassia, Gabriela Revilla Lugo, Andy Brunskill, Kweku Mandela and Mattia Bogianchino will executive produce the film, under Feinstein's Romulus Entertainment banner. That same month, Amber Heard joined the cast of the film.

=== Filming ===
Principal photography began in March 2018.

== Soundtrack ==
Gully (Original Motion Picture Soundtrack)

Soundtrack album by Various Artists
- Released: June 4, 2021
- Genre: Hip-hop
- Label: Epic Records; Sony Music Entertainment
- Producer: Various

Gully (Original Motion Picture Soundtrack) is the soundtrack to the 2019 film Gully that was released on June 4, 2021, by Epic Records and Sony Music Entertainment. The album contains performances by 21 Savage, Ty Dolla $ign, ScHoolboy Q, B-Real, Don Toliver, Miguel, Snoh Aalegra, Gary Clark Jr., Sleepy Rose, Mike Will Made-It, 2 Chainz, and Dua Lipa. A song by Travis Scott titled "Knife" was originally meant to appear on the soundtrack but was cut due to sampling issues, however, a snippet of the song is played during the film.

=== Track listing ===
No.	Title	Length
1.	"Betrayed" (performed by 21 Savage)	3:12
2.	"Blacks N Mexicans" (performed by Ty Dolla $ign, ScHoolboy Q and B-Real)	2:46
3.	"Won't Stop" (performed by Don Toliver)	2:51
4.	"Violent Dreams" (performed by Miguel)	3:27
5.	"Murderer" (performed by Buddy)	2:39
6.	"Troubled Waters" (performed by Snoh Aalegra)	3:01
7.	"We Stay Up" (performed by Gary Clark Jr.)	3:44
8.	"Posed To Be" (performed by Sleepy Rose, Mike Will Made-It, and 2 Chainz)	2:47
9.	"Can They Hear Us" (performed by Dua Lipa)	3:50
Total length:		26.17

== Release ==
The film had its world premiere at the Tribeca Film Festival on April 27, 2019. In September 2020, Vertical Entertainment and Paramount Pictures acquired U.S. distribution rights to the film.

On May 21, 2021, Paramount Pictures released a trailer for the film. It was released internationally on June 4, 2021.

== Reception ==
On the review aggregator website Rotten Tomatoes, 25% of 28 critics' reviews are positive.
