= A Perfect Day for Caribou =

- Directed by: Jeff Rutherford
- Written by: Jeff Rutherford
- Music by: Marisa Anderson
- Production company: Fred Senior Films
- Release dates: August 2022 (Locarno); April 2, 2024
- Running time: 95 minutes
- Country: United States
- Language: English

A Perfect Day for Caribou is an experimental drama film directed by Jeff Rutherford that had its premiere at 2022 Locarno Film Festival. It was released by Freestyle Digital Media on North American VOD Platforms and DVD on April 2, 2024. Starring Charlie Plummer and Jeb Berrier, it follows the routine of a father (Berrier) and his estranged son (Plummer) over the course of a day in the late 1990s.

== Cast ==
- Charlie Plummer as Nate
- Jeb Berrier as Herman

== Reception ==
The film received mostly positive reviews from critics with praise for its black and white cinematography, narrative and direction. In his review in Variety, Guy Lodge said that "fine performances by Charlie Plummer and Jeb Berrier anchor Jeff Rutherford's modest but refined debut feature about estranged men bound by malaise." Matthew Joseph Jenner of the International Cinephile Society wrote that the film was "a profound meditation on what it means to be a man, whether it be reflecting on the past, acknowledging the present, or anticipating the future."
