= Words on Bathroom Walls =

2020 film by Thor Freudenthal

- Theatrical release poster
- Directed by: Thor Freudenthal
- Screenplay by: Nick Naveda
- Based on: Words on Bathroom Walls by Julia Walton
- Produced by: Pete Shilaimon; Mickey Liddell; Thor Freudenthal
- Starring: Charlie Plummer; Andy García; Taylor Russell; AnnaSophia Robb; Beth Grant; Molly Parker; Walton Goggins
- Cinematography: Michael Goi
- Edited by: Peter McNulty
- Music by: Alex Pall and Drew Taggart; Andrew Hollander
- Production company: LD Entertainment
- Distributed by: Roadside Attractions; LD Entertainment
- Release date: August 21, 2020 (United States)
- Running time: 111 minutes
- Country: United States
- Language: English
- Budget: $9.3 million
- Box office: $3.1 million

Words on Bathroom Walls is a 2020 American coming-of-age romantic drama film directed by Thor Freudenthal and written by Nick Naveda, based on the novel of the same name by Julia Walton. The film stars Charlie Plummer, Andy García, Taylor Russell, AnnaSophia Robb, Beth Grant, Molly Parker and Walton Goggins.

Words on Bathroom Walls was released on August 21, 2020, by Roadside Attractions and LD Entertainment.

== Plot ==
After a psychotic break causes him to accidentally burn a classmate's arm, high school senior Adam Petrazelli is diagnosed with schizophrenia. He first self-treats by intensely focusing on cooking, which calms him. His symptoms – chiefly hallucinations of three people – worsen until he is put on a drug trial. At stressful times, his three regular "visitors" are Rebecca, a New Age hippie; Joaquin, the smutty best friend; and the overprotective and often violent "The Bodyguard"; as well as a "dark" threatening voice that represents Adam's fears of the unknown.

Adam transfers to St. Agatha's Catholic School and meets Maya Arnaz, a class valedictorian. Adam gets Maya to tutor him and finds that she helps him feel better, so he takes his new medication regularly. This reduces his hallucinations, with only the side effect being muscle twitching. Adam and Maya become close, but he does not disclose his condition to her out of fear of stigmatization.

When Maya does not show up to a tutoring session, Adam visits her home. He discovers that her family is struggling financially, and she is embarrassed and angry about his unannounced visit. After realizing that he does not care about her background, Maya continues tutoring him. She invites him to her restaurant job where she has him cook for her, but a taste test leads Adam to the realization that his medication is negatively affecting his taste buds.

Adam decides to stop taking his medications, unbeknownst to his mother Beth and stepfather Paul. His moods become imbalanced and his delusions return. The news that Beth is expecting a new baby with Paul also gives rise to Adam's insecurities about being unwanted and feeling like a burden. Nevertheless, Adam's grades improve and his essay is selected to be read at graduation. He asks Maya to the prom and she accepts.

Beth finds out that Adam has stopped his medication and confronts him. Sister Catherine, the school's headmistress, learns about the incident and about what happened at his last school. He is temporarily suspended, with the reasoning that it is for the students' safety. Adam lashes out at Paul, believing that an email Paul wrote to Catherine the previous night is behind the suspension.

The suspension bars Adam from attending the prom, but he goes anyway. Before leaving, he takes an overdose of his medication, believing that it will help the night go smoothly. He meets Maya there, but as they dance, the dark voice plagues him and he begins to act erratically. Catherine tries to kick him out, but his delusions cause him to push her to the ground, run to the catwalk, and fall over the edge.

Adam wakes in the hospital to see Beth and Paul. Maya shows up to visit, but he breaks down when hallucinations overwhelm him. He yells at Maya, telling her to leave. He is expelled from St. Agatha's and placed in a psych ward. Beth brings Adam a printed copy of the email Paul sent to St. Agatha's. Contrary to what Adam thought, Paul supported Adam and wrote that suspending him would be cruel. Realizing how much Paul cares, Adam runs to catch up with him and Beth, hugging Paul for the first time.

Beth and Paul take Adam to St. Agatha's graduation ceremony, where, despite Catherine's attempt to stop him, he gathers the courage to address the student body calmly, with the support of Rev. Patrick, a sympathetic school priest. He quotes his essay in which he discusses both his condition and battle with schizophrenia, saying that he wished he had not hidden his illness. After he leaves the auditorium, Maya runs after him. Adam apologizes for not mentioning his illness. They then express their mutual love and kiss.

Adam manages to receive his high school diploma and realizes his dream of attending culinary school. He later celebrates the birth of his baby sister with his parents and Maya. The voices are still present, but he has learned to live alongside them.

== Cast ==
- Charlie Plummer as Adam Petrazelli
- Taylor Russell as Maya Arnaz
- Andy García as Father Patrick
- AnnaSophia Robb as Rebecca
- Beth Grant as Sister Catherine
- Devon Bostick as Joaquin
- Lobo Sebastian as The Bodyguard
- Molly Parker as Beth Petrazelli
- Walton Goggins as Paul

== Production ==
In February 2018, Thor Freudenthal was announced as the film's director, from a screenplay by Nick Naveda, based on the novel of the same name by Julia Walton, with LD Entertainment producing. Freudenthal read and enjoyed the novel, and felt that a film adaptation would allow the "opportunity for a very different kind of representation of mental illness with schizophrenia. We could create a person onscreen that was neither a mad genius nor a violent criminal, [but] who a lot of people could even see themselves in the way I did when I read the book. I loved that there was a sort of tender, compassionate, funny tone where Adam gets at some of the really tough issues with self-deprecating humor which really functions as a weapon of sorts against his pain."

In March 2018, Charlie Plummer and Taylor Russell were set to star in the film. In April 2018, Andy García, Molly Parker, Walton Goggins, AnnaSophia Robb, and Devon Bostick also joined the cast. Andrew Hollander and The Chainsmokers composed the film's score, the first time the band has scored a film. The trailer features The Chainsmokers' 2019 single "Push My Luck".

Principal photography began in May 2018. The film was shot in Wilmington, North Carolina.

== Release ==
In June 2020, Roadside Attractions and LD Entertainment acquired distribution rights to the film and set it for an August 7, 2020, release. The film was released to theaters on August 21, 2020.

== Reception ==
=== Box office ===
Opening as one of the first new films in wide release during the COVID-19 pandemic, on August 21, 2020, the film made $462,050 from 925 theaters in its first weekend (an average of $499 per venue), finishing third at the box office. 54% of the audience was female, with 62% being between the ages 18–34. The film expanded to 1,395 theaters in its second weekend, and grossed $453,000, then made $282,000 from 1,168 theaters in its third.

=== Critical response ===
On the review aggregator website Rotten Tomatoes, the film holds an approval rating of 89% based on 89 reviews, with an average of 7.2/10. The site's critics consensus reads, "Sensitive, well-acted, and solidly directed, Words on Bathroom Walls is an admirable addition to a genre that too rarely does justice to its worthy themes." Metacritic, which uses a weighted average, assigned the film a score of 61 out of 100, based on 12 critics, indicating "generally favorable" reviews. Audiences polled by CinemaScore gave the film an average grade of "A" on an A+ to F scale, while PostTrak reported 81% of filmgoers gave it a positive score.

Words on Bathroom Walls received praise for its performances, writing, and direction. Guy Lodge of Variety wrote, "There are pockets of truth, grace and pain in this portrait of troubled adolescence, and its talented young stars know where to find them". Writing for AllMovie, Steven Yoder wrote, "Freudenthal understands the workings of the adolescent mind better than any director since John Hughes, and it shows through the ease of the actors' portrayals." He added, "The script is tight, showing the progression of wellness, illness, hope, and setback without ever becoming preachy, instructional, or boring. It gives an accurate view of mental illness without being pushy about acceptance. Instead, it displays how not only someone with the illness must cope, but the varied ways that those around them react and cope as well. Nothing ever seems forced, and the action is fluid from the first moments to the closing credits."

Judith Lawrence of The Michigan Daily called the film "refreshing in its empathetic representation of schizophrenia", writing: "Neither Adam nor schizophrenia is ever demonized, a rare find in the film industry. M. Night Shyamalan's Split, for example, was heavily criticized for its portrayal of dissociative identity disorder. This is not a singular example — mental illnesses are often vilified and used as plot devices in horror films. Part of the goal in Words on Bathroom Walls, though, is to show schizophrenia (and mental illness in general) as something that real people are constantly living with and battling."

Nick Naveda received a nomination for the Best Adapted Screenplay Award from the Chlotrudis Society for Independent Films.

== Soundtrack ==
The Words on Bathroom Walls soundtrack album, including the soundtrack and score, was produced by Andrew Hollander featuring the Chainsmokers, and released on August 21, 2020.
