= Erin Davie =

American actress and singer

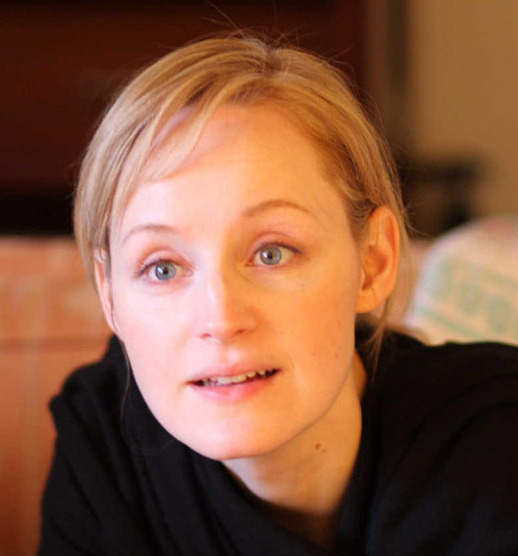
- Davie in 2008
- Born: June 18, 1977 (age 49); Nashville, Tennessee, U.S.
- Education: Boston Conservatory (BFA)
- Occupations: Singer, actress
- Years active: 2006–present

Erin Davie (born June 18, 1977) is an American actress and singer, best known for her performance as the young Edith Bouvier Beale in the musical Grey Gardens, taking the part on Broadway at the Walter Kerr Theatre in 2006, after its initial run Off-Broadway at Playwrights Horizons.

== Career ==
=== Early life ===
Davie was born in Nashville, Tennessee, and attended the Boston Conservatory, where she received her BFA in musical theater.

=== Stage ===
Davie appeared on the national tours for Swing! and The Music of Andrew Lloyd Webber, as well as the Off-Broadway production, Infertility.

Davie made her Broadway debut in the musical Grey Gardens, which opened at the Walter Kerr Theatre in November 2006. She played the character of the young Edie Beale. In 2007, she won a Theater World Award for her performance in Grey Gardens.

In 2007 she played the character Isabella Andreini in the Lincoln Center Theater's production of The Glorious Ones. On February 7–10, 2007 she appeared in the role of Eve Harrington in the New York City Center Encores! staged concert production of Applause. On February 15, 2008 she took over the role of Niki Harris in the Broadway production of Curtains.

In 2009 she played Countess Charlotte Malcolm in the Broadway revival of the Stephen Sondheim musical A Little Night Music, at the Walter Kerr Theatre.

In regional theatre, Davie performed in the World premiere of A Time to Kill at the Arena Stage in Washington, D.C. in May–June 2011.

She played the role of Violet in the revised version of the musical Side Show, which ran at the La Jolla Playhouse in November and December 2013 and played at the Kennedy Center in June through July 2014. In November 2014, the production transferred to Broadway, with Davie reprising her role. It closed on January 4, 2015. Davie has since appeared with some of the cast in several reunion concerts at 54 Below in New York City.

She appeared in the Broadway revival of Sunday in the Park With George as Yvonne/Naomi. The musical opened at the Hudson Theatre on February 11, 2017 in previews, officially on February 23 and closed on April 23, directed by Sarna Lapine.

In 2019, Davie portrayed Camilla Parker Bowles in the world premiere of Diana at the La Jolla Playhouse, and reprised the role for the Broadway production in 2020. The production began previews on March 2, 2020, and was slated to open on March 31, but was suspended on March 12 due to the COVID-19 pandemic. The production was eventually remounted on November 17, 2021 and closed on December 19, 2021. The Broadway production was captured on film in the summer of 2020, and released on Netflix on October 1, 2021. For her performance, Davie was nominated for a Golden Raspberry Award for Worst Supporting Actress.

Davie will portray Francesca Johnson in Signature Theatre's production of The Bridges of Madison County August–September 2023 in Arlington, VA.

== Filmography ==
- King Jack (2015)
- Easter Mysteries (2016)
- Run Hide Fight: Infidels (2026)
