= Chloë Levine =

American actress and filmmaker

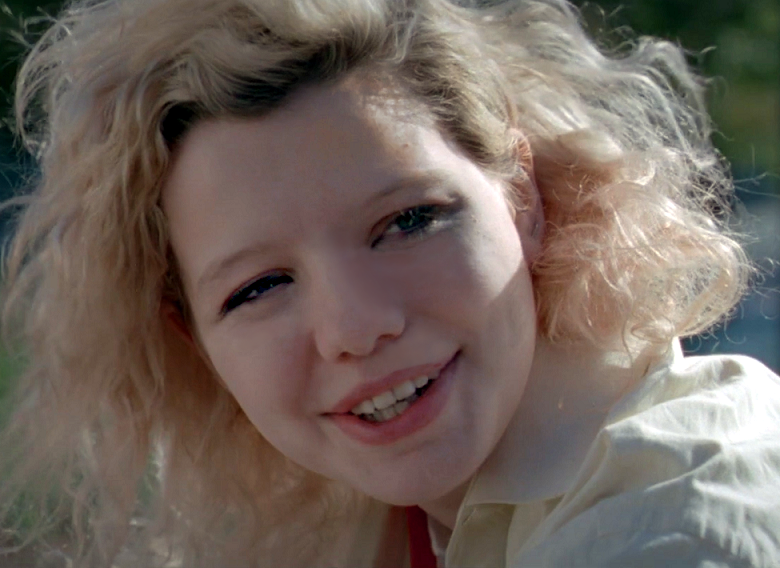
- Levine in the film KNIVES (2015)
- Born: New Jersey, U.S.
- Occupations: Actress; filmmaker
- Years active: 2002–present

Chloë Levine is an American actress and filmmaker. Levine has appeared in as well as directed numerous films, both short and feature-length. Her most notable appearances include Innocence (2013), The Transfiguration (2016), The Defenders (2017), The Ranger (2018), Antarctica (2020), and on television in The OA (2016–2019), and Trinkets in 2020.

== Personal life and career ==
Levine is from northern New Jersey, and moved to New York City at age 14. Her mother, and her sister, who is 8 years older, are also both actresses.

She starred as Sunday Wilson in the Hilary Brougher directed thriller Innocence in 2013.

In 2015, Levine starred as Holly in the Felix Thompson directed film King Jack, alongside Charlie Plummer, which premiered at the Tribeca Festival. The film went on to win the 2015 Tribeca Audience Award for Best film Narrative.

In 2017, Levine appeared as Lexi in the Marvel Studios miniseries The Defenders in a cast which included Krysten Ritter and Sigourney Weaver. The same year, she starred in The Deuce, alongside James Franco and Maggie Gyllenhaal.

In 2018, she starred as Chelsea in the punk inspired slasher film, The Ranger The same year, she was cast as the protagonist in the film Savage Youth. She also appeared in Ask for Jane as Barb

In 2020, Levine joined the season 2 cast of Trinkets in a recurring role as Jillian, Elodie's new love interest.

== Filmography ==
=== Film ===
Year	Title	Role	Notes	Ref(s)
2013	Innocence	Sunday Wilson		
2014	Dragon	Daughter		
2015	KNIVES	Devin		
2015	King Jack	Holly	Won 2015 Tribeca Audience Award for Best Narrative	
2016	The Transfiguration	Sophie		
2016	Good Bones	Hoonie		
2017	Sugar!	Claudia		
2018	Savage Youth	Stephanie		
2018	The Ranger	Chelsea		
2018	No Alternative	Jackie O'Brien		
2018	Ask for Jane	Barb		
2019	Adam	June		
2019	Depraved	Lucy		
2020	Antarctica	Kat		
2021	Blue Bison	Key	Short film	
2023	The Sacrifice Game	Rose		
2024	Somnium	Gemma		

=== Television ===
Year	Title	Role	Notes	Ref(s)
2002	Third Watch	Shannon	Episode: "Unleashed"	
2015	The Mysteries of Laura	Ally Davis	Episode: "The Mystery of the Deemed Dealer"	
2016–2019	The OA	Angie	Recurring role (season 1); main role (season 2) - 6 episodes	
2017	The Defenders	Lexi Raymond	Miniseries	
2017	The Deuce	Veronica	Episode: Pilot	
2017	Mr. Robot	Erica	Episode: "eps3.3_m3tadata.par2"	
2018	Bull	Jemma Whitbeck	Episode: "Survival Instincts"	
2018	High Maintenance	Ella	Episode: "HBD"	
2019	The Society	Emily	Episode: "What Happened"	
2020	Trinkets	Jillian	Recurring role (season 2) - 7 episodes	
