= Antarctica (2020 film) =

- Directed by: Keith Bearden
- Written by: Keith Bearden
- Produced by: Peter Ernsky; Kim Jackson
- Starring: Chloe Levine; Kimie Muroya
- Cinematography: Madeline Kate Kann
- Edited by: Meagan Costello; Khushnuda Shukurova
- Music by: Andrew Hollander
- Production company: Greasy Films
- Distributed by: Breaker Studios
- Release date: December 4, 2020
- Running time: 80 minutes
- Country: United States
- Language: English

Antarctica is a 2020 American romantic comedy film written and directed by Keith Bearden and starring Chloe Levine and Kimie Muroya.

== Plot ==
Kat and Janet are lifelong friends confronting the pressures of adulthood during their senior year of high school in a small town. Janet, on a mood-altering medication, hallucinates and meets a boy who claims he's from the future. Meanwhile, Kat is navigating rumors spreading about her being pregnant following a hookup, and the two are forced to grapple with their circumstances when the rumor become reality.

== Cast ==
- Chloe Levine as Kat
- Kimie Muroya as Janet
- Steve Lipman as Stevie D
- Damian Young as Dr. Blake
- Bubba Weiler as Rian
- Clea Lewis as Diane
- Laith Nakli as Vlad
- Ajay Naidu as Principal Pepp
- Jojo Gonzalez as Jaime Jimenez

== Release ==
The film was released on December 4, 2020.

== Reception ==
The film has an 86% rating on Rotten Tomatoes based on seven reviews.

John DeFore of The Hollywood Reporter gave the film a positive review and wrote "...Keith Bearden’s take on a teen-comedy model that always lives or dies by its stars’ chemistry."

Bradley Gibson of Film Threat rated the film a 9 out of 10, calling it "a rare gem that stands as one of this year’s best."
