= The Ranger (film) =

2018 American slasher film

- Promotional release poster
- Directed by: Jenn Wexler
- Written by: Giaco Furino; Jenn Wexler
- Produced by: Heather Buckley; Larry Fessenden; Ashleigh Snead; Andrew van den Houten; Jenn Wexler
- Starring: Chloë Levine; Jeremy Holm; Amanda Grace Benitez; Granit Lahu; Jeremy Pope; Bubba Weiler
- Cinematography: James Siewert
- Edited by: Abbey Killheffer; Jenn Wexler
- Music by: Wade MacNeil; Andrew Gordon Macpherson
- Production company: Hood River Entertainment; Glass Eye Pix
- Distributed by: Shudder
- Release date: March 12, 2018 (SXSW)
- Running time: 77 minutes
- Country: United States
- Language: English

The Ranger is a 2018 American slasher film written and directed by Jenn Wexler. It stars Chloë Levine as a punk who flees with her friends from the law to hide out at her late uncle's cabin in a national forest, and Jeremy Holm as the titular park ranger who responds in an unhinged manner. Wexler has described the concept of the film as an attempt to "blend the genres of 80s punk movies with 80s slashers". The Ranger received mostly positive reviews from the critics, praised for its style and Wexler's direction.

== Plot summary ==
After Chelsea and her friends find themselves in trouble with the police, they decide to escape the city and go into hiding. Using a hallucinogenic drug called Echo, they plan to chill out in a secluded family cabin deep in the forest. However, their presence catches the attention of a disturbed park ranger who is determined to preserve the purity of the woods and views the group as a threat. The friends must now struggle to survive against a dangerous, obsessive authority figure.

== Cast ==
- Chloë Levine as Chelsea
  - Jeté Laurence as young Chelsea
- Jeremy Holm as The Ranger
- Amanda Grace Benitez as Amber
- Granit Lahu as Garth
- Jeremy Pope as Jerk
- Bubba Weiler as Abe
- Larry Fessenden as Uncle Pete
- Clay McLeod Chapman as Alley cop
- Jim Johnson as Cop
- Nicholas Tucci as Flesh

== Production ==
The film was based on an old, reworked script from Jenn Wexler's college friend Giaco Furino — they both majored in screenwriting. As the director noted, the original screenplay "was more of a straight up body count movie, with the same overall structure of punks going to the woods and a park ranger starting to take them out." The altered story was inspired by punk horror films such as The Return of the Living Dead (1985), as well as the Evil Dead franchise, Class of 1984 (1982), and Rituals (1977). Jeremy Holm, who was Furino's friend, was cast as The Ranger and was the first cast member attached to the project.

== Reception ==
The Ranger received mostly positive reviews from the critics. On the review aggregator website Rotten Tomatoes, the film holds a 76% approval rating on based on 37 reviews, with an average rating of 6.9/10. Consequence's Michael Roffman called the film "pulpy, sensational, stylish, and merciless", noting that "Jenn Wexler shows a ton of promise as a filmmaker, and may even have a potential muse in Chloë Levine." Antol Bitel of SciFiNow compared The Ranger to John Boorman's Deliverance, writing that it "resonates with hallucinatory flashbacks to cinema's past". ScreenAnarchy editor J Hurtado provided a positive review, calling the film a "fun throwback with a killer soundtrack and enough solid kills in its 77 minutes [...] to sate spiky haired gorehounds everywhere." Katie Rife from The A.V. Club gave the film a "B" score, calling it "a loving tribute to the counterculture tentpoles of punk rock and horror movies". Rife also opined that "Wexler has interpreted her influences thoughtfully and inverted them cleverly. It's the smart kind of dumb fun." Albert Nowicki of His Name is Death praised the film's visuals and setting, and wrote: "The world presented by Wexler is painted in sharp, vivid shades reminiscent of MTV's music video aesthetics from around forty years ago. Neon lighting contrasts with the raw, chilly landscape of the forest, which resembles the damp woods of the Evil Dead rather than the classic summer campgrounds of Friday the 13th. The cold, autumn wilderness is captured so convincingly, you can almost breathe it in."

=== Accolades ===
Award / Festival	Year of ceremony	Category	Recipient(s)	Result	Ref.
Boston Underground Film Festival	2018	Bacchus Award; Best First Feature	Jenn Wexler	Runner-up	
Fangoria Chainsaw Awards	2019	Best First Feature	Jenn Wexler	Nominated	
Fantaspoa International Fantastic Film Festival	2018	Best Soundtrack	Wade MacNeil, Andrew Gordon Macpherson	Won	
Fright Nights — Horrorant Film Festival	2018	Best Film	Jenn Wexler	Nominated	
L.A. Punk Film Festival	2019	Best Horror Film	Jenn Wexler	Won	
South by Southwest	2018	SXSW Gamechanger Award	Jenn Wexler	Nominated	

== See also ==
- List of punk films
