= Mason Alexander Park =

American actor (born 1995)

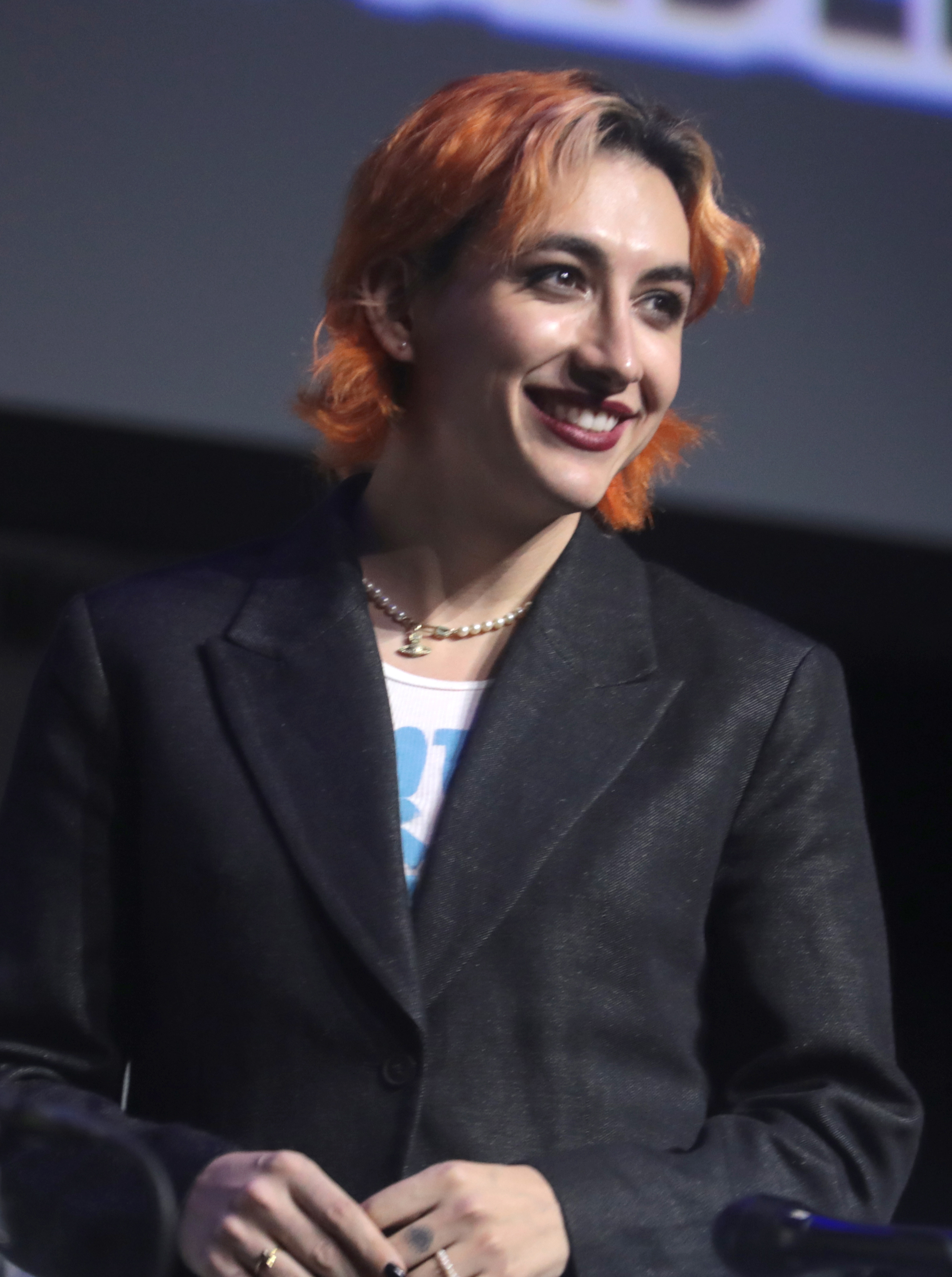
- Park at the 2023 WonderCon
- Born: July 12, 1995 (age 30); Fairfax, Virginia, U.S.
- Education: Point Park University (BA)
- Occupation: Actor
- Years active: 2010−present
- Website: masonalexanderpark.com

Mason Alexander Park (born July 12, 1995) is an American actor. They (Note: Park uses both they/them and she/her pronouns and switches between them; this article uses they/them for consistency.) began their career in regional theatre, winning a Helen Hayes Award. Park has since appeared on stage in London's West End. On television, Park is known for their roles in the Netflix adaptations of the anime Cowboy Bebop (2021) and comic The Sandman (2022–2025), and the Quantum Leap (2022–2024) revival on NBC. Their films include National Anthem (2023).

== Early life ==
Park was born in Fairfax, Virginia, and moved around as a child for their father's work before settling down in North Carolina. They are of Spanish and Mexican descent. Park discovered acting through a summer camp in Texas. In need of a new environment after being bullied at school, Park went to Los Angeles with their mother and enrolled at Grand Arts High School.

In 2012, Park was one of two actors from high schools in Los Angeles County to win the Jerry Herman High School Musical Theatre Awards of Los Angeles, for their role as Cornelius in Hello, Dolly!. They attended the Jimmy Awards in New York City as a finalist.

Park graduated in 2016 with a Bachelor of Arts in Musical Theatre from Point Park University in Pittsburgh.

== Career ==
Park began their career as a teenager, guest starring as Toby Peterson in a 2011 episode of the Nickelodeon series iCarly. They would reprise the role in the iCarly reboot in 2023.

In 2015 and 2016, Park worked with the Pittsburgh Civic Light Opera (CLO) on productions such as Mary Poppins and South Pacific at the Benedum Center, and Altar Boyz at the Greer Cabaret Theater. Park alternated the titular role of Hedwig on the 2017 US tour of Hedwig and the Angry Inch. They later returned to the role in 2021 at Olney Theatre Center. They played Dr. Frank N Furter in The Rocky Horror Show in 2018 at Bucks County Playhouse; Emcee in Cabaret at Olney Theatre Center in 2019, which won Park a Helen Hayes Award; and Charlotte in I Am My Own Wife at Long Wharf Theatre in 2020.

Park returned to television when they were cast as Gren in the Netflix live-action version of the anime Cowboy Bebop, which was released in 2021. That same year, they put on a solo show in New York titled The Pansy Craze. As of 2022, Park plays the androgynous entity Desire in The Sandman, a Netflix adaptation of Neil Gaiman's comics, as well as Ian Wright in the Quantum Leap revival on NBC.

Park made their West End debut when they once again played the Emcee in Cabaret at the Playhouse Theatre in 2023. They also starred as Ariel in Jamie Lloyd's production of Shakespeare's The Tempest alongside Sigourney Weaver at the Theatre Royal Drury Lane, London, from late 2024 to early 2025. In 2025 they played Margaret in Jamie Lloyd's production of Shakespeare's Much Ado About Nothing starring Tom Hiddleston and Hayley Atwell in London at the Theatre Royal Drury Lane, starting on February 10, 2025 and running through April 5, 2025.

== Personal life ==
On July 26, 2024, Park stated on X that they are part of the transgender community. Park is non-binary and goes by they/them and she/her pronouns.

== Acting credits ==
=== Film ===
Year	Title	Role	Notes
2015	Not in My Backyard	Student	
2019	Before You Know It	Fellow	
2023	National Anthem	Carrie	Nominated for an Independent Spirit Award

=== Television ===
Year	Title	Role	Notes
2010	Pizza & Karaoke		Television film
2011	iCarly	Toby Peterson	Episode: "iLove You"
2012	Broadway or Bust	Self	
2013	Bucket & Skinner's Epic Adventures	Toby	2 episodes
2020	Acting for a Cause	Various	
2021	Cowboy Bebop	Gren	5 episodes
2022	The Legend of Vox Machina	Tavern Keeper	Voice role
2022-2025	The Sandman	Desire	Main role
2022–2024	Quantum Leap	Ian Wright	Main role
2023	iCarly	Toby Peterson	Episode: "iReunited and It Felt OK"

=== Stage ===
Year	Title	Role	Notes
2015	Mary Poppins	Miss Andrew	Benedum Center, Pittsburgh CLO
2015	Altar Boyz	Mark	Greer Cabaret Theater, CLO
2015	Spring Awakening	Moritz	Greer Cabaret Theater
2016	South Pacific	Professor	Benedum Center, CLO
2017	Hedwig and the Angry Inch	Hedwig	US tour
2018	The Rocky Horror Show	Dr Frank N Furter	Bucks County Playhouse, New Hope
2019	Cabaret	The Emcee	Olney Theatre Center
2020	I Am My Own Wife	Charlotte von Mahlsdorf	Long Wharf Theatre, New Haven
2021	Hedwig and the Angry Inch	Hedwig	Olney Theatre Center
2021	The Pansy Craze	Solo Show	The Green Room 42, Chelsea Table + Stage, New York
2023	Cabaret	The Emcee	Playhouse Theatre, London, West End debut Nominated for Best Takeover Performance at 2024 WhatsOnStage Awards
2024	American Idiot	St. Jimmy	Deaf West Theatre, Los Angeles
2024	The Tempest	Ariel	Theatre Royal, Drury Lane, London
2025	Much Ado About Nothing	Margaret	Theatre Royal, Drury Lane, London
2025	Oh, Mary!	Mary Todd Lincoln	Trafalgar Theatre, London
2026	Much Ado About Nothing	Margaret	Winter Garden Theatre, New York City, Broadway debut

=== Web ===
Year	Title	Role	Notes
2017	TranspLAnts	Mas	

=== Audio ===
Year	Title	Role	Notes
2019	Loveville High	Jendrix	

== Awards and nominations ==
Year	Award	Category	Work	Result	Ref.
2020	Helen Hayes Awards	Outstanding Lead Performer in a Musical	Cabaret	Won	
2024	WhatsOnStage Awards	Best Takeover Performance	Cabaret	Nominated	
2025	Independent Spirit Awards	Best Breakthrough Performance	National Anthem	Nominated	
2026	WhatsOnStage Awards	Best Supporting Performer in a Play	Much Ado About Nothing	Nominated	
2026	Ian Charleson Awards		The Tempest	3rd	
