= Spontaneous (film) =

2020 comedy film directed by Brian Duffield

- Film poster
- Directed by: Brian Duffield
- Screenplay by: Brian Duffield
- Based on: Spontaneous by Aaron Starmer
- Produced by: Brian Duffield; Nicki Cortese; Matthew Kaplan; Jordan Levin
- Starring: Katherine Langford; Charlie Plummer; Hayley Law; Piper Perabo; Rob Huebel; Yvonne Orji
- Cinematography: Aaron Morton
- Edited by: Steve Edwards
- Music by: Joseph Trapanese
- Production companies: Awesomeness Films; Jurassic Party Productions
- Distributed by: Paramount Pictures
- Release date: October 2, 2020 (United States)
- Running time: 101 minutes
- Country: United States
- Language: English

Spontaneous is a 2020 American coming-of-age black comedy horror film, written, produced and directed by Brian Duffield, in his directorial debut. It stars Katherine Langford, Charlie Plummer, Hayley Law, Piper Perabo, Rob Huebel and Yvonne Orji and is based on the 2016 novel of the same name by Aaron Starmer.

It was released in a limited release on October 2, 2020, followed by video on demand on October 6, 2020, by Paramount Pictures. It received positive reviews from critics.

== Plot ==
During a senior calculus class at Covington High, senior student Katelyn Ogden inexplicably explodes, spraying the surrounding students and classroom with blood. The police take the class into custody during an investigation, but aside from ruling out an attack, are unable to determine the cause of the explosion. During custody, senior student Mara Carlyle suggests to the class that it could happen again, a sentiment taken seriously by her peers. Afterwards, an unknown person texts her, claiming to have had a crush on her for several years.

Following Katelyn's funeral service, Mara gets high on mushrooms purchased from school dealers, Jenna and Joe Dalton, and goes for tea with her best friend Tess; fellow student Dylan approaches the pair and reveals himself to be the unknown texter who said they had a crush on Mara. Dylan explains how he had begun thinking of life and how quickly it could end, and upon hearing Mara's suggestion of the incident repeating itself, realized that he needed to take action.

They begin seeing one another and attend a school football game and house party, although each is cut short when a jock, Perry Love, and drink server, Cranberry Bollinger, respectively explode, sending the attendees into a panic. Classes are cancelled for a while, and people begin to dub the explosions "The Covington Curse". The incidents attract the attention of numerous government agencies, who place FBI Agent Carla Rosetti on the case; she enlists Mara and Tess as aid.

While investigating the possible involvement of drugs, Mara goes for a drive with the Dalton twins; they explode and the car crashes. Dylan arrives and consoles a dazed Mara, before federal agents arrive in protective suits and detain them. The entire senior class is placed under observation while the government devises a "Snooze Button" pill to "cure" the students, during which multiple students explode. Realizing they should live like every day might be their last, Mara and Dylan continue seeing each other, pursuing a hedonistic lifestyle; they have sex and dance to Eighties music in an old barn.

School resumes for the senior class, although the townspeople begin to fear the students and Agent Rosetti inadvertently admits to Mara that the explosions may not yet be over. While demonstrating the supposed effectiveness of the pill at a school seminar, a volunteer student explodes, triggering a chain reaction of explosions in the classroom. Dozens of students explode during the ensuing rampage, whereas Mara and Dylan are separated by the mob in a struggle to escape the building. After reuniting with Mara, Dylan explodes, injuring her in the process.

Following Dylan's death, a despondent Mara turns to alcohol, and in the ensuing weeks drunkenly falls out with her parents and Tess, as well as accidentally breaking Agent Rosetti's car window with a stolen bottle of vodka. Mara also reads student comments online speculating that she might be the Covington Curse, as she was present at the scene of each occurring explosion. At the combined graduation/prom ceremony, Mara reconciles with Tess, who reveals that she is leaving town for a beach house that night and invites her to come. Believing herself to be the curse, Mara casually apologizes to the attendees for causing the explosions, but others chime in, claiming responsibility over circumstantial personal problems. Leaving the event, Mara visits Dylan's grave, and has a heart-to-heart conversation with his mother, who convinces her to move on with her life. Mara apologizes to her parents and sobers up.

After the rampage, the next version of the "Snooze Button" pill seems to be effective and the explosions stop anticlimactically, leaving 31 students in the senior class dead. Covington High is closed by the authorities and scheduled for demolition. Mara gains possession of Dylan's milk van and – with her parents' blessing – moves into the beach house with Tess, as they had intended to do since childhood. The film ends with Mara telling the viewers to enjoy life while it lasts, as, "The fuck else can you do?"

== Cast ==
- Katherine Langford as Mara
- Charlie Plummer as Dylan
- Yvonne Orji as Agent Rosetti
- Hayley Law as Tess, Mara's best friend
- Rob Huebel as Charlie, Mara's father
- Piper Perabo as Angela, Mara's mother

In addition, the drug dealing siblings, Jenna and Joe, are played by Laine MacNeil and Clive Holloway, respectively.

== Production ==
In June 2016, it was announced Awesomeness Films had acquired rights to adapt the novel of the same name by Aaron Starmer, with Brian Duffield writing the script, and ultimately directing. Matt Kaplan co-produced under the Awesomeness banner, while Nicki Cortese produced under her Jurassic Party Productions banner. In December 2017, Katherine Langford was set to star in the film.

In January 2018, Charlie Plummer and Hayley Law joined as co-stars. In February 2018, Piper Perabo, Rob Huebel, Yvonne Orji, Laine MacNeil, Clive Holloway, Bzhaun Rhoden, and Chris Shields were added in supporting roles.

Principal photography began in early 2018.

== Release ==
The film had a limited theatrical release on October 2, 2020, followed by video on demand on October 6, 2020, by Paramount Pictures.

== Reception ==
On the review aggregation website Rotten Tomatoes, the film holds an approval rating of 96% based on 67 reviews, with an average rating of 8.3/10. The website's critics' consensus reads, "A dark teen comedy with an explosive twist, Spontaneous reaffirms Katherine Langford as a rising star ― and marks debuting director Brian Duffield as a filmmaker to watch." Metacritic, which uses a weighted average, assigned the film a score of 78 out of 100, based on 7 critics, indicating "generally favorable" reviews.

Matt Zoller Seitz of RogerEbert.com gave Spontaneous 3 out of 4, while Leslie Felperin of The Guardian who gave the film a 4 out of 5 score, said that "this debut feature from writer-director Brian Duffield has plenty of gallows humour to leaven the gore and tragedy, and plenty of subtexts swimming under the surface like glittering, metaphorical koi."

Frank Scheck of The Hollywood Reporter called Spontaneous "explosively funny and touching".

== See also ==
- List of coming-of-age stories
- List of comedy horror films
- Spontaneous human combustion
