= Caitlin Bassett (actress) =

American army sergeant and actress (born 1990)

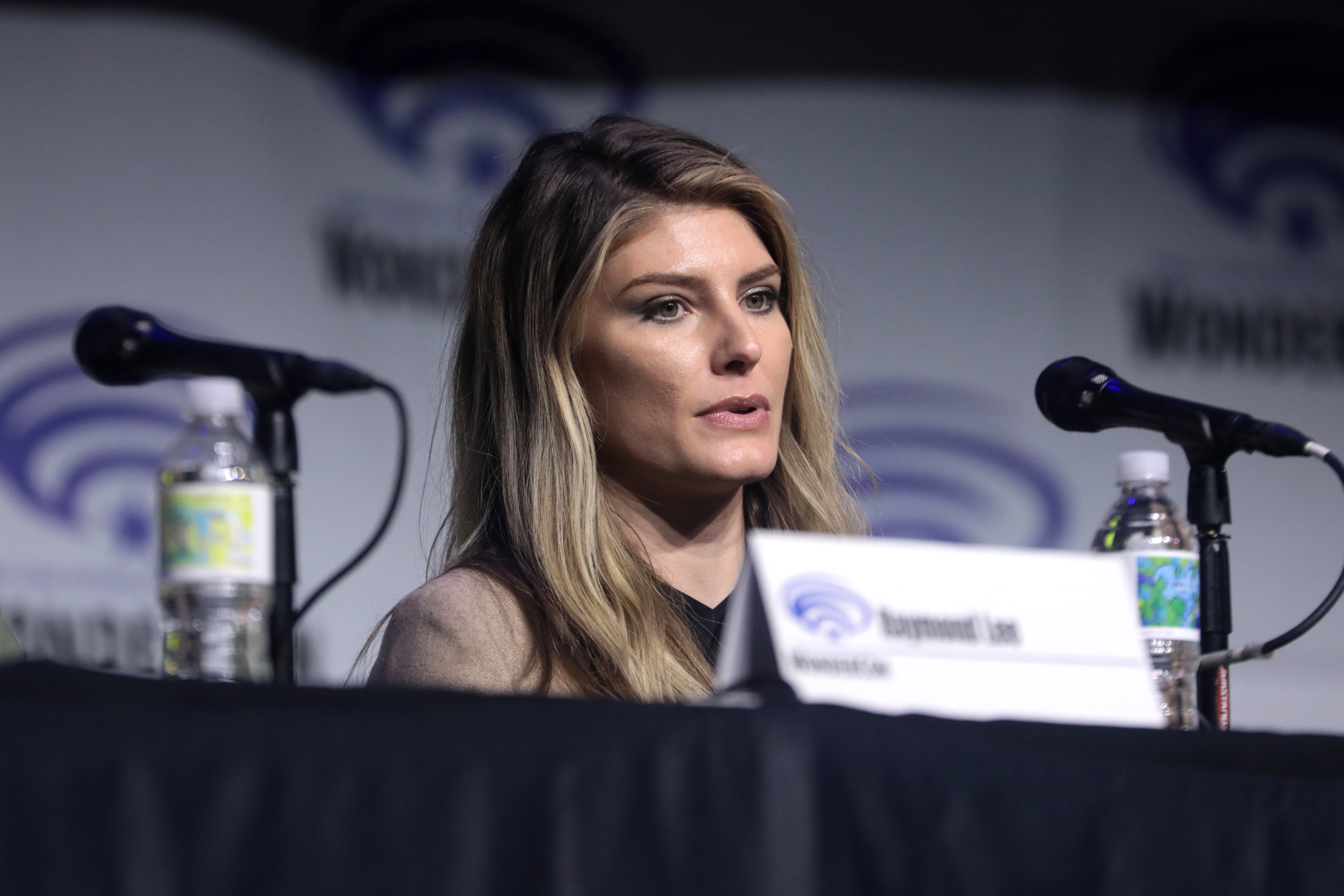
- Bassett at the 2023 WonderCon
- Born: March 16, 1990 (age 36); Maryland
- Education: University of Maryland (BS); Brooklyn Law School (dropped out)
- Occupation: Actress
- Years active: 2020–present
- Notable work: Quantum Leap
- Military career
- Allegiance: United States
- Branch: United States Army
- Service years: 2008-2015
- Rank: Staff Sergeant

Caitlin Amanda Bassett is an American actress and US Army veteran, who came to prominence for her work as a lead, playing Addison Augustine on NBC's Quantum Leap.

== Early life ==
Caitlin Bassett was born to Stephen Bassett, a Vietnam veteran and former TV and radio sportscaster, and Judith Bassett, a manager with the National Park Service. She grew up on a horse farm in Maryland where she was an equestrian and sang in the choir. Despite an interest in theater, she never took part in plays in high school.

== Education ==
In 2011, while serving in the Army and deployed to FOB Shank, Afghanistan, Bassett enrolled in the University of Maryland University College. In 2015 she graduated from the University of Maryland with a Bachelor of Science degree and left the US Army to attend Brooklyn Law School until 2017 before deciding to pursue a career in acting. Her formal acting education began at Stella Adler Studio of Acting where she was a conservatory student from 2017 to 2020.

In 2023 she returned to the University of Maryland to give a homecoming address to non-traditional students and alumni.

== Military service ==
In 2008, a week after her 18th birthday, Bassett enlisted in the US Army as Signals Intelligence Analyst. She completed Basic Combat Training (BCT) at Fort Leonard Wood, Missouri, and her AIT Advanced Individual Training at Goodfellow Air Force Base in San Angelo, Texas. She was then stationed at NSA Hawaii where she volunteered for her first deployment to FOB Shank, Afghanistan, in support of 10th Mountain Division. At 21 years old she was promoted to Sergeant.

She was then transferred to Fort Meade, Maryland and completed two more deployments - one to Afghanistan and one to Qatar supporting Special Forces. She ultimately attained the rank of Staff Sergeant and was honorably discharged in 2015.

== Acting career ==
After graduating from Stella Adler Studio of Acting, Bassett was selected out of over 40,000 applicants to be a part of the Disney/ABC Discovers Showcase in 2020.

In 2022 TV producer Martin Gero, calling her a "once-in-a-lifetime discovery," selected Bassett for her first major role as Addison Augustine on NBC's continuation of the Quantum Leap series.

In 2025, it was announced Bassett would star in Season 2 of The Terminal List.

== Philanthropy ==
Bassett routinely volunteers for philanthropic work, most notably helping evacuate Afghan refugees during the Fall of Kabul in 2021. She also is active in the charitable organization Veterans in Media and Entertainment, which focuses on helping other veterans find careers in the entertainment industry.

== Filmography ==
=== Film ===
| Year | Title | Role | Notes |
|---|---|---|---|
| 2020 | V Is for Vodka | Mrs. Hamill | Short Film |

=== Television ===
| Year | Title | Role | Notes |
|---|---|---|---|
| 2022–2024 | Quantum Leap | Addison Augustine | Main Cast |
| 2026 | NCIS: Origins | AUSA Monica Adams | 1 Episode |
| 2026 | The Terminal List | Agent Kim Scheer | 1 Episode |
