= Aaron Starmer =

American novelist

- Born: 1976 (age 49–50); Northern California, U.S.
- Education: Fayetteville–Manlius High School; Drew University (BA); New York University (MA)
- Occupation: Author
- Writing career
- Genre: Young adult fiction
- Website: www.aaronstarmer.com

Aaron Starmer (born 1976 in northern California) is an American author of young adult fiction novels, known for The Riverman Trilogy and Spontaneous. As of June 2016, he was working on another novel, entitled Meme. In 2016, it was reported that Awesomeness Films had bought the rights to adapt Spontaneous into a movie of the same name, which was released in 2020. He has also co-authored a book about camping along with Catharine Wells and Timothy Starmer. Also in 2016, Starmer appeared at the annual Texas Book Festival.

== Biography ==
Starmer was born in northern California and raised in suburban Syracuse, New York, where he graduated from Fayetteville–Manlius High School. He received a B.A. degree from Drew University and a Master of Arts degree from New York University. A longtime resident of Hoboken, New Jersey, he now lives in northern Vermont with his wife and two daughters.

== Reception ==
The Wall Street Journal named The Riverman, the first book of the Riverman Trilogy, one of the best books of 2014. Brian Truitt, writing for USA Today, gave Spontaneous 3 out of 4 stars, writing that "...Starmer’s originality and well-paced plot give needed life to a story filled with random death."

A Publishers Weekly reviewer lauded that Stramer, through Meme, "crafts a neo-noir-flavored revenge thriller that stabs at the heart of 21st-century isolation".

== Books ==
- The Best in Tent Camping: New York State (Menasha Ridge Press, 2007)
- Dweeb (Delacorte Press/Yearling Books, 2009)
- The Only Ones (Delacorte/Yearling, 2011)
- The Riverman Trilogy, which consists of the following three books:
  - The Riverman (Farrar, Straus & Giroux, 2014)
  - The Whisper (Farrar, Straus & Giroux, 2015)
  - The Storyteller (Farrar, Straus & Giroux, 2016)
- Spontaneous (Penguin Random House, 2016)
- Meme (2020)
- The Locker 37 Series (Penguin Workshop)
  - LOCKER 37: THE MAGIC ERASER (2020)
  - LOCKER 37: THE REWINDABLE CLOCK (2020)
  - LOCKER 37: THE RIDICULOUS AND WONDERFUL RAINBOW HAT (2020)
  - LOCKER 37: THE INTERDIMENSIONAL FISH STICKS (2020)
- A Million Views (Penguin Workshop, 2022)
