= Dark Was the Night (2018 film) =

- Directed by: Joshua Leonard
- Written by: Joshua Leonard
- Starring: Marisa Tomei; Charlie Plummer; Timothy Olyphant
- Release date: July 12, 2018 (Galway Film Fleadh)
- Running time: 80
- Country: United States
- Language: English

Dark Was the Night is a 2018 American drama film written and directed by Joshua Leonard and starring Marisa Tomei, Charlie Plummer and Timothy Olyphant.

The film premiered at the 2018 Galway Film Fleadh under its original title Behold My Heart.

== Plot ==
After the unexpected death of Steven Lang (Olyphant), his widow, Margaret (Tomei) and son, Marcus (Plummer), struggle to cope with their grief.

== Cast ==
- Marisa Tomei as Margaret Lang
- Charlie Plummer as Marcus Lang
- Timothy Olyphant as Steven Lang
- Mireille Enos as Nancy
- Emily Robinson as Tracy
- Nik Dodani as Seamus
- Sakina Jaffrey as Jane
- David Call as Jake
- Saidah Arrika Ekulona as Betsy
- Blesst Bowden as Beth
- Dakota Peterson as Tony
- Paris Peterson as Paul
- Savanna Reggio as Heather
- Veronica Diaz-Carranza as Victoria
- Karrie Cox as Christine Smith

== Release ==
The film premiered on July 12, 2018 at the Galway Film Fleadh in Ireland.

== Reception ==
In his review for The Hollywood Reporter, Neil Young classified the production as an "effective little indie [film]." Writing for The Times, Kevin Maher rated it 2/5 stars, and highlighted in his review that the "film about grief lacks dramatic tension".
