= Luke Gilford =

American film director (born 1986)

- Born: 1986 (age 39–40); Denver, Colorado, USA
- Occupations: Director, writer, photographer
- Notable work: The Future of Flesh, Connected, National Anthem: America’s Queer Rodeo, National Anthem (film)

Luke Gilford (born 1986) is a director, writer, and photographer based in New York City and Los Angeles. He has directed several short films, including The Future of Flesh, which showcased Prada collection narrated by Jane Fonda, and Connected, starring Pamela Anderson and Dree Hemingway. Gilford has directed music videos for Blood Orange, Troye Sivan, Christina Aguilera, and Kesha and has collaborated with Mercedes Benz and Maison Martin Margiela. Gilford's first monograph, National Anthem: America’s Queer Rodeo, documents America’s queer rodeo and members of the International Gay Rodeo Association (IGRA). In 2023, he made his feature film debut by directing and co-writing National Anthem, which premiered at the 2023 SXSW Festival, inspired by his monograph and attending Gay Rodeos.

== Early life and education ==
Gilford was born in Denver, Colorado and raised in Evergreen, Colorado and the San Francisco Bay Area. His father is a former rodeo champion and judge, and Gilford recollects growing up surrounded by an extensive collection of snakeskin boots, Stetson hats, and giant silver and gold champion belt buckles.

He studied fine art and photography under Barbara Kruger at the University of California, Los Angeles.

== Work ==
Gilford has documented and photographed a breadth of Americana and beauty from the Miss America pageant and the model Hari Nef to queer rodeos and R&B stars. In 2013, Gilford released The Future of Flesh, a short featuring Prada-clad models, a voice-over from Jane Fonda, and an original score by Jake Shears and Steven Stoner to launch Prada's F/W 2013 collection. His second short released in 2015, titled Connected, is a 10-minute film starring Pamela Anderson, features as "a woman grappling with aging, self-perception and transformation in a technologically optimized world."

In 2023, Gilford made his feature film debut by directing and co-writing National Anthem, inspired by his National Anthem America's Queer Rodeo monograph, which premiered at the 2023 SXSW Festival on March 10, 2023, to positive critical reviews.
