= Quantum Leap season 2 =

1989–90 season of American TV series

Quantum Leap
- Season 2
- DVD cover
- No. of episodes: 22

Release
- Original network: NBC
- Original release: September 20, 1989 – May 9, 1990

Season chronology
- ← Previous; Season 1 Next → Season 3

Season two of Quantum Leap ran on NBC from September 20, 1989, to May 9, 1990. The series follows the exploits of Dr. Sam Beckett and his project Quantum Leap, through which he involuntarily leaps through spacetime, temporarily taking over a host in order to correct historical mistakes. Season two consists of 22 episodes.

For his work this season, Dean Stockwell won the Golden Globe for Best Supporting Actor – Series, Miniseries or Television Film, while the episode "Pool Hall Blues" won the series its second of three consecutive Primetime Emmy Awards for Outstanding Cinematography.

== Episodes ==
No. overall	No. in season	Title	Directed by	Written by	Leap details (Name, date & location)	Original release date	Prod. code	Viewers (millions)
10	1	"Honeymoon Express"	Aaron Lipstadt	Donald P. Bellisario	Unnamed Firefighter; 1957; Unknown Location / Tom McBride; April 27, 1960; New York, New York	September 20, 1989	65411	13.5
After saving a cat from a tree as a firefighter in 1957, Sam leaps into Tom McBride (Ron Chabidon), a New York City cop on his honeymoon with his new wife, Diane (Alice Adair), where he must save himself from Diane's jealous and sociopathic ex-husband, Roget (Mathieu Carrière). To make matters worse, Quantum Leap's funding is in danger of being cut off, stranding Sam in the past, unless he can make a significant change in history; Al encourages him to attempt to prevent the U2 flight from being shot down over the Soviet Union. Sam is reluctant to deviate from Ziggy's assessment that Sam's goal is to save Tom's life and help Diane pass the bar exam. Ultimately, Sam succeeds in those two tasks, but is unable to alter the U-2 incident. However, this results in a sympathetic Diane later becoming a US senator and the chairman of the Senate committee that is deciding the project's fate, replacing the original skeptical and hostile senator (Warren Frost), and she approves the budget. Note: This is the first instance where Sam has to kill someone to complete his mission.
11	2	"Disco Inferno"	Gilbert Shilton	Paul Brown	Chad Stone; April 1, 1976; Burbank, California	September 27, 1989	65401	13.0
Sam leaps into professional stuntman Chad Stone (Kevin Light) on the set of a disco-themed disaster film. Sam must prevent his host's brother, Chris (Kris Kamm), from being the victim of a stunt gone wrong while also steering him toward a career in music. To do so, Sam must prevent the boy's father, stunt coordinator Ray (Michael Greene), from keeping Chris away from music. Notes: 1) This is the first episode in which Sam mentions that he had a brother who died in Vietnam. 2) This episode includes a Saturday Night Live Coneheads sketch with Bill Murray, although the first such sketch was January 21, 1978, almost two years after the leap. As well, Saturday Night Live did not air on Thursdays, which was when Sam was watching the show. Also, Sam had to do a stunt for the movie Earthquake (1974 film), which was made in 1974, two years before the leap.
12	3	"The Americanization of Machiko"	Gilbert Shilton	Charlie Coffey	Charles Lee MacKenzie; August 4, 1953; Oak Creek, Ohio	October 11, 1989	65406	14.1
Sam leaps into Charles Lee MacKenzie (Bill Arnold), a US Navy aviation machinist's mate returning to his family farm in Ohio with Machiko (Leila Lee Olsen), his Japanese bride, after being stationed in Japan for two years. Sam must help his host's mother (K Callan) accept his new wife, fend off the advances of his ex-girlfriend (Elena Stiteler), and fight off a potentially deadly response from Rusty (Patrick Massett), a racist veteran of World War II. Note: This is the second of two episodes where Sam leaps into a host after his own conception but before his own birth, revealed in the series finale to be August 8, 1953, four days after the date in this episode. This differs from the two episodes ("The Leap Back" and "The Leap Between The States") which contradicted the show's construct of Sam leaping within his lifetime, though the reasons for those events are explicitly explained in both those episodes. The end also features Sam leaping into Jesse Tyler and showing the beginning of "The Color of Truth" due to the next broadcast being set to be a rerun of that episode.
13	4	"What Price Gloria?"	Alan J. Levi	Deborah Pratt	Samantha Stormer; October 16, 1961; Detroit, Michigan	October 25, 1989	65017	14.3
Sam leaps into a woman for the first time; specifically, a stunning blonde named Samantha Stormer (played by LaReine Chabut). He must prevent Gloria (Jean Sagal), his host's roommate, from killing herself when her married boyfriend, Samantha's boss Buddy (John Calvin), refuses to divorce his wife. Sam also has to deal with sexual harassment from Buddy, an auto executive who makes business decisions convinced "the good times are here to stay", whereas Sam drops hints that the American auto industry is headed for a rude awakening. Note: This episode has a scene where Sam and Gloria look into a mirror simultaneously, reflecting his host and Gloria. No special effects are used – Gloria is played in the "reflection" by Liz Sagal, Jean's twin sister, who previously starred alongside Jean on Double Trouble.
14	5	"Blind Faith"	David G. Phinney	Scott Shepard	Andrew Ross; February 6, 1964; New York City	November 1, 1989	65402	13.1
Sam leaps into Carnegie Hall as Andrew Ross (Billy Burdin), a blind concert pianist. His time in New York City overlaps with The Beatles' Ed Sullivan appearance, and a serial killer active in Central Park. His apartment neighbour, NYPD Officer Peter O'Shannon (Kevin Skousen), is pulling double duty with crowd control for the mobs of screaming Beatlemaniacs. Sam must save his host's girlfriend, Michelle Stevens (Cynthia Bain), from being strangled by the killer, while also convincing Michelle's bitter single-mother (Jennifer Rhodes) that the young couple are right for each other. Note: Al informs Sam that he is an accomplished concert pianist who has played at Carnegie Hall before, "I mean, you – you'll play here later, I mean, uh, you'll play here sometime in the future, when you're 19".
15	6	"Good Morning, Peoria"	Michael Zinberg	Chris Ruppenthal	Howlin' Chick Howell; September 9, 1959; Peoria, Illinois	November 8, 1989	65408	15.3
Sam leaps into "Howlin'" Chick Howell (Douglas Ibold), a Good Morning, Vietnam-style DJ at a radio station in Peoria, just as local newspaperman Fred Beaman (Richard McKenzie) convinces the city council to ban rock & roll. Sam and station owner Rachel Porter (Patricia Richardson) barricade themselves in the station and thwart several attempts by the authorities to take the station off the air. Notes: Sam teaches Chubby Checker (in a cameo) to "Do 'The Twist'", when Checker drops off a demo of the song.
16	7	"Thou Shalt Not..."	Randy Roberts	Tammy Ader	David Basch; February 2, 1974; Los Angeles, California	November 15, 1989	65409	14.0
Sam is David Basch (John J. Reiner), a Rabbi whose brother's family is still suffering from the death of their son in a plane crash. When Sam must perform a bat mitzvah, Al talks him through it, revealing that his third wife was Jewish. Sam must help his host's brother, Joe (James Sutorius), stop blaming his wife, Irene (Terri Hanauer), for their son's death – which is destined to drive her into an affair with Bert Glasserman (Russ Tamblyn), a sleazy author who is secretly using her (and other married women) to write a book. After saving their marriage, Sam does not leap until he makes Joe and Irene realize how, in their grief, they have shut out their remaining child, 13-year-old Karen (Lindsay Fisher). Notes: Sam's signature leap-in line of "Oh, Boy!" is replaced by "Oy Vey!" During the leap, Sam performs the Heimlich maneuver on Dr. Henry Heimlich.
17	8	"Jimmy"	James Whitmore, Jr.	Paul M. Belous & Robert Wolterstorff	Jimmy LaMotta; October 14, 1964; Oakland, California	November 22, 1989	65407	15.8
Sam leaps into Jimmy LaMotta (Brad Silverman), a young man with Down syndrome and a childlike intellect who needs to show that he can keep his job at the docks or else he will die in a mental institution. His host lives with his brother and fellow dockworker Frank (John D'Aquino), sister-in-law Connie (Laura Harrington) and adolescent nephew Corey (Ryan McWhorter). The effort is made more difficult by Blue (Michael Madsen), a dockworker who teases and intimidates Jimmy for being disabled. Further compounding the effort, Connie does not want Jimmy living with them. Al feels a deep attachment to the mission, revealing that he had a younger sister who had a developmental disability and died in an institution. Sam earns acceptance from the dockworkers, and Connie, when he saves Corey's life with CPR.
18	9	"So Help Me God"	Andy Cadiff	Deborah Pratt	Leonard Dancey; July 29, 1957; Louisiana	November 29, 1989	65410	16.9
Sam becomes Leonard Dancey (Travis Michael Holder), a milquetoast defense attorney who's defending Lila Berry (Tyra Ferrell), a black woman accused of murdering Houston Cotter, a prominent white man in a town steeped in racism. Houston was the son of Captain Colton Cotter (Byrne Piven) and his wife Sadie (Kathleen Noone); Sadie had taken Lila in to their house when she was orphaned years earlier. Sam must deal with a confession that Lila supposedly gave, though he learns that Lila is illiterate, and deduces that she refuses to take the stand because she is trying to hide the identity of the real killer.
19	10	"Catch a Falling Star"	Donald P. Bellisario	Paul Brown	Ray Hutton; May 21, 1979; Syracuse, New York	December 6, 1989	65413	13.4
Sam is Ray Hutton (Michael Carl), understudy to John O'Malley (John Cullum), the alcoholic leading man in a touring production of Man of La Mancha. He must prevent the obnoxious actor from ending his career with a drunken fall on stage that breaks his leg. This situation is greatly complicated when Sam decides that he does not want to leap after meeting actress Nicole (Michele Pawk), the former piano teacher whom he had a boyhood crush on – and who is in love with Sam's host. Note: Soon to be (July 1990) Northern Exposure cast members John Cullum and Janine Turner guest star. Cullum would also serve as director of "All-Americans", which aired four episodes after this one.
20	11	"A Portrait for Troian"	Michael Zinberg	Story by : John Hill & Scott Shepard; Teleplay by : Scott Shepard & Donald P. Bellisario	Timothy Mintz; February 7, 1971; Near Los Angeles, California	December 13, 1989	65019	12.9
Sam is Timothy Mintz (Donald P. Bellisario), a parapsychologist working with Troian Claridge (Deborah Pratt), a young widow who insists that her late husband is haunting her. The husband drowned in a lake on the property, though his body was never recovered – the same fate as his ancestor, Priscilla Claridge, in 1840. Sam's mission is to keep Troian from drowning in the same lake. Sam gets little help from the other residents in Troian's mansion, her brother Jimmy (Robert Torti) and housekeeper Miss Stoltz (Carolyn Seymour). A device that Sam's host invented to record paranormal activity detects Sam's leap in, and allows those near it to hear Al, though it does not explain how Miss Stoltz looks straight at Al when he first appears. Sam is able to find electronic devices that reveal that Jimmy is using to "haunt" his sister, hoping to have her committed and giving him access to her fortune. The Sylmar earthquake dislodges bodies from the lake bottom, including the ancestor, revealed to be Miss Stoltz, whose ghost had been serving as the housekeeper. Note: the episode includes series creator Bellisario, and series writer-producer Deborah Pratt – whose character is named after the couple's young daughter Troian Bellisario, who appeared two episodes later, in "Another Mother". Seymour returns for three episodes in season 5, in a recurring role as Zoey, the Holographic observer for the Evil Leaper.
21	12	"Animal Frat"	Gilbert Shilton	Chris Ruppenthal	Knute "Wild Thing" Wileton; October 19, 1967; Meeks College in California	January 3, 1990	65417	15.6
Sam leaps into all-American college jock Knute "Wild Thing" Wileton (Jeff Benson), who must prevent anti-war protests from turning violent and resulting in the destruction of the science block and killing a student unexpectedly inside, thus ruining the life of Elisabeth (Stacy Edwards), a young woman opposed to the war. Note: The episode is influenced by the 1970 Sterling Hall bombing, including the perpetrators going on the run for years, like Elisabeth would have if Sam had not fulfilled his mission.
22	13	"Another Mother"	Joseph L. Scanlan	Deborah Pratt	Linda Bruckner; September 30, 1981; Scottsdale, Arizona	January 10, 1990	65415	16.8
Sam is Linda Bruckner (Molly Meeker), a single mother juggling raising three children and her job as a realtor. Sam must save her 15-year-old son, Kevin (Michael Stoyanov), who will disappear in the next 24 hours, only his bloody clothing found months later. Matters are initially complicated when Al and Sam are visible to the pre-school child, Teresa (Troian Bellisario), but she and Al become friends. Kevin is sweet on fellow student Jackie Arnett (Allison Barron), who is willingly treated as a strumpet by other male students. When three of the others convince Jackie to embarrass Kevin with a feigned sexual encounter, he runs off into the night, only to be kidnapped by two perverts in a van. Al guides Sam to the van, where he discovers that he is trained in numerous martial arts, dispatching the killers. At school the next day, Jackie apologizes to Kevin and asks him out. Note: In this episode Sam learns that before he began to leap that he was trained in various martial arts including but not limited to Karate, Judo, and Muay Thai
23	14	"All-Americans"	John Cullum	Paul Brown & Donald P. Bellisario	Eddie Vega; November 6, 1962; Woodland Hills, California	January 17, 1990	65418	14.7
Sam leaps into Eddie Vega (Corey Smith), a football player at El Camino High School being raised by a single father, Manuel (Pepe Serna). Sam must prevent his host's best friend, Chuey Martinez (Richard Coca), from throwing the big game and ruining both their chances at college scholarships. Chuey is being pressured by local gambler Ruben de Guerra (Fausto Bara), who will otherwise force Chuey's illegal immigrant single mother, Celia (Ruth Britt), to have sex with him or face deportation. Sam manages to talk Chuey into helping him win the game, but does not leap out until he helps Manuel and Celia admit that they love each other and should get married. Note: During the leap, Al is viewing the 28 January 1996 Super Bowl XXX, claiming that "the Steelers are trailing by three" points. When the game was actually played six years after the episode first aired, the Pittsburgh Steelers indeed trailed the Dallas Cowboys by 20–17 with 4:15 left in the game, after which an interception resulted in a 27–17 victory for the Cowboys.
24	15	"Her Charm"	Christopher T. Welch	Story by : Paul M. Belous, Robert Wolterstorff, Deborah Pratt & Donald P. Bellisario; Teleplay by : Deborah Pratt & Donald P. Bellisario	Peter Langley; September 26, 1973; Boston, Massachusetts	February 7, 1990	65416	18.1
Sam is Peter Langley (Mark Harigian), an FBI agent who is tasked with protecting Dana Barrenger (Teri Austin), a woman in the Witness Protection Program, from a deadly Greek American Mafia boss (John Snyder) who has an uncanny ability to find them. Dana catches Sam talking to the unseen Al on a number of occasions, which helps when Dana realizes that Sam's host is working for Nick and Sam is able to convince her that he is not Peter. Sam kills Nick just as he fires at Dana, but does not leap out until he meets his former professor, revealing that he is Sam Beckett and that their "string theory" (which leads to the Quantum Leap project) works.
25	16	"Freedom"	Alan J. Levi	Chris Ruppenthal	George Washaki; November 22, 1970; Nevada	February 14, 1990	65423	17.0
Sam leaps into George Washaki (Jim Jaimes), a young Native American man, and must take his dying grandfather (Frank Salsedo) back to the reservation so he can die in peace, but the town sheriff (Leon Rippy) is out to stop them.
26	17	"Good Night, Dear Heart"	Christopher T. Welch	Paul Brown	Melvin Spooner; November 9, 1957; Riven Rock, Massachusetts	March 7, 1990	65424	17.0
Sam leaps into a mortician named Melvin Spooner (Marvyn Byrkett), just as he prepares to bury a young woman who committed suicide. However, Sam soon starts to believe that she was murdered despite the fact that the local police, her employer, and even Al refute this, and quickly becomes obsessed with the victim in a quest to find the truth.
27	18	"Pool Hall Blues"	Joe Napolitano	Randy Holland	Charlie "Black Magic" Walters; September 4, 1954; Chicago, Illinois	March 14, 1990	65422	14.8
Sam leaps into Charlie "Black Magic" Walters (Robert 'Rags' Woods), one of the greatest pool men in America and Al's childhood mentor. He must help his granddaughter Violet (Shari Headley) keep her nightclub and rescue it from under the corrupting influence of a criminal loan shark.
28	19	"Leaping in Without a Net"	Christopher T. Welch	Tommy Thompson	Victor Panzini; November 18, 1958; Near Denver, Colorado	March 28, 1990	65421	16.9
Sam leaps into trapeze artist Victor Panzini (played by Ted Nordblum), who must prevent his host's sister, Eva (Fabiana Udenio), from performing a dangerous stunt that will result in her death; a mission which is made more difficult by his fear of heights.
29	20	"Maybe Baby"	Michael Zinberg	Julie Brown & Paul Brown	Buster; March 11, 1963; Texas	April 4, 1990	65428	17.0
Sam leaps into Buster (Jay Boryea), a bouncer in the midst of an infant kidnapping scheme with Bunny (Julie Brown), a ditzy, compulsive liar, as his partner. Sam and Al cannot agree on whether Sam is there to help the pair take the baby to Clayton, New Mexico, or return her to her rightful guardian. Note: episode guest star Julie Brown also co-wrote this episode.
30	21	"Sea Bride"	Joe Napolitano	Deborah Pratt	Phillip Dumont; June 3, 1954; RMS Queen Mary in the Upper New York Bay	May 2, 1990	65430	14.2
Sam leaps into Phillip Dumont (played by Kent Phillips), the ex-husband of young heiress Catherine Farrington (Beverly Leech), who is preparing to marry gangster Vinnie "the Viper" Loggia (James Harper) aboard the Queen Mary, and Sam must get them back together.
31	22	"M.I.A."	Michael Zinberg	Donald P. Bellisario	Jake Rawlings; April 1, 1969; San Diego, California	May 9, 1990	65412	15.6
Sam leaps into police detective Jake Rawlings (played by Doug Bauer), and is told by Al that his mission is to stop Beth (Susan Diol), a young woman whose husband is missing in action in Vietnam, from marrying someone else. However, Sam's attempts to stop her seem doomed to fail, and things become more clear when her MIA husband is revealed to be a younger Al.
