= Pool Hall Blues =

- Quantum Leap episode
- Episode no.: Season 2 Episode 18
- Directed by: Joe Napolitano
- Written by: Randy Holland
- Cinematography by: Michael W. Watkins
- Original air date: March 14, 1990
- Running time: 48 min

Guest appearances
- Ken Foree, Robert Gossett, Shari Headley, Theodore Wilson

Episode chronology
← Previous "Good Night, Dear Heart"	Next → "Leaping in Without a Net"

"Pool Hall Blues" is a 1990 episode of the American science fiction television series Quantum Leap. Lead character Sam Beckett "leaps" (travels through time) into the body of an African American man in 1954: Charlie "Black Magic" Walters, one of the (fictional) greatest pool players in America, and a childhood mentor of supporting character Al. Beckett as Walters must help Walters's granddaughter keep her Chicago nightclub and rescue it from under the corrupting influence of a criminal loan shark. The episode, the 18th of season 2, was written by Randy Holland and directed by Joe Napolitano. It originally aired on March 14, 1990. The episode won the series its second of three consecutive Primetime Emmy Awards for Outstanding Cinematography.

== Plot ==
It is September 4, 1954 in Chicago, Illinois, and Sam Beckett has "leaped" into the body of pool hustler Charlie "Black Magic" Walters, a former mentor of Al Calavicci. Magic's granddaughter, Violet, has borrowed money from a loan shark to convert an old pool hall into a blues nightclub. Unfortunately, disreputable pool hustler Eddie Davies has purchased the note for Violet's loan from the loan shark and is using it to goad Magic into a series of games of pool, threatening to take over the nightclub if Magic refuses. Unable to obtain a bank loan to purchase the note, Sam agrees to the match, with Ziggy providing Sam (who has no clue how to play pool) with guidance to allow him to play at Magic's level. Despite Eddie's interference - including having his henchman destroy Magic's beloved cue stick, Alberta - and the loss of Ziggy's guidance at a critical point in the match, Sam defeats Eddie and wins the note.

== Cast ==
The principal cast of the episode were:

- Scott Bakula as Dr. Sam Beckett
- Dean Stockwell as Admiral Al Calavicci
- Alton Blair Carter as Lester Brown
- Ken Foree as The Brush
- Robert Gossett as Charles Griffin
- Shari Headley as Violet Walters
- J. W. Smith as Eddie Davies
- Annie Waterman as Miss White
- Theodore Wilson as Jimmy Grady
- Robert "Rags" Woods as Charlie "Black Magic" Walters

== Awards ==
"Pool Hall Blues" won the 1990 Primetime Emmy Award for Outstanding Cinematography, for the camera work of Michael W. Watkins. The series had won the 1989 Emmy for Outstanding Cinematography (Roy H. Wagner, pilot episode "Genesis"), and would three-peat when it also won the 1991 Emmy (Watkins, season 3 episode "The Leap Home (Part 2) – Vietnam").
