= Shari Headley =

American actress (born 1964)

- Born: July 15, 1964 (age 62); New York City, U.S.
- Occupations: Actress; model
- Years active: 1984–present
- Known for: Lisa McDowell – Coming to America
- Spouse: Christopher Martin (m. 1993; div. 1995)
- Children: 1

Shari Headley (born July 15, 1964) is an American actress. She is best known for her role as Lisa McDowell in the 1988 box-office hit romantic comedy film Coming to America and its sequel Coming 2 America (2021). Headley also has appeared in films The Preacher's Wife (1996) and Johnson Family Vacation (2004).

On television, Headley starred as Detective Mimi Reed in the ABC daytime soap opera All My Children on a regular basis from 1991 to 1994. As lead actress, she starred in the Fox short-lived drama series 413 Hope St. (1997–1998), for which she received NAACP Image Award for Outstanding Actress in a Drama Series nomination. From 2014 to 2016, Headley starred as villainous Jennifer Sallison in the Oprah Winfrey Network primetime soap opera The Haves and the Have Nots.

== Early life ==
Born in Queens, New York City, Headley is the youngest of four children. She is of part Trinidadian descent. Headley's father worked as a dental technician, and had wanted his daughter to be a doctor. In college, she was a premedical student, minoring in drama and performing in school plays.

In 1984, Headley's modeling career began after her sister submitted a photo of Shari to the Ford Modeling Agency, without Headley's knowledge. She was a finalist in Eileen Ford's Face of the 80s campaign, and joined Ford afterwards. Headley modeled for various magazines, including Glamour and Mademoiselle.

== Career ==
Headley made her acting debut appearing in an episode of NBC sitcom The Cosby Show in 1985. Headley later appeared on Miami Vice, Quantum Leap, and Matlock. In 1988, she portrayed Lisa McDowell, an heiress to a fast food restaurant, in romantic comedy Coming to America. Eddie Murphy appears as her love interest in the film. Being relatively unknown at the time, the film's director John Landis stated she was chosen in the role for that reason. One reviewer opined she and Murphy "shined" together, though another critic found Headley's performance "bland." The film was a box-office success grossing a worldwide total of $288,752,301.

The following year, Headley had a starring role alongside Louis Gossett Jr. in the short-lived ABC drama series, Gideon Oliver. In the series, she played Zina, the daughter of Gossett's character. Later that year, she co-starred in the Kojak television film series. In 1991, Headley joined the cast of ABC daytime soap opera, All My Children playing police officer Mimi Reed. At the 25th NAACP Image Awards, she received an NAACP Image Award for Outstanding Actress in a Daytime Drama Series nomination, but lost to Victoria Rowell. Headley received a second nomination the following year. She was a regular on All My Children from 1991 to 1994, and returned to the series in 1995 and 2005.

After leaving the soap, she guest-starred on New York Undercover, Walker, Texas Ranger, and Cosby. In 1996, she had a supporting role in the comedy-drama film The Preacher's Wife directed by Penny Marshall. In 1997, Headley landed a leading role as Juanita Barnes in the short-lived FOX drama series, 413 Hope St. alongside Richard Roundtree. The series was cancelled after only ten episodes, but Headley received an NAACP Image Award for Outstanding Actress in a Drama Series nomination for her performance. Headley portrayed Barbara, a woman looking for a man, in the pilot episode of Love Boat: The Next Wave. She appeared as a counselor on sitcom The Wayans Bros..

In the early 2000s, Headley returned to daytime television playing the recurring roles of Felicia Boudreau on Guiding Light (2001–2002) and Heather Engle in The Bold and the Beautiful (2004–2005). In 2004, she played Mack Johnson's (portrayed by Steve Harvey) wife Jacqueline in the comedy film, Johnson Family Vacation. In 2007, she appeared in the comedy-drama film Towelhead. She also had guest starring roles on Veronica Mars, House, Castle, and Switched at Birth.

In 2014, she joined the cast of Oprah Winfrey Network primetime soap opera, The Haves and the Have Nots created by Tyler Perry, playing District Attorney Jennifer Sallison. She was promoted to series regular as of season four. In 2019, she had a recurring role in On Becoming a God in Central Florida. Headley reprised her role of Queen Lisa Joffer from Coming to America in the sequel Coming 2 America in 2021.

== Personal life ==
Headley was married to actor and entertainer Christopher Martin, better known as "Play" from the hip-hop rap duo Kid N' Play, from May 1993 until they divorced in June 1995. Martin and Headley have one son together.

== Filmography ==
=== Film ===
Year	Title	Role	Notes
1987	The Pick-up Artist	Girl Painter with Ladder	
1988	Coming to America	Lisa McDowell	
1989	Kojak: Ariana	Trish Van Hogan	TV movie
1990	Kojak: None So Blind	Trish Van Hogan	TV movie
1996	The Preacher's Wife	Arlene Chattan	
1997	A Woman Like That	Herself	
2004	Johnson Family Vacation	Jacqueline Johnson	
2007	Towelhead	Mrs. Bradley	
2008	Belly 2: Millionaire Boyz Club	Alexis	Video
2013	Act Like You Love Me	Tianna	
2014	The Congregation	Maple	
2015	Ex-Free	Wendy	
2018	Goosebumps 2: Haunted Halloween	Mrs. Carter	
2019	Three's Complicated	Imani	TV movie
2021	Coming 2 America	Lisa McDowell	

=== Television ===
Year	Title	Role	Notes
1985	The Cosby Show	Mrs. Dubois	Episode: "Denise's Friend"
1986	Miami Vice	Cindy	Episode: "French Twist"
1988	The New Hollywood Squares	Herself	Episode: "Episode #3.6"
1989	Gideon Oliver	Zina Oliver	Main Cast
1990	Quantum Leap	Violet Walters	Episode: "Pool Hall Blues"
1990	Matlock	Model Carla Royce	Episode: "The Cover Girl"
1991–96	All My Children	Detective Mimi Reed	Regular Cast
1995	New York Undercover	Leanne	Episode: "Brotherhood"
1996	Walker, Texas Ranger	Vanessa St. John	Episode: "Behind the Badge"
1996	Cosby	Victoria the Nude Model	Episode: "No Nudes Is Good Nudes"
1997	Soul Train	Herself/Guest Host	Episode: "Mint Condition/Erykah Badu/Quad City DJ's"
1997–98	413 Hope St.	Juanita Barnes	Main Cast
1998	Love Boat: The Next Wave	Barbara	Episode: "Smooth Sailing"
1998	Getting Personal	Fake Robyn	Episode: "Bring in 'Da Milo, Bring in 'Da Robyn"
1998	Malcolm & Eddie	Veronica	Episode: "Twisted Sisters"
1998	For Your Love	Maya	Episode: "The Sister Act"
1999	The Wayans Bros.	Dawn	Episode: "Crazy 4 U" & "Three on a Couch"
2001–02	The Guiding Light	Felicia Boudreau	Regular Cast
2003	Half & Half	Barbara	Episode: "The Big Bitter Baby Shower Episode"
2004	One on One	Pamela	Episode: "Sleepless in Baltimore"
2004–05	The Bold and the Beautiful	Heather Engle	Regular Cast
2005	All My Children	Detective Mimi Reed	Regular Cast
2005	Veronica Mars	Vanessa Hamilton	Episode: "Lord of the Bling"
2005	House	Dr. Arlene Marks	Episode: "Kids"
2009	Castle	Nicole Cameron	Episode: "Love Me Dead"
2010	10 Things I Hate About You	Marcheline	Episode: "The Winner Takes It All"
2012	L.A. Hair	Herself	Episode: "First Cut Is the Deepest"
2012	Celebrity Ghost Stories	Herself	Episode: "Tyler Blackburn/Lainie Kazan/Shari Headley"
2014	Love That Girl	Maxine	Episode: "Gullible Is as Gullible Does"
2014–16	The Haves and the Have Nots	Jennifer Sallison	Recurring Cast: Season 2-3, Main Cast: Season 4
2015	Switched at Birth	Gwendolyn Berdick	Recurring Cast: Season 4
2019	Star	Houston Connelly	Recurring Cast: Season 3
2019	On Becoming a God in Central Florida	Harmony	Recurring Cast

=== Documentary ===
Year	Title
1990	Paris Is Burning

=== Music videos ===
Year	Title	Artist
1985	"Half Crazy"	Johnny Gill
1988	"Sarah Sarah"	Jonathan Butler
1994	"Before I Let You Go"	Blackstreet
1999	"Wild Wild West"	Will Smith
