= Quantum Leap season 5 =

Quantum Leap
- Season 5
- DVD cover
- No. of episodes: 22

Release
- Original network: NBC
- Original release: September 22, 1992 – May 5, 1993

Season chronology
- ← Previous; Season 4

Season five of Quantum Leap ran on NBC from September 22, 1992, to May 5, 1993. The series follows the exploits of Dr. Sam Beckett and his Project Quantum Leap, through which he involuntarily leaps through spacetime, temporarily taking over a host in order to correct historical mistakes. Season five consists of 22 episodes (when counting "Lee Harvey Oswald" as two separate episodes).

This season, the series gained a new theme song but returned to season 4's title sequence and theme in the series finale, "Mirror Image". This updated theme is not used in televised syndication versions of the episodes but it is used in the Peacock broadcasts.

The episode "Lee Harvey Oswald (Part 1)" won the Primetime Emmy Award for Outstanding Single-Camera Picture Editing for a Series.

== Episodes ==
| No. overall | No. in season | Title | Directed by | Written by | Leap details (Name, date & location) | Original release date | Prod. code | Viewers (millions) |
|---|---|---|---|---|---|---|---|---|
| 76 | 1 | "Lee Harvey Oswald (Part 1) – Leaping on a String" | James Whitmore Jr. | Donald P. Bellisario | Lee Harvey Oswald; March 21, 1963 / Dallas, Texas; October 5–7, 1957; Atsugi, Kanagawa, Japan / January 6, 1959; Tustin, California | September 22, 1992 | 68102A | 16.6 |
Over a period of six years, Sam leaps into various points in the life of Lee Harvey Oswald (Willie Garson) in an effort to seemingly prevent him from killing President John F. Kennedy or find the truth about the events that day. However, the objective is made more complex by the fact that their minds are merging, and Sam starts to believe he is Oswald. During his leaps whenever Oswald's mind is ascendant, he lashes out at wife Marina Oswald (Natasha Pavlovich), girlfriend Mariska (Donna Magnani) and his training leader, Sgt. Lopez (Reni Santoni). He then attempts to defect to Russia and divulge classified US military information. Note: Originally shown as a two-hour episode. Series creator Donald P. Bellisario, who actually met the real Oswald in 1959 when they both served in the Marine Corps, wrote this episode as a rebuttal to the 1991 film JFK, and believed that there was no assassination conspiracy and that Oswald was perfectly capable of acting alone in killing Kennedy.
| 77 | 2 | "Lee Harvey Oswald (Part 2) – Leap to Judgement" | James Whitmore Jr. | Donald P. Bellisario | Lee Harvey Oswald; October 21, 1959; Lubyanka in Moscow, USSR / April 10, 1963; Dallas, Texas / August 9, 1963; New Orleans, Louisiana / November 21–22, 1963; Dallas, Texas | September 22, 1992 | 68102B | 16.6 |
After Sam is forced to attempt suicide to maintain history, Ziggy tries a procedure that unintentionally makes Oswald's personality harder for Sam to control. Fleeing home after the General Walker assassination attempt, and handing out "Hands off Cuba" Pamphlets, and the date of Dallas is getting nearer. Is Sam supposed to save the President, as Sam believes, or unearth the multiplicity of conspiracies that Al espouses? Oswald is revealed to be the lone assassin of JFK, with Al speculating that people found all the conspiracies easier than believing that one man could kill the President that easily. Sam makes a final leap into U.S. Secret Service agent Clint Hill, who climbed on the back of the President's limousine during the assassination. Al reveals that Sam has succeeded in his actual mission: saving the life of Jackie Kennedy (Karen Ingram), who was killed along with JFK in the original timeline of the show's universe.
| 78 | 3 | "Leaping of the Shrew" | Alan J. Levi | Robin Jill Bernheim & Richard C. Okie | Nikos Stathatos; September 27, 1956; Aegean Sea | September 29, 1992 | 68104 | 15.9 |
Sam finds his patience tested when he leaps into Nikos Stathatos (Socrates Alafouzos), a man stuck in a lifeboat with bratty, self-obsessed heiress Vanessa Foster (Brooke Shields) and end up stuck on an island from which they will not be rescued for nine years. Note: The episode refers to Swept Away (1974). Brooke Shields also starred in the somewhat similar The Blue Lagoon (1980).
| 79 | 4 | "Nowhere to Run" | Alan J. Levi | Tommy Thompson | Ronald Miller; August 10, 1968; San Diego, California | October 6, 1992 | 68103 | 14.3 |
Sam leaps into Ronald Miller (Michael Carpenter), a legless Vietnam vet in a veterans' hospital who must save the life of Billy Johnson (Michael Boatman), his quadriplegic roommate, while still keeping his host's wife, Julie (Judith Hoag), from leaving him so that his eldest son can save a tank troop in the Gulf War. All the while, Sam is touched by the kindness and sadness of Kiki (Jennifer Aniston), a hospital volunteer whose brother is missing in action. Note: Guest star Michael Boatman coincidentally played a doctor called Sam Beckett for four seasons (1988–1991) in China Beach.
| 80 | 5 | "Killin' Time" | Michael Watkins | Tommy Thompson | Leon Stiles; June 18, 1958; Pine County, Oklahoma | October 20, 1992 | 68106 | 14.6 |
Sam leaps into Leon Stiles (Cameron Dye), a dangerous, psychopathic criminal and murderer who has taken Carol Pruitt (Connie Ray) and her young daughter, Becky (Beverley Mitchell), hostage. Meanwhile, Al must find the homicidal Stiles, who has escaped from the project waiting room, leaving Gooshie to act as a temporary Observer. Note: This episode provides a rare glimpse of the present world outside Project Quantum Leap.
| 81 | 6 | "Star Light, Star Bright" | Christopher Hibler | Richard C. Okie | Maxwell Stoddard; May 21, 1966; Charlemont, Massachusetts | October 27, 1992 | 68101 | 11.5 |
Sam is Maxwell Stoddard (Douglas Stark), an eccentric grandfather living with his son, John (Guy Boyd), and his family. He must prevent his teenage grandson, Tim (Morgan Weisser), from running away and getting caught up in the drug culture while also preventing the grandfather from being sent to a mental institution for his wild stories about UFOs. His host is being tracked by Dr. Hardy (H. Richard Greene) and Major Meadows (Michael Maguire), from Project Blue Book, culminating with their own UFO experience.
| 82 | 7 | "Deliver Us from Evil" | Bob Hulme | Deborah Pratt, Robin Jill Bernheim & Tommy Thompson | Jimmy LaMotta; March 19, 1966; Oakland, California | November 10, 1992 | 68109 | 13.9 |
Sam leaps back into Jimmy LaMotta (Brad Silverman), but is perplexed when he finds that the happy future he supposedly ensured in his previous leap is not taking place, and the marriage of his brother and sister-in-law, Frank (John D'Aquino) and Connie (Laura Harrington), is falling apart. Shortly thereafter, Sam finds something he never expected. A female quantum leaper named Alia (Renée Coleman), aided by observer Zoey (Carolyn Seymour), is apparently there to "put wrong what once went right". Note: Frank, rather than Sam, utters Sam's usual arrival exclamation of "Oh, boy!".
| 83 | 8 | "Trilogy: Part I (One Little Heart)" | James Whitmore Jr. | Deborah Pratt | Clayton Fuller; August 8, 1955; Pottersville, Louisiana | November 17, 1992 | 68105 | 12.8 |
Sam leaps into a small Louisiana town as sheriff Clayton Fuller (James Whitmore Jr.) who's also the father of 10 year old Abigail Fuller (Kimberly Cullum), a girl accused by local townswoman Leta Aider (Mary Gordon Murray) of killing her husband and daughter, even though the daughter was never found and the town doctor (Max Wright) confirms the husband had a heart attack. Leta believes Abigail to be cursed, as mother Laura Fuller (Meg Foster) is in an asylum, with Abigail cared for by Fuller family housekeeper Marie (Fran Bennett). Deputy sheriff Bo (Stephen Lee) and the doctor's son, Will (Travis Fine), both help protect Abigail from Leta's attacks, though Sam must save his host and Abagail from dying in a house fire. Note: Whitmore Jr., who does double duty as Sam's host and the episode's director, also appeared in and directed season three episode "8½ Months". For the only time, this episode's leap date is the same as a previous episode, season one's "The Color Of Truth".
| 84 | 9 | "Trilogy: Part II (For Your Love)" | James Whitmore Jr. | Deborah Pratt | Will Kinman; June 14, 1966; Pottersville, Louisiana | November 24, 1992 | 68112 | 13.6 |
Sam again leaps into the life of a now-adult Abigail Fuller (Melora Hardin), this time as her soon-to-be husband, Will (Travis Fine). Will is now the town's deputy sheriff, under Bo (Stephen Lee), who became sheriff after Leta Aider (Mary Gordon Murray) started the fire that killed Sam's previous host, Clayton Fuller. Sam begins to fall for Abigail himself, and spends a night with her before the wedding. to the chagrin of former housekeeper Marie (Fran Bennett), who raised Abigail after Clayton died. Sam must save Abigail from being killed by a lynch mob led by Leta, who convinces the Takins (Wendy Robie and Christopher Curry) that their runaway child was killed by Abigail. When Sam visits Abigail's mother Laura (Meg Foster) at the asylum, she recognizes him from his visit, then as Clayton, 11 years earlier.
| 85 | 10 | "Trilogy: Part III (The Last Door)" | James Whitmore Jr. | Deborah Pratt | Larry Stanton III; July 28, 1978; Baton Rouge, Louisiana | November 24, 1992 | 68113 | 13.6 |
Sam leaps into Larry Stanton III (W.K. Stratton), a lawyer hired by Marie (Fran Bennett) to defend Abigail (Melora Hardin), currently on trial for the murder of Leta Aider, the woman who got away with killing Abigail's father (Sam's then host) after she accused Abigail of killing her husband and daughter twenty-three years earlier. Abigail's marriage to Will never took place, though she has a daughter, Samantha Jo Fuller (Kimberly Cullum, who played young Abigail in Part I), from the night with Sam, as Will, 11 years earlier. When Sam visits Abigail's mother Laura (Meg Foster) at the asylum, she again recognizes him from his two previous visits, as two other hosts. Secrets are revealed, the family history comes unraveled, and surprises are in store for Sam as he discovers the heritage behind Samantha Jo. Note: Parley Baer, who played a doctor in the season three episode "8½ Months", guest stars as the judge.
| 86 | 11 | "Promised Land" | Scott Bakula | Gillian Horvath & Tommy Thompson | Willie Walters; December 22, 1971; Elk Ridge, Indiana | December 15, 1992 | 68110 | 11.5 |
Sam leaps into his hometown as Willie Walters (Daniel Engstrom), one of three brothers who are robbing the local bank in order to pay off a loan. Sam must uncover the reason the bank lent money to these farmers who could not possibly pay it back, while trying to prevent the brothers from being killed when they try to escape. Note: Scott Bakula plays a dual role in this episode, also appearing as Sam's father, John Beckett. This was the third and final episode of QL directed by Scott Bakula himself.
| 87 | 12 | "A Tale of Two Sweeties" | Christopher Hibler | Robin Jill Bernheim | Marty Elroy; February 25, 1958; Pompano Beach Airpark, Florida | January 5, 1993 | 68118 | 9.8 |
Sam leaps into traveling salesman Marty Elroy, a bigamist who is unexpectedly greeted at the Miami airport by both of his unsuspecting wives, Rachel and Ellen, and their respective children--two each. Ziggy believes that Sam is supposed to choose one wife for Marty to spend his life with, but only provides a 50% chance of picking the right family. Al advises Sam to decide after spending time with both women. Marty is also a degenerate gambler, owing $2000 to an emotionally complex bookie, Vic. Sam juggles Marty's wives and evades Vic for several days, eventually voiding his debt with a successful longshot bet, while Al prevents Marty and Rachel's daughter Jessica, who is young enough to see him, from running away. Sam confesses Marty's bigamy to Rachel and Ellen, who leave him and bond with each other over Marty's faults. History changes; both women have happier lives without Marty, and Marty himself lives a more respectable life thereafter. Just before Sam leaps out, Marty is greeted by yet a third wife and their son and daughter.
| 88 | 13 | "Liberation" | Bob Hulme | Chris Abbott & Deborah Pratt | Margaret Sanders; October 16, 1968; Connecticut | January 12, 1993 | 68108 | 10.3 |
Sam leaps into Margaret Sanders, a housewife who must convince her husband George (Max Gail) that their family can survive and even thrive with feminism. He must also persuade daughter Suzanne (Megyn Price) to choose a nonviolent, different from movement leader Diana St. Cloud (Deborah Van Valkenburgh), to achieve advances for women. Sam also persuades a woman working in George's firm to be more assertive about her ideas for the company, earning a promotion and full compensation.
| 89 | 14 | "Dr. Ruth" | Stuart Margolin | Robin Jill Bernheim | Ruth Westheimer; April 25, 1985; Manhattan, New York | January 19, 1993 | 68114 | 10.7 |
Sam leaps into famous sex doctor Ruth Westheimer in the middle of her radio call-in show. Sam must help Annie (Robyn Lively), one of her callers, stand up to the sexual harassment of her boss, Jonathan (James McDonnell). The situation escalates, with Sam having to stop Jonathan from raping Annie. Sam also carries out his original mission, getting Dr. Ruth's radio coworkers, Doug (Peter Spears) and Debbie (Anita Barone), into a lasting relationship. Back in the PQL's waiting room, Dr. Ruth helps Al deal with his fear of abandonment (raised in an orphanage, divorced by Beth) and his inability to tell Tina that he loves her. Note: This episode marks the only time that Sam leaps into two women in a row and the only time the Leapee is seen being replaced in the waiting room at the conclusion of the episode.
| 90 | 15 | "Blood Moon" | Alan J. Levi | Tommy Thompson | Lord Nigel Corrington; March 10, 1975; Outside of London, England | February 9, 1993 | 68117 | 10.8 |
Sam leaps into an eccentric artist named Lord Nigel Corrington, who lives a strange, Gothic lifestyle. He must deal with Al's conviction that Sam's host is a hundreds-year-old vampire, while trying to keep Corrington's potentially walking dead acolytes, Victor (Ian Buchanan) and Claudia (Deborah Moore), from killing his host's new wife, Alexandra (Shae D'lyn), as a blood sacrifice. Note: In keeping with the possibility that his host is a vampire, who does not have a reflection (the usual way that the host is shown during an episode), actor Robert MacKenzie does not appear onscreen as Sam's host, Corrington. MacKenzie did appear, in the PQL waiting room, at the end of the previous episode.
| 91 | 16 | "Return of the Evil Leaper" | Harvey Laidman | Richard C. Okie | Arnold Watkins; October 8, 1956; North Falls, New York | February 23, 1993 | 68124 | 11.5 |
As nerdy college kid Arnold Watkins (Tristan Tait), who dresses up as a superhero named the Midnight Marauder, Sam must stop Mike Hammond (Neil Patrick Harris) from operating dangerous chicken races as part of his fraternity's initiation ritual. In the PQL waiting room, Al must convince Sam's host to give up his dangerous lifestyle and help him deal with witnessing the murder of his parents. However, the sudden return of Evil Leaper Alia (Renée Coleman), and her observer Zoey (Carolyn Seymour), makes the task significantly harder. Note: Because of his character's ongoing interaction with Al in the PQL waiting room, as compared to the brief appearance of hosts in most episodes, actor Tristan Tait is credited as a guest star in the opening credits.
| 92 | 17 | "Revenge of the Evil Leaper" | Debbie Allen | Deborah Pratt | Elizabeth Tate; September 16, 1987; Mallard, Ohio | February 23, 1993 | 68125 | 11.5 |
Sam ends up leaping into Elizabeth Tate (Cynthia Steele), an inmate in a women's prison, accompanied by Alia (Renée Coleman), who has leapt into fellow inmate Angel Jensen. With Alia having been extracted from the evil project, former observer Zoey (Carolyn Seymour), who is the new Evil Leaper, accompanied by new observer Thames (Hinton Battle), leaps into the prison's warden (Sam Scarber), as Alia had been traced there before contact was lost. Sam must help Alia escape all contact with the evil project, while keeping his host from being falsely executed for the murder of a fellow inmate. With help from honest guard Vivian (Barbara Montgomery), to whom Sam reveals the truth of his and Alia's situation, Alia is able to escape for good. Note: Set in 1987, this is the most advanced date of any leap shown during the series. This episode was directed by actress Debbie Allen, who earlier directed and guest-starred as Joanna Chapman in the 3rd-season episode "Private Dancer".
| 93 | 18 | "Goodbye Norma Jean" | Christopher Hibler | Richard C. Okie | Dennis Boardman; April 4, 1960; Hollywood, California | March 2, 1993 | 68115 | 13.1 |
Sam is Dennis Boardman (Stephen Bowers), the chauffeur of Marilyn Monroe (Susan Griffiths), and must help the unhappy star stay alive to make one final movie. Things are complicated when new live-in assistant, Barbara Whitmore (Liz Vassey), uses Marilyn to further her own acting career, by trying to steal her final role.
| 94 | 19 | "The Beast Within" | Gus Trikonis | John D'Aquino | Henry Adams; November 6, 1972; Washington state | March 16, 1993 | 68122 | 10.0 |
Sam is Henry Adams (Mike Jolly), a Vietnam War veteran living in the forest with Roy (Sean Sullivan), an epileptic fellow veteran who will die unless he gets his medicine. However, he is opposed in this task by Luke (Pat Skipper), the local sheriff, who served in the same unit and doesn't want to face his past. Luke is married to Karen (Eileen Seeley), war widow of the fourth member of the onetime high school friends. Sam's efforts are complicated when Karen's adolescent son, Daniel (David Tom), heads into the woods in an effort to prove that Bigfoot really exists.
| 95 | 20 | "The Leap Between the States" | David Hemmings | Richard C. Okie | John Beckett; September 20, 1862; Mansfield County, Virginia | March 30, 1993 | 68121 | 11.8 |
Breaking all the rules of Quantum Leaping, Sam leaps along his own genetic line and finds himself in the American Civil War as his great-grandfather, Union Army Captain John Beckett (Rob Hyland). Sam must win the heart of his great-grandmother, southerner Olivia Barrett Covington (Kate McNeil), or he may be erased from existence. Sam must also help Olivia and her slave, Isaac (Michael D. Roberts), as they hide the stop they are operating on the Underground Railroad from Confederate Lieutenant Montgomery (Geoffrey Lower). Sam's success, on all fronts, leads Olivia and Isaac to abandon her plantation, with Isaac proudly declaring that he is adopting the surname King, which Ziggy reveals makes him Martin Luther King Jr.'s great-grandfather.
| 96 | 21 | "Memphis Melody" | James Whitmore Jr. | Robin Jill Bernheim | Elvis Presley; July 3, 1954; Memphis, Tennessee | April 20, 1993 | 68123 | 10.1 |
As a young Elvis Presley (played by Michael St. Gerard), Sam must help a struggling female musician named Sue Anne Winters (played by Mary Elizabeth McGlynn), but at the same time must ensure that he does not prevent the king of rock 'n' roll from being discovered. Guest star: Gregory Itzin This episode contains Quantum Leap's final "Kiss With History", the series' famous running gag. Just before Sam takes the talent show stage, the act before him is a seven-year-old kid with sunglasses and a saxophone, who's introduced as "Little Billy C, all the way from Hope, Arkansas!", implying that the kid is then-new president Bill Clinton.
| 97 | 22 | "Mirror Image" | James Whitmore Jr. | Donald P. Bellisario | Himself; August 8, 1953; Cokeburg, Pennsylvania / April 3, 1969; San Diego, California | May 5, 1993 | 68126 | 20.6 |
In the series finale, Sam arrives at a mining town as himself on the date and exact hour he was born. Patrons of the town bar look familiar from past leaps, but with different names, while one (W. Morgan Sheppard) even has the same name and bad breath as Gooshie – but has a reflection revealing to Sam that he is also a leaper. Al the bartender (Bruce McGill) takes everything in his stride, even when Stawpah (Stephen McHattie), who helps Sam save two miners, leaps out without leaving a host behind, and is only remembered by him and Sam. Sam theorizes that the bartender might be God. Al the bartender denies being God, then tells Sam that he controls his own leaps and could return home whenever he wants. Al Calavicci eventually locates Sam, but is unable to shed any light on the situation. He does, however, confirm that Stawpah is a figure from his own past. As much as he wants to go home, Sam decides to revisit Al's wife, Beth (Susan Diol), and tell her that Al is still alive. Al and his wife remain together and have four daughters, while Sam never returns home. Guest stars: In addition to McGill, who appeared in the pilot episode, other returning actors include J.D. Daniels and Michael Bellisario ("A Tale of Two Sweeties"), John D'Aquino and Brad Silverman ("Jimmy"), Richard Herd ("Future Boy"), Dan Butler ("Southern Comforts"), and Mike Genovese ("Double Identity").
