= List of Quantum Leap (1989 TV series) characters =

The following is a list of characters from the sci-fi/drama Quantum Leap, created by Donald P. Bellisario.

== Main characters ==
=== Dr. Samuel Beckett ===
- Dr. Samuel Beckett (Scott Bakula) – The mastermind behind Project Quantum Leap who leaps back and forth within his own lifetime, putting things right that once went wrong. See main article for more.

=== Admiral Albert Calavicci ===
- Rear Admiral Albert Calavicci (Dean Stockwell) – Sam's right-hand man who appears in the form of a hologram that only Sam can see and hear. Born in 1934 to an Italian father and Russian mother, he grew up in an orphanage. He joined the United States Navy and became a Rear Admiral. He was a womanizer, married several times, and was abusing alcohol when he met and befriended Sam Beckett on the Starbright Project. Sam helped Al turn his life around, and Al became Sam's constant companion and source of support, thinking of creative solutions to problems. In the revival, Al is mentioned to have died in 2021, in reference to Stockwell's death in real life.

=== Ziggy ===
- Ziggy (voiced by Deborah Pratt) – The supercomputer Sam designed to run Project Quantum Leap. The computer has a feminine personality and a massive ego; the latter feature is an accomplishment Sam is particularly proud of, as it makes Ziggy much more than a simple number-crunching machine. In early episodes, it is suggested that Ziggy is the computer's operator. But when Sam speaks to Ziggy directly, it shows that Ziggy is a self-operating computer who is capable of recognizing and expressing human emotions. Ziggy is programmed with historical information through Sam's life and has access to outside databases, and is able to project the likely effect of Sam's actions on history. While Al is with Sam, he gets information from Ziggy through a faulty handheld device. Al can get information from Ziggy through this device, or by simply asking out loud (Al sees whatever location Sam is in as a holographic projection and is always physically in close proximity to Ziggy).

== Recurring characters ==
=== Project Quantum Leap ===
- Dr. Donna Eleese (Teri Hatcher, age 19 / Mimi Kuzyk, age 45) – Born Donna Wojohowitz, she is Sam's wife and director of Project Quantum Leap in her husband's absence. Originally, Donna was not involved with the project, until Sam altered history, thus ensuring her involvement and getting rid of the Committee (see below).
- Dr. Irving "Gooshie" Gushman (Dennis Wolfberg) – Project Quantum Leap's head computer programmer and senior operations coordinator. A quirky man, Gooshie is often described as "a little guy with bad breath". He is the butt of jokes between Sam and (especially) Al. When he is seen, he tends to be in a state of worry due to Sam's present situation. Gooshie once filled in for Al as Sam's holographic contact when Al was busy attempting to track down a murderer who escaped the waiting room.
- Dr. Verbena Beeks (Candy Ann Brown) – The project's head psychiatrist. It is her job to work directly with the person Sam displaces when he leaps as they are often in a state of shock and panic when they arrive.
- Tina Martinez (Gigi Rice) – Tina is a medical technician that works on the Project. No one can enter the Imaging Chamber or the Accelerator Chamber without first being inspected by her. She is Al's girlfriend and is also having a secret affair with Gooshie. In the episode where Sam accidentally erased Al from existence, she was married to Gooshie.
- Edward St. John V (Roddy McDowall) – When Sam changed history and accidentally erased Al from existence, Edward St. John V appeared as his holographic contact. After correcting the error, Al reappeared. Whether or not St. John works on the Project outside of that alternate timeline is unknown.
- Samantha Josephine "Sammy Jo" Fuller (Kimberly Cullum, age 11) – Project technician who works on the project. She is the biological daughter of Sam and Abigail Fuller, conceived during a leap into Abigail's fiancé in 1966. Only the child-version of Sammy Jo is ever seen. Sammy Jo spends her life believing that Abigail's former fiancée is her biological father, and she is never told anything different. Sam figures out that Sammy Jo is his daughter, and Al confirms this through Ziggy. Child Sammy Jo resembles Abigail at the same age, but with Sam's hair colour. She has a fascination with time travel and has a photographic memory, and bonds easily with Sam. Sam has no memory of meeting adult Sammy Jo, even though she works on the project with him. Ziggy's prediction that Sam will forget this secret when he has his next leap comes true. This means that only Al knows the truth about Sammy Jo's parentage.
- Senator (Warren Frost) – The head of a government oversight committee that tried to shut down Project Quantum Leap when Sam failed to stop the downing of a U-2 spy plane.
- Senator Diane McBride (Alice Adair) – Although he failed to stop the U-2, Sam did change history and Senator Diane McBride became the head of the oversight committee and ruled to continue the Project's funding. Al witnesses the former Senator change into Diane. He immediately realizes that this was the result of Sam changing the timeline, but is the only person who is aware of it. He never mentions what he witnessed to anyone.
- The Committee – Led by men named Weitzman and Bartlett, the committee oversaw Project Quantum Leap until Sam altered history, bringing Donna onto the Project, assuring government funding and eliminating the need for the Committee.

=== Friends and family ===
- John Samuel Beckett (Newell Alexander/Scott Bakula) – Sam's father, a gruff but kind dairy farmer in Elk Ridge, Indiana. He was named after his grandfather, a Civil War officer. When Sam leaps into his teenage self, he recalls that his father had died a few years later due to poor health. Sam fails in getting him to quit smoking and eat better.
- Thelma Louise Beckett (Caroline Kava) – Sam's mother. After her husband's death, she moved to Hawaii to live with her daughter and her second husband.
- Lieutenant Thomas "Tom" Beckett (David Newsom) – Sam's older brother who was killed in Vietnam on April 8, 1970, until Sam changed history and kept his brother alive. However, this resulted in Al not being rescued and being held as a prisoner of war. His first wife then believed Al to have been killed in action and moved on with another husband, not knowing that Al was trying to get back to her.
- Katherine "Katie" Beckett (Olivia Burnette) – Sam's younger sister. To get away from trouble at home, she married an abusive alcoholic named Chuck at a young age. Years later she divorced him and eventually married an Air Force officer, Lieutenant Jim Bonick. After John Beckett's death, Thelma lived with Katie and Jim.
- Beth Calavicci (Susan Diol) – Al's first wife and the only woman he ever truly loved. When Sam meets Beth during a Season 2 leap, she believes that she is widowed as her husband, who was serving in military action in the Vietnam war, had been reported missing in action and presumed dead. Al pressures Sam into stopping her forming a relationship with another man, insisting that "her husband" was still alive. Sam figures out Beth's identity and refuses to fulfill Al's request, deeming it to be selfish. In his next two leaps, Sam tries to save his own brother in the Vietnam war. This accidentally thwarts a rescue attempt that would have rescued Al, causing him to become a war prisoner. When Al is freed and returns home, he learns that Beth thought he was dead and had remarried, so he chooses to leave her alone. Sam is given a chance to put this right, and then assures Beth that her husband Al is alive and is trying to get back to her.
- Sammy Jo Fuller – Sam's daughter due to his leaping. See 'Project Quantum Leap' above.
- Captain John Beckett (Scott Bakula) – Captain John Beckett is a civil war officer and Sam's great-great grandfather. Sam leaps into him, making him the only leapee to have existed outside of Sam's own time. While he represents the North, he is taken hostage by a supporter of the Southern Army. Al confirms through Ziggy that his abductor is the Captain's future wife and Sam's great-great grandmother, who must ensure that she falls in love with the Captain. Otherwise Sam would prevent his own birth and potentially stop Project Quantum Leap from ever beginning and undoing every change Sam ever made.

=== Antagonists ===
In Season 5, Sam discovers a leaper from another project. This leaper project seems to follow the same structure and scientific principles as Quantum Leap, but is dedicated to the opposite goal of putting wrong what once went right. The participants sometimes make reference to unspecified authority figures who torture them greatly if they fail.

- Alia (Renée Coleman) – Sam's counterpart, a beautiful and deadly woman who is leaping around in time, committing terrible acts in an attempt to get home. Alia and Sam see each other as their respective leapees until they make physical contact. The first time Sam touches Alia, their genuine identities are revealed simultaneously. After meeting and failing to kill Sam twice, Alia abandons her old ways and tries to escape the ones controlling her leaping with Sam's help. At the end of "Revenge of the Evil Leaper" her leap is accompanied by a blue hue rather than her usual red hue, implying she has escaped the Evil Leaper project. It is implied that Alia was an unwilling participant in the project.
- Zoey (Carolyn Seymour) – Alia's holographic partner. She is a cruel and sadistic woman who, after Alia breaks free of their project's control on her, leaps back in an attempt to kill Alia herself. Unlike Sam and Al, Zoey is clearly in charge of her respective pairings. She manipulates Alia and cares little about her feelings. While Zoey is a hologram, she can see Sam if Alia can (due to her being tuned in to Alia's brainwaves), but Sam remains unable to see or hear her.
- Thames (Hinton Battle) – When Zoey leaped, a darkly comical man named Thames became her hologram.
- Lothos – The other project's computer system, analogous to Ziggy, though unlike her seems to have more control over his respective project and their members. Though never seen on the screen he had a rather strong influence on the Evil Leaper project as those who worked under him regarded him as knowing everything and never making mistakes. Like Ziggy however he seemed to have some sort of ego as he was capable of regret as it was said he regretted sending Alia as the Leaper and regarded it as a mistake. Lothos seemed capable of having direct control over the leapers as Zoey once claimed to Alia that he could send her "back to her worst nightmare", and Alia once feared that he himself put her in the women's prison. He also was capable of causing simultaneous torture to both Alia and Zoey through two points in time. However he was not all powerful as he was unable to stop Sam from rescuing Alia from the project, and was once Jammed from performing a search and lock due to special circumstances.

== Guest characters ==
Below is a list of all of the people displaced during Project Quantum Leap, commonly referred to as "Leapees" by fans of the show.

=== Season 1 ===
- Captain Thomas "Tom" Stratton (Layne Beamer) – Air Force test pilot on a program to break faster than Mach 3. Appeared in "Genesis Part 1" and first half of "Genesis Part 2".
- Timothy "Tim" Fox (Tim Martin) – A minor league baseball player near the end of his career. Appeared in the second half of "Genesis Part 2"
- Dr. Gerald Bryant (John Tayloe) – A once-respected English Lit. professor having an affair with one of his students. Appeared in "Star-Crossed".
- Clarence "Kid" Cody (Michael Strasser) – A professional boxer on the take from the mafia.
- Dr. Daniel Young (Sloan Fischer) – A large animal veterinarian in rural Texas.
- Frankie La Palma (Page Moseley) – A handsome Mafia hitman.
- Geno Frascotti (Michael Genovese) – A feared Mafia don.
- Jesse Tyler (Howard Matthew Johnson) – A black chauffeur/houseman to a wealthy, elderly Southern woman.
- Cameron Wilson (Scott Menville) – A teenaged gearhead.
- Nick Allen (Tony Heller) – A private investigator in love with his late partner's wife.

=== Season 2 ===
- A firefighter – A firefighter rescuing an old woman's cat from a tree.
- Lieutenant Thomas "Tom" McBride (Ron Chabidon) – A New York police detective on his honeymoon to Niagara Falls.
- Chad Stone (Kevin Light) – A professional movie stuntman.
- Charlie MacKenzie (Bill Arnold) – A recently discharged sailor returning home with a Japanese war bride.
- Samantha "Sam" Stormer (LaReine Chabut) – A professional secretary at a Detroit automotive manufacturing company.
- Andrew Ross (Bill Burdin) – A blind classical concert pianist.
- Chick Howell (Douglas Ibold) – A deejay at a rock-n-roll radio station.
- Rabbi David K. Basch (John J. Reiner) – A rabbi trying to guide his family through a difficult time.
- James "Jimmy" LaMotta ‡ (Brad Silverman) – A dockworker with Down syndrome.
- Leonard Dancey (Travis Michael Holder) – A lawyer defending a black woman accused of murdering her white lover.
- Raymond "Ray" Hutton (Michael Carl) – An actor traveling with a road show of Man of La Mancha.
- Dr. Timothy Mintz (Donald P. Bellisario) – A paranormal researcher investigating a possible haunting.
- Knut "Wild Thing" Wileton (Jeff Benson) – A college student, fraternity president and all-around party animal.
- Linda Bruckner (Molly Meeker) – A real estate agent and single mother.
- Eddie Vega (Corey Smith) – A high school football quarterback.
- Peter Langly (Mark Marigian) – An FBI Agent guarding a federal witness.
- George Washakie (Jim Jaimes) – A Native American man who is on the run with his dying grandfather.
- Melvin Spooner (Marvyn Byrkett) – A mortician/coroner investigating the death of a young woman.
- Charlie "Black Magic" Waters (Robert "Rags" Woods) – An ageing professional pool shark.
- Victor Panzini (Ted Nordblum) – A performer in a once-famous aerial act.
- "Buster" (Jay Boryea) – A bouncer helping his girlfriend kidnap a baby.
- Phillip Dumont (Kent Phillips) – A man trying to win back his ex-wife from her mafia fiancé.
- Detective Jacob "Jake" Rawlins (Doug Bauer) – A San Diego narcotics detective.

=== Season 3 ===
- Sam Beckett (Adam Affonso) – Sam's 16-year-old self.
- Herbert "Magic" Williams (Christopher Kirby) – Navy SEAL stationed in Vietnam.
- Father Frank Pistano (Bud Sabatino) – A recently ordained Catholic priest.
- Karl Granson (Danny McCoy, Jr.) – A professional fashion photographer.
- Joshua Rey (Chris Ruppenthal) – A horror novelist.
- Darlene Monty (Theresa Ring) – Miss Sugar Belle, a contestant in the Miss Deep South pageant.
- Raymond "Ray" Harper (Garon Grigsby) – A black medical school student with a white girlfriend.
- Harry Spontini (Dan Birch) – A professional magician fighting for custody of his daughter.
- Shane "Funny Bone" Thomas (Kristopher Logan) – A member of a roving motorcycle gang.
- Reginald Pearson (Milan Nicksic) – The personal assistant to a ruthless businessman.
- "Butchie" Rickett (Buff Borin) – A 13-year-old boy on vacation with his family.
- Billie Jean Crockett (Priscilla Weems) – A pregnant teenager estranged from her father.
- Kenny Sharpe (Matt Marfoglia) – An actor on the children's television series Time Patrol.
- Rod McCarty (Chris Solari) – A performer with the Chippendales dance company.
- Joey DeNardo (Sam Clay) – A lounge musician working under the name Chuck Danner.
- Gilbert LaBonte (Richard White) – The owner and proprietor of the LaBonte Quilting and Sewing Academy (a front for a brothel).
- Jeffrey "Tonic" Mole (Bruce Michael Paine) – The lead singer of a glitter rock band, King Thunder.
- Gordon O'Reilly (Ken Kells) – A professional bounty hunter.
- Jesus Ortega (Stephen Domingas) – A death row inmate.
- Terry Sammis (Jeff Hochendoner) – A wrestler performing under the name Nikolai Russkie.
- Eddie Elroy (Patrick M. Bruneau) – A college student and part-time atom bomb shelter salesman.
- Sam Bederman – A depression patient at a mental hospital.

=== Season 4 ===
- Captain Thomas "Tom" Jarret ^{1} (Dean Denton) – A recently liberated WWII prisoner of war.
- A stand-up comic – An entertainer working the Catskills dealing with a bitter custody hearing.
- Lester Fuller (Owen Rutledge) – A minor league baseball player trying to get back into the majors.
- Archie Necaise (Bob Hamilton) – A police deputy working in a town in the path of a hurricane.
- Clyde (Glenn Edden) – A civil servant and recent inductee into the Ku Klux Klan.
- Frank Bianca (Robert Jacobs) – A professional hairdresser born Maurice Liptschitz.
- Katie McBain (Cheryl Pollak) – A rape victim.
- Bobo (a chimpanzee) – A chimpanzee in the early stages of Project Mercury.
- Detective Jack Stone (David Garrison) – A police detective working on a gruesome murder investigation.
- William "Billy" Beaumont (Ted Baader) – A con-artist claiming that he can make rain.
- Chance Cole (Mark Kemble) – A prisoner being held past his sentence at a forced labor camp.
- Joseph "Joe" Thurlow (Will Schaub) – A young actor in a relationship with an attractive older woman.
- Thomas "Tommy" York (Beau Windham) – A Naval cadet under investigation for being a homosexual.
- Dylan Powell (Harker Wade) – An aging television reporter covering the story of a serial murder.
- Tyler Means (Paul Bordman) – A former Old West gunslinger with an old partner who has come looking for revenge.
- Cherea (Tiffany Jameson) – A member of a rhythm and blues girl group.
- Eddie Brackett (Mark McPherson) – The co-pilot of a small aircraft over the Bermuda Triangle.
- Roberto Guttierrez (Andrew Roa) – A sensationalist reporter with a bizarre talk show.
- Max Greenman (Ross Partridge) – A taxi driver ferrying a woman claiming to be an angel.
- Kyle Hart (Patrick Lowe) – A soap opera actor kidnapped by an obsessed fan.
- Dr. Dale Conway (Rodger LaRue) – An archeologist uncovering a cursed tomb in Egypt.
- Davey Parker (Rafe Battiste) – A stand-up comedian with a loud-mouthed partner.
- Ensign Al "Bingo" Calavicci (Jamie Walters) – A Naval pilot on trial for the murder of a superior officer's wife.

=== Season 5 ===
- Lee Harvey Oswald (Willie Garson) – An emotionally disturbed man believed to be the sole assassin of President John F. Kennedy.
- Clint Hill (Himself (archival photographs)) – A Secret Service agent on President Kennedy's protection detail.
- Nikos Stathatos (Socrates Alafouzos) – A sailor marooned on an island with a beautiful but shrewish heiress.
- Ronald Miller (Michael Carpenter) – A double-amputee recovering at a military hospital.
- Leon Stiles (Cameron Dye) – A serial killer holding a woman and her daughter hostage.
- Maxwell "Max" Stoddard (Douglas Stark) – An old man with a UFO fixation.
- James "Jimmy" LaMotta (Brad Silverman) – a previous Leapee with Down syndrome.
- Connie LaMotta ² (Laura Harrington) – Homemaker and sister-in-law to Jimmy LaMotta
- Sheriff Clayton Fuller (James Whitmore, Jr.) – Small town sheriff with a troubled but loving daughter.
- Deputy Sheriff William "Will" Kinman (Travis Fine) – Deputy sheriff trying to protect his fiancée from an angry mob.
- Lawrence "Larry" Stanton III (W.K. Stratton) – Lawyer defending a woman for the murder of her long-time aggressor.
- William "Willie" Walters, Jr. (Daniel Engstrom) – Part of a trio of bank robbers with a room full of hostages.
- Martin "Marty" Elroy – A traveling salesman with two wives and families on the verge of meeting.
- Margaret Sanders – A homemaker and casual participant in the Women's Liberation Movement.
- Dr. Ruth Westheimer (herself) – Famous sex therapist.
- Lord Nigel Corrington (Robert MacKenzie) – Eccentric artist and occultist believed to be a vampire.
- Arnold Watkins (Tristan Tait) – A college student moonlighting as a heroic vigilante, the Midnight Marauder.
- Dawn Taylor ² (Raquel Krelle) – A college student dating the head of a fraternity.
- Elizabeth "Liz" Tate (Cynthia Steele) – A prison inmate accused of murdering another inmate.
- Angela Jensen ² (Laura O’Loughlin) – A prison inmate accused of murdering another inmate.
- Clifton Myers ³ (Sam Scarber) – The warder of a women's prison that sexually abuses the prisoners.
- Dennis Boardman (Stephen Bowers) – Bodyguard to Marilyn Monroe.
- Henry Adams (Mike Jolly) – A Vietnam veteran living in isolation in the mountains.
- Captain John Beckett (Rob Hyland) – Sam's ancestor fighting in the Civil War.
- Elvis Presley (Michael St. Gerard) – 19-year-old amateur musician on the verge of getting discovered.

== Notes ==
‡ Sam leaped into Jimmy again at a later date.
^{1} Displaced by Al and later by Sam.
² Displaced by Alia.
³ Displaced by Zoey.
