= Sam Beckett =

Fictional character from Quantum Leap

Samuel John Beckett
- First appearance: "Genesis"; March 26, 1989
- Last appearance: "Mirror Image"; May 5, 1993
- Created by: Donald P. Bellisario
- Portrayed by: Scott Bakula

In-universe information
- Full name: Samuel Beckett
- Species: Human
- Gender: Male
- Occupation: Scientist; Time traveller
- Family: John Beckett (father, deceased); Thelma Beckett (mother); Tom Beckett (brother); Katherine Beckett (sister)
- Spouse: Dr. Donna Eleese
- Children: Samantha Josephine 'Sammy Jo' Fuller (daughter)

Dr. Samuel John Beckett is a fictional character and the protagonist on the 1989–1993 science fiction television series Quantum Leap, played by Scott Bakula.

Initially, the audience knows very little about Beckett, much as he knows little about himself due to holes in his memory dubbed the "Swiss cheese effect"—a side effect from the time travel (an effective trope to allow the writers to add to the character as the show went on). Eventually, it is revealed that Beckett is a true Renaissance Man, equally good at math and science and the arts. His skills allow him to adapt to the various situations in which he finds himself, although many of those situations still take him off guard with comical results.

Beckett tends to fall in love easily, yet be naive about women; his travelling companion Al Calavicci has playfully called him a "Boy Scout."

He also learned painful things from his past that likely inspired him to travel through time in the first place. Beckett tries to do the right thing no matter what, although when the leaps hit close to home, he tends to lose perspective and make irrational decisions; at those times, he requires Al to guide him back to the right path.

== Backstory ==
Sam Beckett was born at 12:30 p.m. EST on August 8, 1953, in (fictional) Elk Ridge, Indiana, to dairy farmer John Samuel Beckett and his wife, Thelma Louise Beckett. As a child, he had two cats, named Donner and Blitzen, but never had a dog. Sam was a child prodigy, learning to read at the age of two and do advanced calculus in his head at the age of five. By the time he was ten, he could beat a computer at chess. Sam also played piano in a concert at Carnegie Hall when he was nineteen, plays guitar, is a good dancer, sings tenor, and his favorite song is John Lennon's "Imagine". Beckett has a photographic memory, an IQ of 267, likes dry or light beer, and likes microwave popcorn. Sam also knows several kinds of martial arts and has been afraid of heights since he was nine years old.

In his teen years, Beckett's family was dealt a hard blow when his older brother, Tom, was killed in Vietnam on April 8, 1970, but Sam leaps into his brother's unit and saves him on that day. Tom (Thomas Andrew Beckett) was a good athlete, an All-State basketball player, an Annapolis graduate, is a Navy SEAL Commander, and has a wife named Mary. Sam has one sister named Katie (Katherine Elizabeth Beckett), born during a flood in 1957, whose first husband was an abusive alcoholic named Chuck. They divorced and she is now married to Navy officer Lt. Jim Bonnick. They have lived in Hawaii with Thelma Beckett since 1974. Sam's father suffered a fatal heart attack in 1974 while Sam was in college; the guilt of his absence during his family's time of need would stay with Sam for years.

Beckett graduated from high school at the age of sixteen and, following his brother's advice, attended MIT in the early 1970s. While at MIT, Sam and his mentor, Professor Sebastian LoNigro, developed a string theory of time travel ("Her Charm"; see below). Sam went through four years of MIT in two years, and continued through various colleges to eventually obtain seven doctoral degrees in music, medicine, quantum physics, archaeology, ancient languages, chemistry, and astronomy, but not psychiatry or law. In the pilot episode, Sam is told he only has six doctorates; this was later retconned to seven. He speaks six modern languages including English, Spanish, French, Russian, German, and Japanese, but not Italian or Hebrew. He knows four extinct languages, including Egyptian hieroglyphics. He is proficient in martial arts such as Judo, Karate, Muay Thai, and Taekwondo. He has won a Nobel Prize for physics, which he remembers during one leap ("Disco Inferno"). For this, TIME called him "the next Einstein".

One of the few things that Sam cannot do is cook; two of his onscreen attempts at this, in the episodes "Another Mother" and "Good-bye, Norma Jean" failed humorously, as did his attempt at baking in "Liberation." He did, however, cook a meal for the colleagues of the husband of the woman he leaps into in "Liberation," and there was nothing to suggest that it was anything other than a normal meal that everybody ate with no problems. No one ate the breakfasts he made in "One Strobe Over the Line," "What Price Gloria?" or "Liberation." He was able to make chitlins with Al's help in "The Color of Truth," but it is not shown whether or not anyone ate them.

As a young adult in the 1980s, Sam was a key member of the Starbright Project (details on the nature of the project were not revealed on the show), where he would meet some of his closest and most trusted friends: Al Calavicci, a decorated naval officer; a brilliant computer programmer known simply as Gushie; and Dr. Donna Eleese, the love of Sam's life, whom he met in 1984. Five years after the Starbright Project, Sam and Donna were engaged, but Sam was jilted at the altar on June 5, 1989, and never saw Donna again.

On Sam's third leap, he meets Donna years before their actual engagement. Realizing that Donna's damaged relationship with her father is the reason why she can never commit to a relationship (as her father left her, she subconsciously feels that any man she meets will inevitably abandon her and thus prevents them from doing so by leaving them first), Sam drives Donna out to reconcile with her father so that she might get some closure. We learn later in the episode "The Leap Back" that as a result of this, Donna never leaves Sam at the altar, and they are married to this day.

However, before "The Leap Back" Sam has no current memory of Donna and his marriage. The reason for this is twofold. First, Sam's "Swiss cheesed" brain caused him amnesia in regard to his marriage. Second, Donna understood that in some cases, in order for Sam to successfully leap, it would be necessary for Sam to have romantic encounters with various women. In order to spare the "choir-boy" Sam mental anguish (it is established that, unlike Al, Sam takes vows of marriage very seriously) and to facilitate his leaping, Donna forbids Al or anyone else from alerting Sam that he is married.

A few months later in 1989, Sam and Al spearheaded Project Quantum Leap, a time travel experiment based on the string theory Sam had developed while at MIT. The PQL facility was located in Stallion's Gate, New Mexico, in a primarily underground complex. In 1995, after constructing the necessary machinery, including a holographic imaging chamber and a supercomputer ("Ziggy") with access to vast historical databases, the project's funds were running thin. Eager to prove his theories, Sam prematurely stepped into the nuclear accelerator chamber and propelled himself back in time.

== Time traveller ==
In the pilot episode, Sam awoke in 1956, having exchanged places in time with an Air Force test pilot. He is startled to see a stranger in the mirror as he prepares to shave. Others also see Sam as the person he displaced. As Sam would soon discover, quantum-leaping had an unforeseen side-effect: He was struck with partial amnesia; he describes his own situation with the analogy of his brain being like a hunk of Swiss cheese, with his memory full of holes and lacking some personal information about his past, the most consistently absent detail being his marriage to Donna (with Donna preferring that Sam not be reminded of their marriage so that he can more easily commit to the people his hosts are in love with and thus solve whatever he is there to accomplish, consoling herself about Sam's 'cheating' by reasoning that his amnesia means that he is not technically cheating on her but is the equivalent of a man unaware that someone else is in love with him).

To lead Sam and the audience from this confusion comes Al, an observer from Sam's own time, except Al has to convince Sam he is not a hallucination but a hologram tuned to Sam's brainwaves that only Sam can see and hear, but convincing an amnesiac he is real is difficult. Al conveys to Sam a theory to return Sam to the present: that an unknown influence (God, Fate, or Time) was using Sam to correct a mistake in the past — in this case, saving the life of the pilot Sam had displaced, who was killed in an experimental aircraft in the original history.

When Sam corrected the timeline, he leapt forward, but not all the way home; this time, he found himself assuming the identity of a minor-league professional baseball player named Tim Fox. For the rest of his life (an epilogue in the series finale tells us Sam never gets home, but in our terms, it was for the next four years/five seasons, the duration of the show) that Sam would continue to travel back and forth through time, swapping identities with various people and as a tagline for the show reiterated, "setting right what once went wrong."

== Dr. Beckett's string theory ==
Sam's theory of time travel, developed with Professor LoNigro, is based on an expanding, but finite, universe. A person's life is like a length of string; one end represents birth, the other represents death. If one were to tie the ends of the string together, their life becomes a loop. Next, by balling the loop together, the days in one's life would touch one another out of sequence. Therefore, jumping from one part of the string to another would allow someone to travel back and forth within his own lifetime, thus making a "quantum leap" between each time period. (How exactly these things are accomplished is never explained, but it has been suggested that this theory borrowed heavily from van Strickum's closed timelike curve.)

Keeping this principle in mind, Sam's leaps were generally limited to periods within his own lifetime; he could not leap to a date prior to his birth or into his own future. There were, however, a few exceptions. In "The Leap Back," Sam switched places with Al, who leaped back into 1945, and later in the episode was able to leap himself back into Al's place in the past. The explanation was that the simo-leap with Al had left Sam with enough of Al's genetic coding that he could leap back past his own lifetime (since it was still within Al's). In "The Leap Between the States," Sam was able to leap outside of his own lifetime and found himself in the American Civil War in the life of his great-grandfather; the explanation was that Sam's close genetic link with his ancestor allowed him to do this. This was also partly due to an "error" that was referenced and then corrected by Ziggy, implying that Sam would not be able to pull off a similar feat again and was once more limited to his own timeline.

Two early episodes, "Play It Again, Seymour" (which took place on April 14, 1953) and "The Americanization of Machiko" (which took place on August 4, 1953) had Sam leaping into dates prior to the date later given as his birthday, August 8, 1953. Although these would appear to be continuity errors on the part of the show, creator Donald P. Bellisario has proffered the explanation that Sam's life dates from his conception rather than his actual birth, and thus dates such as these which are less than nine months prior to August 8, 1953, would be valid leap dates. However, once Sam's proper birthday is established, there are no further leaps prior to that date aside from the exceptions mentioned above.

Al explains the string theory in the pilot episode, and Sam, recovering his memory of the theory, explains it to Donna in the second episode, "Star-Crossed." This theory is later revealed to have been relayed to by the leaped Sam Beckett to an actor and would-be time traveller Moe Stein in "Future Boy" (whose original theory was simply connect the beginning and end of one's life) who explains the full version on his television show in response to a viewer question from young Sam Beckett who, at that time, was still a child living in Indiana; only his own lack of resources prevented Moe from creating Project Quantum Leap decades before Sam.

== Changes in his own life ==
Though explicitly forbidden by his own guidelines to alter the past for his own benefit, Sam did alter his own history and those of his loved ones on a number of occasions:

- In the second episode of the series, "Star-Crossed", Sam reunited the 19-year-old version of his future fiancée, Donna, with her estranged father (while unknowingly exposing the Watergate Scandal). Sam will later learn (season four, see below) that Donna's fears of being abandoned by the people she cared for never became an issue, resulting in her not leaving Sam at the altar, and the couple was married. This change combines with the changes in the season two premiere (see below) to save Project Quantum Leap (PQL). Sam's marriage to Donna brings her onto PQL and, through her father's military connections, assures government funding, thus replacing the Project's private funding oversight committee with a government oversight committee.
- In the second-season premiere "Honeymoon Express", the government oversight committee tried to shut down PQL by rejecting its multibillion-dollar annual budget. In an attempt to prove that Sam had leaped, Al tried to get Sam to prevent the downing of the U-2 since he leaped in two days before the event. Sam was unable to prevent the U-2 mission, but by saving the life of a young woman and subsequently helping her pass her legal exams, he saved the PQL when the same woman becomes the Senator leading the government oversight committee that now approves the Project's budget.
- In the second season closing episode "M.I.A.", Al tried to get Sam, who leaps into a San Diego police detective in 1969, to save Al's first marriage (to Beth) by stopping Beth from remarrying when she thinks Al has died in Vietnam. This nearly costs the life of the man Sam was really there to save, the partner of his leapee, since Al had missed running other scenarios through Ziggy to confirm Sam's true mission. In the end, Sam leaped, but was unable to save Al's marriage (until later—see final bullet below).
- In the third-season premiere "The Leap Home (Part 1)", Sam leaped into himself as a teenager in his hometown Elk Ridge, Indiana, in 1969 to win a basketball game his team originally lost (the victory will allow his coach to go on to become a professional coach while also giving two of his teammates the chance to go to college on the subsequent scholarships). While there, he tried unsuccessfully to save the lives of his father and brother (his father being destined to die of a heart attack by 1974 and his brother during a mission in Vietnam), but Al suggested that, in the end, he was only there to have an opportunity to say goodbye to them. On Sam's very next leap ("The Leap Home (Part 2)"), he found himself in his brother Tom's SEAL unit in Vietnam. While there, Sam saved his brother's life. Sam missed a chance to free a young Al and two other POWs from their Viet-Cong captors, although Al assured him that he understood due to Sam ensuring that photo evidence proving Al was still alive would come back to the government.
- In the fourth-season premiere "The Leap Back", Sam and Al exchanged places as Leaper and Observer, leaving Al in 1945, apparently on the very day of his birth, and finally returning Sam to PQL's laboratory. The leap back allows Sam to realize (leaping keeps some facts muddled for him) that he and Donna (see first bullet in this section) are married. When Al is incapacitated in the past, Sam once again enters his time machine to exchange places with Al.
- In the fifth-season episode "Trilogy (Part 2)," Sam fathers a child who proves to be his true genetic child, not the child of his Leapee. Samantha Josephine 'Sammy Jo' Fuller, like Sam, is a child prodigy with an eidetic memory. She would grow up to join the staff of PQL, never knowing that Sam is her true father.
- In the series finale "Mirror Image", Sam learned the truth that he was, and had always been, the one in control of his journey through time (albeit only via his subconscious mind up to this point). Sam then returned to a specific point in time, to reveal his true self to Al's first wife, Beth, while assuring her that Al was alive as a POW in Vietnam who would return to her.

== Finale ==
As stated above, in the final episode of the show Sam learned from a bartender named Al (played by Bruce McGill, who also appeared in the first episode as a different character) that Sam was in control of his leaps and could have returned home whenever he wanted. The bartender reminded Sam that he created Project Quantum Leap to help the world, and that in each leap he changed people and events for the better. Although Sam wanted to go home, he instead chose to return and inform Beth that Al was still alive. The final caption of the show tells the audience that, in the end, Sam never returned home; with the title card at the end somewhat unceremoniously announcing it, and also with his last name misspelled: "Dr. Sam Becket [sic] never returned home." Several episodes of the 2022 revival confirm that Sam is lost in time, though the Project was restarted by Herbert "Magic" Williams, one of Sam's previous leapees, with the hopes of eventually bringing Sam home.
