= Quantum Leap season 1 =

Quantum Leap
- Season 1
- DVD cover
- No. of episodes: 9

Release
- Original network: NBC
- Original release: March 26 – May 17, 1989

Season chronology
- Next → Season 2

The first season of Quantum Leap ran on NBC from March 26 to May 17, 1989. The series follows the exploits of Dr. Sam Beckett and his Project Quantum Leap (PQL), through which he involuntarily leaps through spacetime, temporarily taking over a host in order to correct historical mistakes. Season one, a late-season replacement, consists of nine episodes.

The pilot episode, "Genesis (pt. 1)", won the series its first of three consecutive Primetime Emmy Awards for Outstanding Cinematography, while the episode "Double Identity" earned a Creative Arts Emmy Award for Outstanding Achievement in Hairstyling for a Series.

== Episodes ==
| No. overall | No. in season | Title | Directed by | Written by | Leap details (Name, date & location) | Original release date | Prod. code | Viewers (millions) |
|---|---|---|---|---|---|---|---|---|
| 1 | 1 | "Genesis" | David Hemmings | Donald P. Bellisario | Tom Stratton; September 13, 1956; Edwards Air Force Base, Blockfield, California / Tim Fox; Summer 1968; Waco, Texas | March 26, 1989 | 83549 | 23.3 |
| 2 | 2 | "Genesis" | David Hemmings | Donald P. Bellisario | Tom Stratton; September 13, 1956; Edwards Air Force Base, Blockfield, California / Tim Fox; Summer 1968; Waco, Texas | March 26, 1989 | 83549 | 23.3 |
Dr. Sam Beckett, desperate to prove his time travel theory before his top secret Project Quantum Leap (PQL) runs out of funds, leaps before the kinks are worked out of the machine. He ends up leaping into Tom Stratton (Layne Beamer), the pilot of the experimental Bell X-2 aircraft, trying to act as Tom while dealing with his own "Swiss cheese" memory. Sam corrects an aerial incident that killed Tom, then helps Tom's pregnant wife, Peggy (Jennifer Runyon), from having to lose the baby. Ziggy, the super computer Sam designed for PQL, believes that fulfilling these tasks will allow Sam to leap home. Instead, Sam leaps into minor league baseball player Tim Fox (Ken Martin) in Texas at the end of the 1968 season, right in the middle of a game, where he must make the winning play in order to leap further. Notes: 1) Sam, starting a tradition seen in nearly every episode (exceptions noted throughout these synopses), utters the phrase "Oh, boy!" when he first realizes that he has leapt into a new situation.; 2) For the first of only two times in the series (with season 4's "The Leap Back"), Ziggy is able to connect with Sam to try, unsuccessfully, to bring him home.; 3) Despite his "Swiss cheese" memory, Sam surprises himself by knowing the exact medical procedure to save the baby, later learning that medicine is just one of his six doctorates and that Time "called him the next Einstein".; 4) Originally shown as a feature-length pilot TV movie, which was later cut into two separate episodes for syndication.
| 3 | 3 | "Star-Crossed" | Mark Sobel | Deborah Pratt | Gerald Bryant; June 15, 1972; Marion, Ohio | March 31, 1989 | 65003 | 15.7 |
As Dr. Gerald Bryant (John Tayloe), a lecherous English Literature professor at a private university, Sam's mission is to stop young student Jamie-Lee (Leslie Sachs) from ruining her life by entering into an ill-advised marriage with Sam's host, but along the way, Sam tries to change his own history by reuniting student Donna Eleese (Teri Hatcher), who will be a fellow PhD quantum physicist when she leaves him at the altar when they are 30, with her father before he ships out to Vietnam. Note: Something Sam did in this leap has resulted in Donna Eleese not jilting him at the altar, though he only remembers their marriage when he briefly leaps back to her at Project Quantum Leap, in season 4's "The Leap Back".
| 4 | 4 | "The Right Hand of God" | Gilbert Shilton | John Hill | Clarence "Kid" Cody; October 24, 1974; Sacramento, California | April 7, 1989 | 65002 | 12.0 |
Sam is Clarence "Kid" Cody (Michael Strasser), a crooked boxer who must win the championship legitimately in order to win the money that his new managers, kindly nuns Sisters Angela (Michelle Joyner) and Sarah (Nancy Kulp) – who received his contract from a deceased parishioner – need to build a new chapel. Sam must achieve this while saving his host from retribution by Jake Edwards (Guy Stockwell), the gangster paying him to cheat, and also keeping the promise to his host's girlfriend, Dixie (Teri Copley), of a better future for them.
| 5 | 5 | "How the Tess Was Won" | Ivan Dixon | Deborah Arakelian | Daniel "Doc" Young; August 5, 1956; Texas | April 14, 1989 | 65004 | 14.2 |
Sam leaps into Daniel "Doc" Young (Sloan Fischer), a veterinarian in rural Texas. He and Al must figure out if he is there to prove that a piglet does not have a disease that will require a cull of all the pigs, or win the love of Tess McGill (Kari Lizer), a hands on rancher whose father, Chance (Lance LeGault), pushes her to marry a cowboy and inherit his 50,000 acre ranch. Sam saves the pig, while helping a marriage-reluctant Tess and ranch hand Wayne (Marshall R. Teague) realize they love each other. As it turns out, Sam does not leap until he helps his host's young assistant, Buddy Holly (Scott Fults), to make a breakthrough on a song he is writing.
| 6 | 6 | "Double Identity" | Aaron Lipstadt | Donald P. Bellisario | Frankie LaPalma/ Geno Fescotti; November 8, 1965; Brooklyn, New York | April 21, 1989 | 65001 | 9.8 |
Sam leaps into Mafia hitman Frankie LaPalma (Page Moseley), right in the middle of a tryst with Teresa Pacci (Terri Garber), former mistress of Mafia don Geno Fescotti (Mike Genovese). Geno knows Teresa is seeing someone, and orders his man, Adriano (Mark Margolis), to find and kill the suitor. The team at PQL tries to bring Sam home, requiring Sam to cause the Northeast Blackout of 1965 in order to eliminate background signals. This leaps Sam into Geno, just before he kills Frankie; Sam, as Geno, gives his public blessing for Teresa and Frankie to marry and orders Frankie to leave the Mafia business. However, this was not his real mission.
| 7 | 7 | "The Color of Truth" | Michael Vejar | Deborah Pratt | Jesse Tyler; August 8, 1955; Red Dog, Alabama | May 3, 1989 | 65013 | 15.0 |
Sam leaps into Jesse Tyler (Howard Matthew Johnson), an aging black chauffeur in the segregated South. He must save his wealthy white employer, Melny Trafford (Susan French), the elderly widow of the former Governor of Alabama, from getting hit by a train, while also persuading her to play a more active role in the civil rights movement. When the sheriff’s son (Michael Kruger) seriously injures Sam's host's granddaughter, Nell (Kimberly Bailey), by forcing her car off the road, Melny makes the whites-only hospital treat the girl. Al has his first experience being noticed by a human other than Sam, although Melny only perceives him as the ghostly voice of her husband, when Al convinces her to stop before the train incident.
| 8 | 8 | "Camikazi Kid" | Alan J. Levi | Paul Brown | Cameron "Cam" Wilson; June 6, 1961; Los Angeles, California | May 10, 1989 | 65014 | 18.4 |
Sam leaps into Cameron "Cam" Wilson (Scott Menville), a high school nerd who must prevent his sister Cheryl (Romy Windsor) from marrying the abusive alcoholic Bob Thompson (Kevin Blair), an incident that reminds Sam of the fate of his own sister. When Bob lies to Cheryl that they will join the Peace Corps after their wedding, Sam challenges him to a car race for pinks, knowing that Bob will show his true self when beaten. Sam gets help from Jill (Holly Fields), his host's nascent girlfriend and fellow car nerd, in enhancing his car for a successful win that exposes Bob's abuse. Sam does not leap until he (his host) kisses Jill for the first time.
| 9 | 9 | "Play It Again, Seymour" | Aaron Lipstadt | Story by : Donald P. Bellisario, Scott Shepard & Tom Blomquist; Teleplay by : Donald P. Bellisario & Scott Shepard | Nick Allen; April 14, 1953; New York City, New York | May 17, 1989 | 65009 | 14.6 |
Sam leaps into New York City private investigator Nick Allen (Tony Heller), who looks remarkably like Humphrey Bogart and is looking for the murderer of his partner, Phil Grimsley, in a world akin to a Bogart film. The femme fatale of the piece is his partner's wife, Allison (Claudia Christian). Sam is aided in his efforts by Seymour (Willie Garson), the newsstand boy in his host's office building, which is managed by Lionel (Paul Linke). Sam remembers having read a pulp detective novel about the case, which Ziggy tracks down in order to help Sam out. The book reveals that Sam's host was murdered at LaGuardia Airport, and Al learns that Allison and Seymour disappeared, all in the next 24 hours. At LaGuardia, when an adolescent Woody Allen mistakes Sam for Bogart, Sam spots a delusional Lionel – who killed Phil, believing Allison wants to run off with him. Sam stops Lionel from killing the trio, but does not leap until he inspires Seymour to become a pulp novelist. Note: This is the first of two episodes where Sam leaps into a host after his own conception but before his own birth, revealed in the series finale to be August 8, 1953, four months after the date in this episode. This differs from the two episodes ("The Leap Back" and "The Leap Between The States") which contradicted the show's construct of Sam leaping within his lifetime, though the reasons for those events are explicitly explained in both those episodes. The end of the episode shows the leap-in for "What Price Gloria", however that episode was actually aired as the fourth of the second season.
