= Quantum Leap season 4 =

Quantum Leap
- Season 4
- DVD cover
- No. of episodes: 22

Release
- Original network: NBC
- Original release: September 18, 1991 – May 20, 1992

Season chronology
- ← Previous; Season 3 Next → Season 5

Season four of Quantum Leap ran on NBC from September 18, 1991 to May 20, 1992. The series follows the exploits of Dr. Sam Beckett and his Project Quantum Leap (PQL), through which he involuntarily leaps through spacetime, temporarily taking over a host in order to correct historical mistakes. Season four consists of 22 episodes.

For his work this season, Scott Bakula won the Golden Globe for Best Actor – Television Series Drama.

== Episodes ==
No. overall	No. in season	Title	Directed by	Written by	Leap details (Name, date & location)	Original release date	Prod. code	Viewers (millions)
54	1	"The Leap Back"	Michael Zinberg	Donald P. Bellisario	Tom Jarrett; June 15, 1945; Crown Point, Indiana / Himself; September 18, 1999; Stallions Gate, New Mexico	September 18, 1991	67303	21.2
Sam and Al switch roles after a lightning strike. This allows Sam to return home to his wife, Dr. Donna Eleese (Mimi Kuzyk) – whom he had forgotten as a side effect of leaping. Al leaps into Captain Tom Jarrett (Dean Denton), returning home after three years in a Nazi P.O.W. camp, and is set to be killed by the jealous ex-fiancé (Robert Prescott) of his hometown sweetheart, Suzanne (Amanda Wyss). Sam must act as his hologram in order to save Al and continue to leap through time. Note: Leaping to the Quantum Leap facility in 1999 allows the oft-mentioned Gooshie (Dennis Wolfberg), Tina (Gigi Rice) and Ziggy (a computer) to be seen.
55	2	"Play Ball"	Joe Napolitano	Tommy Thompson	Lester "Doc" Fuller; August 6, 1961; Galveston, Texas	September 25, 1991	67305	16.2
Sam leaps into washed-out baseball pitcher Lester "Doc" Fuller (Owen Rutledge), who has to get back to the major leagues. Instead, he helps Chucky Myerwich (Neal McDonough), a younger and angrier pitcher, because Chucky reminds Sam of Al when they first met. Al worries that Sam will get stuck as Doc if he gives up, in favor of Chucky, the chance to pitch when a major league scout watches their big game.
56	3	"Hurricane"	Michael Watkins	Chris Ruppenthal	Archie Necaise; August 17, 1969; Jackson Point, Mississippi	October 2, 1991	67306	14.8
Sam leaps into Archie Necaise (Bob Hamilton), a small-town sheriff in the midst of Hurricane Camille. He must keep his host's girlfriend, Cissy (Marilyn Jones), from being killed, either by the storm, or by anyone else.
57	4	"Justice"	Rob Bowman	Toni Graphia	Clyde; May 11, 1965; Alabama	October 9, 1991	67309	15.4
Sam leaps into a young man named Clyde (played by Glenn Edden) just as he is about to be inducted into the KKK, out of respect for the racist family he has married into. He must prevent Black civil rights leader Nathaniel from being lynched by the Klan, as well as trying to explain to his host's son the evils of racism. Due to Sam's upbringing, he finds it very difficult to act like the person he has leaped into in order to "act behind enemy lines". Note: Michael Beach and Glenn Morshower also guest star.
58	5	"Permanent Wave"	Scott Bakula	Beverly Bridges	Frank Bianca; June 2, 1983; Beverly Hills, California	October 16, 1991	67302	15.2
Sam is Frank Bianca (Robert Jacobs), a hair stylist living with his girlfriend, Laura (Doran Clark), and her son Kyle (Joseph Gordon-Levitt). When Kyle witnesses the murder of a mall drugstore clerk just as Sam leaps in, Laura won't let him tell the police what he saw, and the killer is getting closer and closer to make sure that he never will. Note: This is Scott Bakula's directorial debut. He later directed two other episodes, this season's "Roberto" and season 5's "Promised Land".
59	6	"Raped"	Michael Zinberg	Beverly Bridges	Katie McBain; June 20, 1980; Mill Valley, California	October 30, 1991	67312	16.6
Sam leaps into Katie McBain (Cheryl Pollak), a young woman who has just been raped by the town's All-American boy (Matthew Sheehan). He must work with the prosecutor (Penny Peyser), herself a rape victim, to make sure that justice is done. To ensure Katie's testimony is accurate, she is brought into the Imaging Chamber to testify (relayed by Sam) at the rapist's trial. Note: Unlike most episodes, Pollak, who plays the "leapee", has an ongoing role, and thus is included in the opening credits.
60	7	"The Wrong Stuff"	Joe Napolitano	Paul Brown	Bobo the chimp January 24, 1961; Cape Canaveral, Florida	November 6, 1991	67308	14.4
In a very bizarre, out-of-human host, Sam leaps into Bobo, a chimpanzee whom he must get into the space program, with the help of Dr. Ashton (Caroline Goodall), who manages the Astro-chimp program. If not, Bobo will die in a meaningless helmet test run by Dr. Winger (Gary Swanson), whose method is based on an incorrect hypothesis. Note: This is the only episode where Sam does not leap into a human being.
61	8	"Dreams"	Anita W. Addison	Deborah Pratt	Jack Stone; February 28, 1979; Malibu, California	November 13, 1991	67320	13.9
Sam leaps into a cop named Jack Stone (David Garrison) just as he finds a dead woman, her frightened children, and their father preparing to kill himself. Sam must uncover a childhood trauma of Jack's (which has unfortunately entered Sam's head throughout this leap), find the connection between Jack, the victim, and their shared psychiatrist (Alan Scarfe), before his host becomes the next victim.
62	9	"A Single Drop of Rain"	Virgil W. Vogel	Story by : Richard C. Okie, Donald P. Bellisario & Ralph Meyering, Jr. Teleplay by : Richard C. Okie	William "Billy" Beaumont; Clover Bend, Texas; September 7, 1953	November 20, 1991	67317	16.2
Sam is William "Billy" Beaumont (Ted Baader), a traveling rainmaker returning to his hometown as it's suffering from a drought. While Billy's mother (Anne Haney) and sister-in-law Annie (Phyllis Lyons) are glad he is home, his no-nonsense brother Ralph (Patrick Massett) fears Billy will break the town's hope. Sam has to make it rain while also preventing Annie from running away with Billy.
63	10	"Unchained"	Michael Watkins	Paris Qualles	Chance Cole; November 2, 1956; Talawaga County, Mississippi	November 27, 1991	67314	17.4
Sam is Chance Cole (Mark Kemble), an escaped convict chained to Jasper (Basil Wallace), a black man wrongly accused of robbery and murder. The two escape together only to be recaptured. Sam must find a way to prove Jasper's innocence, made difficult by Boss Cooley (J.C. Quinn), the corrupt head guard who is behind the string of robberies.
64	11	"The Play's the Thing"	Eric Laneuville	Beverly Bridges	Joseph "Joe" Thurlow; September 9, 1969; New York City	January 8, 1992	67301	16.7
Sam leaps into Joseph "Joe" Thurlow (Will Schaub), a 25-year-old man who's dating the much older Jane Lindhurst (Penny Fuller). Al tells him that his mission is to get through a nude version of Hamlet, which will be his host's career breakthrough, but Sam is more interested in convincing Jane not to move back to Cleveland with her straight-arrow son (Daniel Roebuck) and daughter-in-law (Anna Gunn).
65	12	"Running For Honor"	Bob Hulme	Bobby Duncan	Thomas "Tommy" York; June 11, 1964; Near Lakeside, Macomb County, Michigan	January 15, 1992	67319	17.1
Sam leaps into Thomas "Tommy" York (Beau Windham), an honor-roll cadet leader at a naval college who might be gay. His roommate, Phillip Ashcroft (Sean O'Bryan), was kicked out of the Naval Academy for being gay, so Sam must stop Phillip from being killed by Ronnie Chambers (Anthony Palermo), leader of a bigoted gang of cadets.
66	13	"Temptation Eyes"	Christopher Hibler	Paul Brown	Dylan Powell; February 1, 1985; San Francisco, California	January 22, 1992	67322	16.9
As a rash of serial murders take place in San Francisco, Sam leaps into television reporter Dylan Powell (Harker Wade), and must prevent Tamlyn Matsuda (Tamlyn Tomita), a psychic who is helping the police, from becoming the next victim. But when she discovers who Sam really is, they fall for each other and the ordeal becomes very personal. Al helps Sam catch a killer, but the serial killer remains on the loose, so Sam and his host's cameraman, Ross Tyler (James Handy), continue to pursue the story. Note: The song that was played when the episode originally aired, "I Want to Know What Love Is" by Foreigner, topped the Billboard Hot 100 during early February 1985, when the episode is set.
67	14	"The Last Gunfighter"	Joe Napolitano	Story by : Sam Rolfe; Teleplay by : Sam Rolfe & Chris Ruppenthal	Tyler Means; November 28, 1957; Coffin, Arizona	February 5, 1992	67318	13.1
Sam is Tyler Means (Paul Bordman), an elderly retired gunfighter who's living with his family in an Old West town that is used for tourism and films. He must face his former partner, Pat Knight (John Anderson), who wants to kill Sam because his host stole his heroic antics for his own, while also preventing his host's grandson, Stevie (Sean Baca), from spiralling into a life in prison after his image of his grandfather is ruined.
68	15	"A Song for the Soul"	Michael Watkins	Deborah Pratt	Cherea; April 7, 1963; Chicago, Illinois	February 26, 1992	67304	12.2
Sam leaps into Cherea (Tiffany Jameson), a member of an all-girl teenage R&B trio, and must prevent her friend Lynelle (Tamara Townsend) from ruining the girls' futures by signing a debilitating contract with local hustler Bobby Lee (Eriq La Salle), while maintaining a relationship between Lynelle and her preacher father (Harrison Page).
69	16	"Ghost Ship"	Anita W. Addison	Donald P. Bellisario & Paris Qualles	Eddie Brackett; August 13, 1956; Bermuda Triangle	March 4, 1992	67307	14.6
Sam leaps into Eddie Brackett (Mark McPherson), the co-pilot of an air taxi that is transporting two young newlyweds, one of whom (Carla Gugino) is very sick with appendicitis, while also helping the pilot, Capt. Cooper (Scott Hoxby), overcome PTSD. But that is the least of his worries when the plane flies into the Bermuda Triangle and he loses contact with Al.
70	17	"Roberto!"	Scott Bakula	Chris Ruppenthal	Roberto Gutierrez; January 27, 1982; Destiny, New Mexico	March 11, 1992	67326	14.5
Sam is Roberto Gutierrez (Andrew Roa), a Geraldo Rivera-inspired talk-show host who works with his co-worker, Jani Eisenberg (DeLane Matthews), to unmask a local fertilizer and pesticide plant that is researching and producing chemical weapons before they're silenced. Note: Doctor Laura Schlessinger appears as herself, as a guest on an episode of the Roberto! talk-show.
71	18	"It's a Wonderful Leap"	Paul Brown	Story by : Danielle Alexandra; Teleplay by : Danielle Alexandra & Paul Brown	Max Greenman; May 10, 1958; New York City	April 1, 1992	67324	15.4
Sam is a New York City taxi driver named Max Greenman (Ross Partridge) who's trying to earn enough money to get his and father, Lenny (Jerry Adler), their own taxi medallion. Along the way, his cab runs over Angela (Liz Torres), who is completely unhurt. Angela claims to be an angel and can see Al, pretending to believe him to be the devil. Note: Scott Bakula's future Star Trek: Enterprise costar, Vaughn Armstrong, has a cameo role as Fred Trump and in the episode there also appears a young actor who plays his son Donald.
72	19	"Moments to Live"	Joe Napolitano	Tommy Thompson	Kyle Hart; May 4, 1985; Los Angeles, California	April 8, 1992	67325	18.0
Sam leaps into Kyle Hart (Patrick Lowe), a soap opera actor who is kidnapped by obsessive fan Norma Pilcher (Kathleen Wilhoite), who wants him to father a baby for her and her infertile husband, Hank (Pruitt Taylor Vince). In the original history, Hart ended up wandering the countryside with a gunshot wound to the head, rendering him a total amnesiac.
73	20	"The Curse of Ptah-Hotep"	Joe Napolitano	Chris Ruppenthal	Dr. Dale Conway; March 2, 1957; Saqqara, Egypt	April 22, 1992	67328	15.3
Sam leaps into Dr. Dale Conway (Rodger LaRue), an Egyptology professor who, along with Dr. Ginny Will (Lisa Darr) has just unearthed the tomb of the Pharaoh Ptah-Hotep. The third partner in the archeological dig, Dr. Mustafa El Razul (John Kapelos) of the Luxor Museum, arrives just after the first of a series of mishaps begin. Al reports that the team disappeared and their discovery was never reported. Did the terrible curse on the tomb wall come true?
74	21	"Stand Up"	Michael Zinberg	Deborah Pratt	Davey Parker; April 30, 1959; Glendale, Arizona	May 13, 1992	67315	13.9
Sam leaps into a man named Davey Parker (Rafe Battiste), who's part of a trio comedy act, with Mack MacKay (Bob Saget) and Frankie Washarskie (Amy Yasbeck), who are so in love with each other that they cannot face it. Sam must get the couple to see that they love each other, and prevent Mack from being killed by mobster Carlo Degorio (Robert Miranda), who has his eyes set on Frankie.
75	22	"A Leap for Lisa"	James Whitmore, Jr.	Donald P. Bellisario	Al "Bingo" Calavicci; June 25, 1957; San Diego Naval Air Station, California	May 20, 1992	67329	16.8
Sam leaps into Ensign Al "Bingo" Calavicci (Jamie Walters) who is on trial for the rape and murder of the wife of Commander Riker (Charles Rocket). The older Al is so preoccupied talking with his younger self, he fails to warn Sam of actions which unintentionally prevents his married girlfriend, Lt. Lisa Sherman (Terry Farrell), from providing young Al's alibi before she dies. When holographic Al disappears, replaced by Edward St. John V (Roddy McDowall), Sam realizes that Project Quantum Leap now exists in an alternate future in which Al was executed in the gas chamber.
