= Quantum Leap season 3 =

Quantum Leap
- Season 3
- DVD cover
- No. of episodes: 22

Release
- Original network: NBC
- Original release: September 28, 1990 – May 22, 1991

Season chronology
- ← Previous; Season 2 Next → Season 4

Season three of Quantum Leap ran on NBC from September 28, 1990 to May 22, 1991. The series follows the exploits of Dr. Sam Beckett and his Project Quantum Leap (PQL), through which he involuntarily leaps through spacetime, temporarily taking over a host in order to correct historical mistakes. Season three consists of 22 episodes.

The episode "The Leap Home (Part 2) - Vietnam" won the series its third of three consecutive Primetime Emmy Awards for Outstanding Cinematography, while the episode "The Leap Home (Part 1)" earned a Creative Arts Emmy Award for Outstanding Makeup for a Single-Camera Series.

== Episodes ==
No. overall	No. in season	Title	Directed by	Written by	Leap details (Name, date & location)	Original release date	Prod. code	Viewers (millions)
32	1	"The Leap Home (Part 1)"	Joe Napolitano	Donald P. Bellisario	Sam Beckett; November 25, 1969; Elk Ridge, Indiana	September 28, 1990	66401	12.1
Sam leaps into himself as a 16-year-old boy (Adam Logan) on Thanksgiving 1969, and Al tells him he is there to win a basketball game that served as a turning point in many people's lives, but Sam wants to take the opportunity to prevent his sister (Olivia Burnette) from marrying an abusive alcoholic, his father from dying of a heart attack, and his brother (David Newsom) from getting killed in Vietnam. Note: Scott Bakula plays a dual role in this episode, also appearing as Sam's father, John Beckett.
33	2	"The Leap Home (Part 2) – Vietnam"	Michael Zinberg	Donald P. Bellisario	Herbert "Magic" Williams; April 7, 1970; Vietnam	October 5, 1990	66402	12.9
Sam leaps into Herbert "Magic" Williams (Christopher Kirby), a U.S Combat Swimmer in his brother Tom's UDT/SEAL platoon during the Vietnam War, where he is given another chance to keep Tom (David Newsom) from dying, but runs into complications from news photographer Maggie (Andrea Thompson) and serious consequences for a close friend. Notes: 1) This is Sam's first leap out of the United States. 2) Tia Carrere and Patrick Warburton also guest star. 3) The character Herbert "Magic" Williams would later appear in a main role in the 2022 revival series, with Ernie Hudson replacing Christopher Kirby.
34	3	"Leap of Faith"	James Whitmore Jr.	Story by : Nick Harding, Karen Hall & Tommy Thompson; Teleplay by : Tommy Thompson	Francis "Frank" Pistano; August 19, 1963; Philadelphia, Pennsylvania	October 12, 1990	66408	13.9
Sam leaps into Father Francis "Frank" Pistano (Bud Sabatino), a priest who must help prevent a fellow man of the cloth (Sandy McPeak) keep his faith and self-control.
35	4	"One Strobe over the Line"	Michael Zinberg	Chris Ruppenthal	Karl Granson; June 15, 1965; New York City	October 19, 1990	66409	12.1
As fashion photographer Karl Granson (Danny McCoy Jr.), Sam must protect a fashion model (Marjorie Monaghan) from overdosing on amphetamines imposed on her by her manager (Susan Anton).
36	5	"The Boogieman"	Joe Napolitano	Chris Ruppenthal	Joshua Rey; October 31, 1964; Coventry, Maine	October 26, 1990	66410	12.6
Sam leaps into horror novelist Joshua Rey (Chris Ruppenthal) on Halloween, and finds himself surrounded by mysterious deaths. Al and Ziggy are not predicting the deaths, and Sam needs to prevent the strangulation of Joshua's fiancé Mary (Valerie Mahaffey), but Sam is running out of time and suspects, while the only clues are messages detailing the deaths on a typewriter. Notes: 1) Set in Maine, Sam inadvertently gives Joshua Rey's young budding author friend, Stevie (a.k.a. Stephen King), plot ideas for a number of King's future best sellers. 2) The theme of an evil entity being upset that Sam is undoing its evil deeds is revisited in the season 5 story arc of the Evil Leaper, starting with "Deliver Us From Evil". 3) The 2nd Handlink makes its first aired appearance on the show. (A strange occurrence if Sam only dreamed about it)
37	6	"Miss Deep South"	Christopher T. Welch	Tommy Thompson	Darlene Monte; June 7, 1958; Louisiana	November 2, 1990	66406	12.7
Sam leaps into Darlene Monte (Theresa Ring), a beauty pageant contestant who must protect a naive fellow contestant, Connie (Heather McAdam), and prevent her from ruining her life by posing for nude photographs. In the process, he must ensure that his host places at least third in the pageant so that she can win a scholarship and become a doctor.
38	7	"Black on White on Fire"	Joe Napolitano	Deborah Pratt	Ray Harper; August 11, 1965; Watts, Los Angeles, California	November 9, 1990	66403	12.6
Sam leaps into Ray Harper (Garon Grigsby), an African-American medical student engaged to the white Susan (Corie Henninger) on the day of the Watts riots. He must prevent Susan from being killed, while persuading her that they need to stay in Watts. Notes: Marc Alaimo and C.C.H. Pounder also guest star. Pounder later became Bakula's co-star on NCIS: New Orleans.
39	8	"The Great Spontini"	James Whitmore Jr.	Cristy Dawson & Beverly Bridges	Harry Spontini; May 9, 1974; Oakland, California	November 16, 1990	66412	11.8
Sam leaps into a traveling amateur magician named Harry "The Great" Spontini (Dan Birch), and must perform some real magic to prevent his host from losing custody of his young daughter (Lauren Woodland) to his ex-wife (Amy Steel), as well as to save the girl from performing a dangerous trick that will go wrong. Note: Al breaks the 1st Handlink in this episode and it's never seen again.
40	9	"Rebel Without a Clue"	James Whitmore Jr.	Story by : Nick Harding & Paul Brown; Teleplay by : Randy Holland & Paul Brown	Shane "Funny Bone" Thomas; September 1, 1958; Near Big Sur, California	November 30, 1990	66407	13.0
Sam leaps into biker Shane "Funny Bone" Thomas (Kristopher Logan), and soon meets a truck stop restaurant owner (Theodore Wilson) who lost his son to the Korean War and an idealistic young woman (Josie Bissett) who is going to die unless she gives up her reckless dream of living the hard life of Jack Kerouac. Note: Diedrich Bader and Mark Boone Junior also guest star.
41	10	"A Little Miracle"	Michael Watkins	Story by : Sandy Fries; Teleplay by : Sandy Fries & Robert A. Wolterstorff	Reginald Pearson; December 24, 1962; New York, New York	December 21, 1990	66414	11.2
Sam leaps into Reginald Pearson (Milan Nicksic) on Christmas Eve, the personal valet to Scrooge-like industrialist Michael Blake (Charles Rocket). Blake is bent on demolishing a Lower Manhattan mission, despite the pleas of Salvation Army Captain Laura Downey (Melinda McGraw), forcing Sam and Al to show him his fate in an attempt to change his mind. Because his "neurons and mesons are on a frequency close to" Sam's, Blake can clearly see and hear Al.
42	11	"Runaway"	Michael Katleman	Paul Brown	Butchie Rickett; July 4, 1964; Carbon County, Wyoming	January 4, 1991	66405	13.0
Sam leaps into Butchie Rickett (Buff Borin), a 13-year-old boy on a cross-country road trip with his family for the summer, from which Butchie's mother (Sandy Faison) will soon disappear, while also dealing with the assertiveness of the father (Sherman Howard) and the bullying of the older sister (Ami Foster).
43	12	"8½ Months"	James Whitmore Jr.	Deborah Pratt	Billie Jean Crockett; November 15, 1955; Claremore, Oklahoma	March 6, 1991	66421	17.9
Sam leaps into Billie Jean Crockett (Priscilla Weems), a pregnant teenager being cared for by local woman Dottie (Lana Schwab), who needs to keep her baby and obtain the support of her father (James Whitmore Jr.), a fact made all the more confusing by the fact that Sam seems to be pregnant even though he lacks the 'equipment' to carry a child. Notes: Parley Baer also guest stars, as the local doctor. Anne Haney guest stars as Cassy Thailer, the adoption counselor.
44	13	"Future Boy"	Michael Switzer	Tommy Thompson	Kenny "Future Boy" Sharp; October 6, 1957; St. Louis, Missouri	March 13, 1991	66417	17.0
Sam leaps into Kenny "Future Boy" Sharp (Matt Marfoglia), an actor on a children's sci-fi show, and must work quickly to keep his eccentric co-star, Moe Stein (Richard Herd), from being killed when his grown daughter (Debra Stricklin) commits him to a mental institution because of his "wild" theories about traveling in time. In the process, Sam learns, much to his surprise, that Stein has independently come up with Sam's own 'string theory' of quantum leaping, due to Sam having written a 1957 letter to Stein asking about the string theory' of quantum leaping.
45	14	"Private Dancer"	Debbie Allen	Paul Brown	Rod "The Bod" McCarty; October 6, 1979; New York City	March 20, 1991	66416	20.7
Sam is Rod "The Bod" McCarty (Chris Solari), a Chippendales dancer who must help a deaf woman (Rhondee Beriault) find success as a professional dancer, before she goes down a road of prostitution and dies of AIDS.
46	15	"Piano Man"	James Whitmore Jr.	Ed Scharlach	Joey DeNardo; November 10, 1985; Tularosa, New Mexico	March 27, 1991	66419	18.0
Sam leaps into Joey DeNardo (Sam Clay), a lounge singer in the witness protection program (hiding under the alias "Chuck Danner"), who must keep himself and his accident-prone girlfriend, Lorraine (Marietta DePrima), from being killed for a murder he witnessed three years prior. Note: at 64 months, this episode had the narrowest margin between the date the episode aired and the historical date that Sam leapt into.
47	16	"Southern Comforts"	Chris Ruppenthal	Tommy Thompson	Gilbert LaBonte; August 4, 1961; New Orleans, Louisiana	April 3, 1991	64422	15.2
Sam leaps into Gilbert LaBonte (played by Richard White), the owner of a New Orleans brothel, to prevent one of his girls, Gina (Georgia Emelin), from disappearing after a confrontation with her abusive husband, while also avoiding marriage to Gina's Aunt Marsha (Rita Taggart). Note: Diane Delano also guest stars. Lauren Tom guest stars as Sophie. David Graf guest stars as Sheriff Nolan.
48	17	"Glitter Rock"	Andy Cadiff	Chris Ruppenthal	Geoffrey "Tonic" Mole; April 12, 1974; Detroit, Michigan	April 10, 1991	64404	15.8
Sam is Geoffrey "Tonic" Mole (Bruce Michael Paine), the lead singer of a Kiss-inspired rock band who, in the original history, was murdered by an unknown assailant in a crowd. Sam must find out whether it was the manager (Peter Noone), fellow band member Flash (Jonathan Gries), a random fan, or his host's estranged son (Christian Hoff) who did it, and stop them before the deed can take place.
49	18	"A Hunting We Will Go"	Andy Cadiff	Beverly Bridges	Gordon O'Reilly; June 18, 1976; Arkansas	April 17, 1991	66424	16.5
Sam leaps into Gordon O'Reilly (Ken Kells), a bounty hunter handcuffed to a compulsively lying woman (Jane Sibbett) who is suspected of embezzling a large sum of money, and must decide whether his mission is to help the woman escape, or bring her to justice.
50	19	"Last Dance Before an Execution"	Michael Watkins	Story by : Bill Bigelow, Donald P. Bellisario & Deborah Pratt; Teleplay by : Deborah Pratt	Jesuś Ortega; May 12, 1971; Tallahassee, Florida	May 1, 1991	66423	18.3
Sam leaps into Jesuś Ortega (Stephen Domingas), a prison inmate about to be executed in the electric chair, until he is suddenly given a 48-hour reprieve to (apparently) try to prove his innocence. He is clandestinely helped by lawyer Lorrea Tearsa (Jenny Gago), from the office of the crooked DA (James Sloyan), who is intent on sentencing as many people as possible to death by withholding evidence. Note: Strapped into the electric chair, with the switch about to be thrown, Sam says "Oh, God!", rather than his usual arrival exclamation of "Oh, boy!".
51	20	"Heart of a Champion"	Joe Napolitano	Tommy Thompson	Terry Sammis ("Nikolai Russkie"); July 23, 1955; Atlanta, Georgia	May 8, 1991	66425	16.5
Sam leaps into Terry Sammis (Jeff Hochendoner), a.k.a. "Nikolai Russkie", a professional wrestler of Lithuanian origins who must prevent his brother, Ronnie (Jerry Bossard), from dying of a heart attack during their championship tag team match. Note: Terry Funk also guest stars, as one of the championship tag team opponents.
52	21	"Nuclear Family"	James Whitmore, Jr.	Paul Brown	Eddie Elroy; October 26, 1962; Homestead, Florida	May 15, 1991	66426	13.3
Sam leaps into Eddie Elroy (Patrick M. Bruneau), a college student helping his brother Mac (Timothy Carhart) sell nuclear bomb shelters during the Cuban Missile Crisis, and must prevent their neighbor (Kurt Fuller) from being shot during a false air raid.
53	22	"Shock Theater"	Joe Napolitano	Deborah Pratt	Sam Beiderman; October 3, 1954; Havenwell, Pennsylvania	May 22, 1991	66428	18.6
Sam leaps into Sam Beiderman, a depressed mental patient who receives a near-fatal session of shock therapy as soon as Sam leaps in. This causes Sam's personality to become displaced, resulting in his assuming the identities of people he has leaped into before. It's up to Al to complete Sam's mission by helping Tibby (Scott Lawrence), a mentally challenged young man, learn how to read. Al is able to do so when he discovers that he and Sam can be seen by mentally ill people. He must also find a way to restore Sam's personality so he can leap, or else risk losing contact with him forever. Note: 1) This is the only episode where it is Al, not Sam, who does a musical number. 2) Brief cameo appearances are provided by the same actors who represented people Sam leapt into in previous episodes. 3) While not a full clip show, brief clips of past episodes are interspersed.
