= Good Night, Dear Heart =

- Quantum Leap episode
- Sam Beckett prepares Hilla's body for burial.
- Episode no.: Season 2 Episode 17
- Directed by: Christopher T. Welch
- Written by: Paul Brown
- Editing by: Alec Smight
- Original air date: March 7, 1990
- Running time: 42 min

Episode chronology
← Previous "Freedom"	Next → "Pool Hall Blues"

"Good Night, Dear Heart" is a 1990 episode of the American science fiction television series Quantum Leap. Lead character Sam Beckett "leaps" (travels through time) to 1957, into the body of a mortician investigating the death of a young West German immigrant woman. What at first appears to be a suicide by drowning turns out to be foul play. The episode, the 17th of season 2, was written by Paul Brown and directed by Christopher T. Welch. It aired originally on March 7, 1990.

Paul Brown won an Edgar Award for Best Episode in a TV Series for writing "Good Night, Dear Heart". The character Stephanie Heywood was later featured in an issue of the Quantum Leap comic book series.

== Plot ==
It is November 9, 1957, and Sam Beckett has "leaped" into the body of Melvin Spooner, a mortician in fictional Riven Rock, Massachusetts, who also serves as the town's coroner. He looks down at the body of 19 year old Hilla Doehner, a West German immigrant. It is explained that Hilla has no family since her father died in North Africa in World War II and her mother and brothers perished in the 1945 firebombing of Dresden. Although it initially appears that she drowned herself, Sam determines that she was in fact murdered. He realizes that he is there to solve her murder, but grows obsessed with her.

Upon learning that Hilla was pregnant, Sam first comes to believe that Greg Truesdale, the young man who loved her, killed her. When he finds out that Greg's father Roger tried to get Hilla to have an abortion, he then tries to convince Lyle, the chief of police, to arrest Roger. Lyle persuades Sam that no prosecutor would take Roger to trial and convinces him to bury Hilla. As Sam prepares Hilla for burial he realizes who the killer is. Hilla was killed by Stephanie Heywood. Stephanie and Hilla were romantically involved and planned to move to New York together, where Hilla would model and Stephanie would become a photographer. Then Hilla fell in love with Greg and became pregnant. When she tried to break it off with Stephanie, Stephanie struck her in the head with a shoe, causing her death. After the funeral, Sam remains behind and reads the poem Warm Summer Sun by Mark Twain concluding with the words "Good night, dear heart, good night, good night" before leaping.

== Cast ==
- Scott Bakula as Dr. Sam Beckett
- Dean Stockwell as Admiral Al Calavicci
- William Cain as Roger Truesdale
- Marcia Cross as Stephanie Heywood
- Robert Duncan McNeill as Greg Truesdale
- Deborah Strang as Aggie
- W. K. Stratton as Police Chief Lyle Roundtree
- Suzanne Tegmann as Hilla
- Marvyn Byrkett as Melvin Spooner
- Hal Bokar as Groundskeeper
- Deborah Pratt as Ziggy (uncredited voice)

== Awards ==
"Good Night, Dear Heart" won an Edgar Award for writer Paul Brown for Best Episode in a TV Series.

== Comic book sequel ==
The character Stephanie Heywood was featured in "Up Against a Stonewall", the ninth issue of the Quantum Leap comic book. Sam leaps into Stephanie on June 22, 1969, as she is being released from prison for causing Hilla's death. She has continued to develop her photography skills and has secured a patron and a job as a fashion photographer in New York City. Her first model, Clarice, turns out to be a drag queen named Clement. When Clement is later arrested and beaten by police, Sam photographs him out of drag with his injuries to call attention to the abuse faced by gay and lesbian people. After being frustrated in their attempts to meet with members of the city council, Sam and friends head to the Stonewall Inn for drinks. Al warns Sam of an impending police raid and Sam realizes that he is there to document the raid and the resulting Stonewall riots, a pivotal moment in the history of the gay rights movement.

Openly gay author Andy Mangels wrote "Up Against a Stonewall". In an author's note dated September 1992, Mangels deplored the anti-gay political climate of the United States at that time, in particular the positioning of gay and lesbian Americans as "the new Willie Horton, the new Red Scare, the new boogeyman for the masses" and the then-pending ballot initiatives in the states of Colorado (Amendment 2) and Oregon (Measure 9) that would have stripped gay and lesbian people of the right even to petition for gay rights legislation in those states. Mangels criticized Quantum Leap for its portrayal of Stephanie as a lesbian killer and for the lack of positive gay portrayals on the series. Noting the series's theme of "setting right what once went wrong", Mangels wrote that "Up Against a Stonewall" was his attempt to do just that.

== See also ==
- List of 1990s American television episodes with LGBT themes
- "Flowers of Evil" - an episode of the television series Police Woman that was protested for its portrayal of lesbians
- Media portrayal of lesbianism
