= Quantum Leap (1989 TV series) =

Television series (1989–1993)

- Genre: Adventure drama; Science fiction
- Created by: Donald P. Bellisario
- Starring: Scott Bakula; Dean Stockwell
- Narrated by: Deborah Pratt (intro); Scott Bakula (episodes)
- Theme music composer: Mike Post
- Composer: Velton Ray Bunch
- Country of origin: United States
- Original language: English
- No. of seasons: 5
- No. of episodes: 97 (list of episodes)

Production
- Producers: Donald P. Bellisario; Deborah Pratt; Harker Wade
- Production location: California
- Running time: 45 minutes
- Production companies: Belisarius Productions; Universal Television

Original release
- Network: NBC
- Release: March 26, 1989 – May 5, 1993

Related
- Quantum Leap (2022 TV series)

Quantum Leap is an American science fiction television series, created by Donald P. Bellisario, that aired on NBC for five seasons, from March 26, 1989, to May 5, 1993. The series stars Scott Bakula as Dr. Sam Beckett, a physicist who, believing he has invented a way to travel through time, voluntarily subjects himself to an experiment that he believes will prove the validity of his controversial theories. Sam "leaps" into the fluid of spacetime and apparently disappears forever. However, it is soon revealed that Beckett's consciousness is alive and able to transfer to and appear to inhabit the bodies of other people existing on his timeline. The artificially intelligent computer he created, called Ziggy, operates with the assumption that in order to return home, Sam must change events in the past in order to "correct" the future course of events.

Dean Stockwell co-stars as Rear Admiral Al Calavicci, Sam's womanizing, cigar-smoking companion and best friend, who appears only as a hologram. Al is able to research the life Sam currently inhabits, providing advice when needed, and he is the only person able to see Sam when Sam has travelled through time.

The series, which combines humor, drama, romance, social commentary, and science fiction, was ranked number 19 on TV Guide's "Top Cult Shows Ever" in 2007.

A revival series, following the original show's continuity, ran on NBC from 2022 to 2024.

== Premise and characters ==
In the very near future, physicist Dr. Sam Beckett (Scott Bakula) theorizes that time travel within one's own lifetime is possible, and obtains government support to build project "Quantum Leap". Some years later, having already spent $43 billion, the government threatens to halt funding, as apparently no progress has been made. Sam then decides to test the project accelerator himself to save the project, telling no one. He is immediately thrown back in time, but upon awakening, finds that while he physically exists in the past, he appears to everyone else as a person into whom he has "leapt", and has a partial amnesia related to his own identity.

A hologram of his best friend, United States Navy Rear Admiral Al Calavicci (Dean Stockwell), appears, visible and audible only to Sam, who explains to Dr. Beckett that it appears he must fix something that "went wrong" in time. Al is aided by project Quantum Leap's artificially intelligent supercomputer, nicknamed Ziggy, who is described as a "parallel hybrid computer with a massive ego". Despite successfully changing the past in episode 1, Sam continues to leap, seemingly guided by what is eventually described as "an unknown force" "that wants him to put right events in the past that once went wrong, for reasons unknown. Thence forth, Dr. Samuel Beckett leaps from life to life and time to time, attempting to "put right what once went wrong and hoping each time that his next leap will be the leap home."

Sam and Al are the only characters to appear in every episode. The supporting characters of each episode are the friends, family, and acquaintances of the person Sam has leapt into. With a few exceptions, such as two-part or sequential episodes, these characters appear only once, though several actors have played multiple characters. Occasionally, Sam runs into real-life historical figures such as Buddy Holly, Michael Jackson, Sylvester Stallone, Donald Trump, Marilyn Monroe, and Ruth Westheimer, the last of whom played herself.

The other members of the Quantum Leap team, though mentioned often, appear in only a handful of episodes. They include head programmer Irving "Gooshie" Gushman (Dennis Wolfberg), psychiatrist Dr. Verbena Beeks (Candy Ann Brown), medical technician (and Al's lover) Tina Martinez (Gigi Rice), and Sam's wife, Dr. Donna Eleese (Teri Hatcher/Mimi Kuzyk), the project's director in his absence. The latter does not exist as Sam's wife until Dr. Beckett changes history.

== Production ==
=== Development ===
The main premise for Quantum Leap was inspired by such movies as Here Comes Mr. Jordan (1941) and Heaven Can Wait (1978), as well as the 1960s TV show, The Time Tunnel. Series creator Donald P. Bellisario saw its potential as an original anthology series, though at the time, similarly themed shows were unpopular with the major networks.

The series ran on NBC for five seasons, from March 1989 through May 1993.

=== Soundtrack ===
The theme for the series, written by Mike Post, was later rearranged for the fifth season, except for the series-finale episode, which featured the original theme music. Scores for the episodes were composed by Post and Velton Ray Bunch.

A soundtrack album was first released in 1993, titled Music from the Television Series 'Quantum Leap' , dedicated to John Anderson, who played Pat Knight in The Last Gunfighter. It was released by GNP Crescendo on CD and cassette tape.

No.	Track	Composer(s)	Length	Episode
1	Prologue (Saga Sell)	Mike Post, Velton Ray Bunch, Deborah Pratt (voiceover)	1:05	
2	Quantum Leap (Main Title)	Mike Post	1:15	
3	Somewhere in the Night	Scott Bakula	3:32	Piano Man
4	Suite from the Leap Home	Velton Ray Bunch	3:37	The Leap Home, Part 1
5	Imagine	John Lennon	3:05	The Leap Home, Part 1
6	Sam's Prayer	Velton Ray Bunch	1:52	A Single Drop of Rain
7	Blue Moon of Kentucky	Bill Monroe	1:41	Memphis Melody
8	Baby, Let's Play House	Arthur Gunter	2:13	Memphis Melody
9	Shoot Out	Velton Ray Bunch	3:03	The Last Gunfighter
10	Medley from Man of La Mancha	Scott Bakula	6:18	Catch a Falling Star
11	Bite Me	Velton Ray Bunch	3:29	Blood Moon
12	Alphabet Rap	Dean Stockwell	2:05	Shock Theater
13	Suite from "Lee Harvey Oswald"	Velton Ray Bunch	14:55	Leaping on a String
14	Fate's Wide Wheel	Scott Bakula	3:05	Glitter Rock
15	A Conversation with Scott Bakula	Scott Bakula (interview)	12:02	
16	Quantum Leap (Prologue and Main Title Reprise)	Mike Post, Velton Ray Bunch	2:20	

== Episodes ==
Season	Episodes	Originally released	
Season	Episodes	First released	Last released
1	9	March 26, 1989	May 17, 1989
2	22	September 20, 1989	May 9, 1990
3	22	September 28, 1990	May 22, 1991
4	22	September 18, 1991	May 20, 1992
5	22	September 22, 1992	May 5, 1993

=== Broadcast history ===
The Quantum Leap series, though initially scheduled to air on Friday nights, was almost immediately moved to Wednesday evenings. Later on, as the show became more successful, it was moved to Fridays. In late 1992, it began to air on Tuesdays. The series finale aired on a Wednesday in May, 1993.

The most frequent time slot for the series is indicated by italics:

- Sunday at 9:00–11:00 pm on NBC: March 26, 1989
- Friday at 9:00–10:00 pm on NBC: March 31, 1989 – April 21, 1989
- Wednesday at 10:00–11:00 pm on NBC: May 3—17, 1989; September 20, 1989 – May 9, 1990; March 6, 1991 – May 20, 1992
- Friday at 8:00–9:00 pm on NBC: September 28, 1990 – January 4, 1991
- Tuesday at 8:00–9:00 pm on NBC: September 22, 1992 – April 20, 1993
- Wednesday at 9:00–10:00 pm on NBC: May 5, 1993

In the United Kingdom, the show began on BBC Two on February 13, 1990, airing Tuesday evenings at 9:00 pm. The final episode was scheduled to be aired on June 14, 1994, but altered schedules after the death of British dramatist Dennis Potter earlier that month delayed the airing until June 21, 1994. Repeat episodes continued on the channel at various times until December 28, 1999.

==== Quantum Leap Week ====
During the summer of 1990, NBC scheduled a "Quantum Leap Week". Over the course of five consecutive nights, repeat episodes of the show were broadcast in an effort to drum up interest in the fledging series. The "Quantum Leap Week" was repeated during the summer of 1991. Each of the weekly events was supported by a series of advertisements. In each were a series of "man-on-the-street" attempting to say "Quantum Leap Week" fast, with varied levels of success.

=== Home media ===
Universal Studios has released the entire, digitally remastered, Quantum Leap series on DVD. Some controversy arose when fans discovered that many songs had been replaced from the soundtrack due to music rights issues. For the fifth season, Universal included all of the original music.

On April 13, 2016, Mill Creek Entertainment announced that it had acquired the rights to the series and re-released the first two seasons on DVD on June 7, 2016.

On February 7, 2017, Mill Creek re-released the complete series on DVD as well as Blu-ray. The release features most of the original music restored for all seasons.

Season – DVD name	Episodes	DVD release date		
Season – DVD name	Episodes	Region 1	Region 2	Region 4
Season 1 – The Complete First Season	9	June 8, 2004	November 8, 2004	May 2, 2005
Season 2 – The Complete Second Season	22	December 14, 2004	October 31, 2005	February 7, 2006
Season 3 – The Complete Third Season	22	May 10, 2005	December 12, 2005	June 7, 2006
Season 4 – The Complete Fourth Season	22	March 28, 2006	June 26, 2006	November 2006
Season 5 – The Complete Fifth Season	22	November 14, 2006	December 26, 2006	February 21, 2007
Seasons 1–5 – The Complete Series (The Complete Collection)	97	November 4, 2014	October 8, 2007	N/A

=== Final episode ===
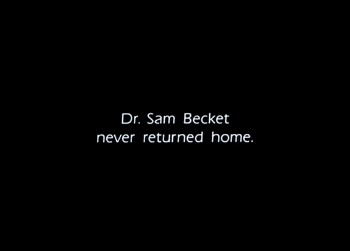
The closing title misspelled Beckett

At the end of season five, Bellisario was told to write an episode that could serve as a season finale or series finale, as it was unclear whether Quantum Leap would be renewed. The episode contained some answers to long-standing questions about the show, but contained enough ambiguity for a season six. When the show was not renewed, two title cards were attached to the end of the last episode. The first read that Al's first wife Beth never remarried, so they were still married in the present day and had four daughters. The second said Sam "never returned home." The finale was met by viewers with mixed feelings.

A few years after the airing of the finale, a script for an alternate ending was leaked on the internet. It implied that Al, through encouragement of his wife Beth, would become a leaper to go after Sam. Bellisario has said no script exists and that he does not know where this idea came from. In 2018, however, fan Allison Pregler purchased on-set publicity stills taken from season five that contained some shots of Al and Beth together; this implies that part of the alternate ending was, in fact, shot and gives credibility to the alternate-ending scenario. In May 2019, a video of the lost footage was uploaded to Reddit. Scott Bakula confirmed that several endings were shot and that the footage was authentic.

== Reception ==
The series had a slow start in the ratings, and its timeslot was moved often, but it did well in the 18–49 demographic. The finale was viewed by 13 million American households. In 2004 and 2007, Quantum Leap was ranked number 15 and 19, respectively, on TV Guide's "Top Cult Shows Ever".

=== Awards ===
Along with 43 nominations, Quantum Leap received 17 awards (listed below).

Year	Award	Category	Winner(s)	Episode
1989	Primetime Emmy Award	Outstanding Cinematography for a Series	Roy H. Wagner	"Genesis (Part 1)"
1989	Primetime Emmy Award	Outstanding Achievement in Hairstyling for a Series	Virginia Kearns	"Double Identity"
1990	Quality TV Award	Best Actor in a Quality Drama Series	Scott Bakula	
1990	Golden Globe Award	Best Supporting Actor – Series, Miniseries or Television Film	Dean Stockwell	
1990	Primetime Emmy Award	Outstanding Cinematography for a Series	Michael W. Watkins	"Pool Hall Blues"
1991	Quality TV Award	Best Actor in a Quality Drama Series	Scott Bakula	
1991	Quality TV Award	Best Supporting Actor in a Quality Drama Series	Dean Stockwell	
1991	Edgar Award	Best Television Episode	Paul Brown	"Good Night, Dear Heart"
1991	DGA Award	Outstanding Directorial Achievement in Dramatic Series	Michael Zinberg	"The Leap Home (Part 2) - Vietnam"
1991	Primetime Emmy Award	Outstanding Makeup for a Single-Camera Series	Gerald Quist; Michael Mills; Jeremy Swan	"The Leap Home (Part 1)"
1991	Primetime Emmy Award	Outstanding Cinematography for a Series	Michael W. Watkins	"The Leap Home (Part 2) - Vietnam"
1992	Quality TV Award	Best Actor in a Quality Drama Series	Scott Bakula	
1992	Golden Globe Award	Best Actor – Television Series Drama	Scott Bakula	
1993	Quality TV Award	Best Actor in a Quality Drama Series	Scott Bakula	
1993	Young Artist Award	Best Young Actress Guest-Starring in a Television Series	Kimberly Cullum	
1993	ACE Award	Best Edited One Hour Series for Television	Jon Koslowsky	"A Song for the Soul"
1993	Primetime Emmy Award	Outstanding Cinematography for a Series	Jon Koslowsky	"Lee Harvey Oswald"

== Other media ==
=== Books ===
Nonfiction

- Barrett, Julie, The A–Z of Quantum Leap. Boxtree Ltd., London 1995. ISBN 0-7522-0628-1
- Chunovic, Louis, Quantum Leap Book. Boxtree Ltd., London 1993. ISBN 1-85283-866-3
- Schuster, Hal, The Making of Quantum Leap. HarperCollins, London 1996. ISBN 0-06-105438-0
- Dale, Matt, Beyond the Mirror Image. TME Books, UK 2017. The limited edition first print hardcover was funded via Kickstarter in late 2016 and included both black & white and colored pages. Due to popular demand, the book was reprinted, though the 2nd edition did not include colored pages and came with a book jacket/dust cover.

Fiction

- Robitaille, Julie, The Beginning. Transworld Publishers|Corgi, London 1990. ISBN 0-552-13642-5. Re-published in U.K. by Boxtree Ltd., London 1994. ISBN 1-85283-392-0. (Novelization of the pilot episode)
- Robitaille, Julie, The Ghost and the Gumshoe. Corgi, London 1990. ISBN 1-85283-397-1. Re-published in U.K. by Boxtree Ltd., London 1994. (Novelization of "Play It Again, Seymour" and "A Portrait of Troian")
- McConnell, Ashley, Quantum Leap: The Novel. Ace Books, 1992. ISBN 0-441-69322-9. Re-published in the UK as Carny Knowledge. Boxtree Limited, London 1993. ISBN 1-85283-871-X
- McConnell, Ashley, Too Close for Comfort. Ace Books, 1993. ISBN 0-441-69323-7.
- McConnell, Ashley, The Wall. Ace Books, 1994. ISBN 0-441-00015-0.
- McConnell, Ashley, Prelude. Ace Books, 1994. ISBN 0-441-00076-2.
- Melanie Rawn: Knights of the Morningstar. Ace Books, 1994. ISBN 0-441-00092-4.
- Melissa Crandall: Search and Rescue. Ace Books, 1994. ISBN 0-441-00122-X.
- McConnell, Ashley, Random Measures. Ace Books, 1995. ISBN 0-441-00182-3.
- Storm, L. Elizabeth, Pulitzer. Boulevard, 1995. ISBN 1-57297-022-7.
- Henderson, C.J. and Laura Anne Gilman, Double or Nothing. Boulevard, 1995. ISBN 1-57297-055-3.
- Walton, Barbara E., Odyssey. Boulevard, 1996. ISBN 1-57297-092-8.
- Peel, John, Independence. Boulevard, 1996. ISBN 1-57297-150-9. Re-published in the U.K. as Leap into the Unknown. Boxtree Ltd., London 1996 ISBN 0-7522-0137-9.
- Storm, L. Elizabeth, Angels Unaware. Boulevard, 1997. ISBN 1-57297-206-8.
- Davis, Carol, Obsessions. Boulevard, 1997. ISBN 1-57297-241-6.
- Schofield, Sandy (Dean Wesley Smith and Kristine Kathryn Rusch), Loch Ness Leap. Boulevard, 1997 ISBN 1-57297-231-9.
- Kent, Melanie, Heat Wave. Boulevard, 1997 ISBN 1-57297-312-9.
- DeFilippis, Christopher, Foreknowledge. Boulevard, 1998 ISBN 0-425-16487-X.
- Peterman, Mindy, Song And Dance. Boulevard, 1998 ISBN 0-425-16577-9.
- Davis, Carol, and Esther D. Reese: Mirror's Edge. Boulevard, 2000 ISBN 0-425-17351-8.

=== Comics ===
Innovation Publishing produced a series of comic books that ran for 13 issues from September 1991 through August 1993. As with the television series, each issue ended with a teaser preview of the following issue and Sam's exclamation of "Oh, boy." Among the people into whom Sam found himself leaping in this series were:

Issue	Title	Person	Date
1	"First There Was a Mountain, Then There Was No Mountain, Then There Was"	High school teacher named Karen Connors in Memphis, Tennessee	March 25, 1968
2	"Freedom of the Press"	Death row inmate named Willie Jackson, who must prevent a murder on the outside	June 11, 1962
3A	"He Knows If You've Been Bad or Good ..."	Part-time Santa Claus, who goes by the name of Nick	December 20, 1963
3B	"The Infinite Corridor"	Student at MIT named Matt Randall, who is researching quantum physics	April 2, 1968
4	"The 50,000 Quest"	Contestant amid the quiz show scandals	August 15, 1958
5	"Seeing is Believing"	Newspaper reporter/columnist, who responds to a girl seeing a UFO	November 14, 1957
6	"A Tale of Two Cindys"	Teenaged girl with an identical twin sister	February 12, 1959
7A	"Lives on the Fringe"	Professional golfer with the Mafia after him	1974
7B	"Sarah's Got a Gun"	Bus driver, who discovers child abuse	May 19, 1953
8	"Getaway"	Bank robber, while the leapee tours the project with Al	1958
9	"Up Against a Stonewall"	Sequel to "Good Night, Dear Heart": Stephanie Heywood is released from prison after serving 12 years for manslaughter.	June 22, 1969
10	"Too Funny For Words"	Stand-up comedian, who befriends a fading silent movie star	June 13, 1966
11	"For the Good of the Nation"	Doctor studying the effects of LSD on human subjects	July 1958
12	"Waiting"	Gas-station attendant with a lot of time on his hands	April 24, 1958
13	"One Giant Leap"	An extraterrestrial aboard an orbiting spaceship	June 5, 1963
[14]	"Two Dweebs and a Little Monster"	Not published	

Few of the comic stories referenced episodes of the television series, with the exception of the ninth issue, "Up Against a Stonewall".

== Continuation ==
=== Proposed films ===
==== Television film ====
In July 2002, the Sci-Fi Channel (which at the time was airing reruns of the show) announced development of a two-hour television film based on Quantum Leap that would have served as a backdoor pilot for a new series, with Bellisario as executive producer.

==== Feature film ====
In July 2010 during the TV Guide panel at San Diego Comic-Con, Scott Bakula said that Bellisario was working on a script for a projected Quantum Leap feature film. Bellisario confirmed in October 2017 at the L.A. Comic Con that he had finished the script.

=== Revival ===
In January 2020, Jeff Bader, NBC's head of program planning and strategy, announced that the network was considering a reboot of Quantum Leap for the launch of its Peacock streaming service.

In January 2022, NBC greenlit a pilot episode of a Quantum Leap sixth season revival. Bellisario is involved, while the showrunners include Steven Lilien and Bryan Wynbrandt, with Deborah Pratt and Martin Gero as executive producers. The pilot will take place 30 years after the conclusion of the original series, with a new team reviving Project Quantum Leap to understand both it and the fate of Sam Beckett. Raymond Lee was signed to star in the pilot in the role of Dr. Ben Song, the person that ends up traveling back in time through the Quantum Leap project. Ernie Hudson was cast as Herbert "Magic" Williams, the lead of the new Quantum Leap program and a Vietnam War veteran whom Sam leaped into in the season three episode "The Leap Home (Part 2) – Vietnam". NBC gave the green light for a full season order in May 2022. In July 2022, it was announced that Dean Georgaris joined as showrunner. It premiered on September 19, 2022, airing on Monday nights.

In September 2022, original series star Scott Bakula confirmed that he had been asked by producers to reprise his role as Sam Beckett in the revival, but ultimately decided against it, saying in a statement on Instagram, "As the show has always been near and dear to my heart, it was a very difficult decision to pass on the project".

On April 5, 2024, it was confirmed that the series had been canceled after two seasons.

== In popular culture ==
Source Code, a 2011 science-fiction action thriller film, was directed by Duncan Jones. Jones said in reading its script that he was reminded of Quantum Leap and as a reference to the show, cast Bakula in a voice cameo role, including giving him one line of "Oh, boy" in the script.

Special episodes of Star Trek: Enterprise ("Detained", 2002) and NCIS: New Orleans ("Chasing Ghosts", 2014), both series that featured Bakula as lead, included Stockwell as a guest star to reunite the two actors from Quantum Leap. Further, "Chasing Ghosts" was directed by James Whitmore Jr., who had directed 15 episodes, and acted in three episodes, of Quantum Leap.

The 2017 episode "The Gang Turns Black" of the series It's Always Sunny in Philadelphia features numerous Quantum Leap references. When the gang finds themselves in different bodies, Sweet Dee suggests that they are "quantum leaping". Bakula has a guest appearance, as himself, supposedly researching an upcoming role, but in fact working as a retirement home custodian due to lack of residuals.

In the 2019 film Avengers: Endgame, Scott Lang brings the show up as one of many examples of time travel in fiction allowing one to change one's own past, contrasting Bruce Banner's explanation that time travel works differently in their universe.
