= Dennis Wolfberg =

American comedian and actor (1946–1994)

- Born: March 29, 1946; Long Island, New York, U.S.
- Died: October 3, 1994 (aged 48); Culver City, California, U.S.

Comedy career
- Medium: Stand up, television
- Genre: Observational comedy
- Subjects: Self-deprecation, human behavior, religion, human sexuality, education

Dennis Wolfberg (March 29, 1946 – October 3, 1994) was an American stand-up comedian and actor.

== Early life ==
Born on March 29, 1946, on Long Island to Frances and Sidney Wolfberg, Dennis attended Queens College, where he received a master's degree in clinical psychology. He was a school teacher before launching a full-time comedy career in 1979.

== Family ==
Wolfberg married fellow comedian Jeannie McBride on September 8, 1985; the couple had three sons: Daniel and twins Matthew and David.

== Comedy career ==
Wolfberg began his comedy career in New York City at the Comic Strip. Although he always wanted to be a comedian, he auditioned as a singer, playing his Martin guitar. Serendipitously, his audition piece was the Comic Strip's owner's favorite song: "American Pie." Wolfberg appeared twice on The Tonight Show. In addition, he was a frequent guest on The Merv Griffin Show, The Pat Sajak Show, and The Arsenio Hall Show. He starred in his own half-hour comedy special on HBO in 1990. He also had a recurring role as Gooshie on NBC's Quantum Leap, and in April 1993, Entertainment Tonight aired "A Day in the Life of Dennis Wolfberg," focusing on his relentless touring schedule.

He headlined at comedy clubs across the country as well as working in Las Vegas and Atlantic City on a regular basis. He was twice named America's top male comic in votes by clubgoers and owners nationwide. In 1991, he won an American Comedy Award as best male stand-up.

== Death ==
Wolfberg died of melanoma on October 3, 1994, aged 48. He had been diagnosed with cancer at least two years before his death, and he continued to work through the end of August 1994. At the time of his death, he was negotiating a deal for his own TV show.

== Filmography and TV appearances ==
- 1982 - The Clairvoyant
- 1986 - Late Night with David Letterman - guest
- 1984, 1987 - The Tonight Show Starring Johnny Carson - guest, 2 episodes
- 1989–1993 - Quantum Leap - 5 episodes
- 1990 - Teacher Teacher (TV short), Plot Outline: Wolfberg relived some of his finest moments as a teacher and proves that in a tough classroom, a good sense of humor is the most essential weapon.
- 1991 - To Tell the Truth - panelist - 5 consecutive episodes
- 2002 - Best of the Improv Volume 4
- 2007 - Comedy Club Greats
