= Christopher Magee (fighter pilot) =

United States Marine Corps aviator and journalist

Christopher Lyman Magee
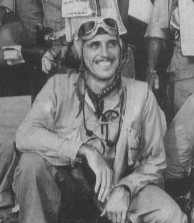
- Chris Magee of VMF-214
- Born: June 12, 1917; Omaha, Nebraska
- Died: December 27, 1995 (aged 78); Chicago, Illinois
- Burial place: Arlington National Cemetery
- Military career
- Allegiance: Canada; United States; Israel
- Branch: Royal Canadian Air Force (1941–42); United States Marine Corps (1942–45); Israeli Air Force (1948)
- Service years: 1941–1945; 1948
- Rank: Captain
- Nicknames: "CL" "Zark" "Wildman" "Maggie" "Fox"
- Units: VMF-124; VMF-214; VMF-911
- Conflicts: World War II: Solomon Islands campaign; 1948 Arab–Israeli War
- Awards: Navy Cross; Bronze Star Medal; Purple Heart
- Other work: Bootlegger, bank robber, newspaper editor

Christopher Lyman Magee (June 12, 1917 – December 27, 1995) was a United States Marine Corps aviator who became a fighter ace in World War II and was one of the more colorful members of the famous "Black Sheep" squadron, VMF-214. Known as a fearless and aggressive pilot he was credited with nine victories during the war. For his heroic actions in September and October 1943 during the Solomon Islands campaign he was awarded the Navy Cross. After the war, he dabbled in bootlegging, went to Israel and flew with the Haganah during the 1948 Arab–Israeli War and later served 8 1/2 years in federal prison for bank robberies in the Chicago area. Upon his return from prison, he lived quietly on the North Side of Chicago working as a columnist and reporter for a community newspaper. He died of surgical complications while having stomach cancer tumors removed on December 27, 1995.

== Early life ==
Magee was born in Omaha, Nebraska, in 1917 to Fred Magee and Marie nee Considine. Magee was given the same name as his great uncle Christopher Magee who was a powerful political boss in Pittsburgh, Pennsylvania, who helped run the Republican Party machine that controlled the city for the last twenty years of the 19th century. In 1918, the family moved to the South Side of Chicago and his father took a job with the grain market exchange. He attended grade school at Saint Ambrose Parish and high school at Mount Carmel High School graduating in 1935.

== World War II ==
With the outbreak of war in 1939 Magee wanted to get involved as soon as he could. His cousin John Gillespie Magee, Jr., author of the famous poem "High Flight", was a pilot with the Royal Canadian Air Force (RCAF) at the time so he went to Canada in mid-1941 to join him in the RCAF. His training lasted well into 1942 by which time the United States had since entered the war after the Attack on Pearl Harbor. Pretty soon American recruiters were scouring the RCAF camps looking for Americans volunteers to come back home. Chris signed on to become a Marine aviator and from July through November 1942, he continued training, flying the T-6 Texan trainer. Upon receiving his gold wings in November, he joined the Marine Corps, flying F4F Wildcats out of Naval Air Station Jacksonville, Florida. On June 5, 1943, Magee boarded the USS Rochambeau, a French liner converted to a troopship, for the journey to the South Pacific.

His first assignment in the summer of 1943 was with VMF-124 where he would learn to fly the F4U Corsair. In early September he joined the newly formed VMF-214 which was commanded then by Major Gregory "Pappy" Boyington.

In early 1944 when VMF-214 was sent back to the States, Magee and a few other squadron mates joined VMF-211 which was then stationed on Green Island. He remained with VMF-211 flying missions for six more weeks during which time he saw no action. Magee returned to the United States in February 1944 and was stationed at Marine Corps Air Station Cherry Point, North Carolina. While stationed there he met and married Molly Cleary. He was assigned to a new fighter squadron, VMF-911 that was flying the new Grumman F7F Tigercats. Soon thereafter the war ended.

Magee was 1 of 21 former squadron members from VMF-214 in San Francisco on September 12, 1945 when Major Boyington returned to the United States after his time as a prisoner of war with the Japanese. That night a party for him was held at the St. Francis Hotel in downtown San Francisco that was covered by Life magazine. The coverage of the party marked the first time that the magazine had ever showed people consuming alcohol.

When he was released from service in October 1945, he returned to Chicago with his young family.

=== Navy Cross citation ===
The President of the United States takes pleasure in presenting the NAVY CROSS to

FIRST LIEUTENANT CHRISTOPHER L. MAGEE

UNITED STATES MARINE CORPS RESERVE

for service as set forth in the following CITATION:

For extraordinary heroism as a pilot of a fighter plane attached to Marine Fighting Squadron Two Fourteen operating against Japanese forces in the Solomon Islands area from September 12 to October 22, 1943. Displaying superb flying ability and fearless intrepidity, First Lieutenant magee participated in numerous strike escorts, task force covers, fighter sweeps, strafing missions, and patrols. As a member of a division of four planes acting as a task force cover on September 18, he daring maneuvered his craft against thirty enemy dive bombers with fighter escorts and, pressing home his attack with skill and determination, destroyed two dive bombers and probably a third. During two subsequent fighter sweeps over Kahill [sic] Airdome on October 17–18, he valiantly engaged superior number of Japanese fighters which attempted to intercept our forces and succeeded in shooting down five Zeroes. The following day, volunteering to strafe Kara Airfield, Bougainville Island, he dived with another plane through intense anti-aircraft fire to a 40-foot level in a strafing run, leaving eight enemy aircraft blazing. First Lieutenant Magee's brilliant airmanship and indomitable fighting spirit contributed to the success of many vital missions and were in keeping wi[t]h the highest traditions of the United States Naval Service.

For the President

/S/ James Forrestal

Secretary of the Navy

== Post-war and fighting in Israel ==
Following the war Magee worked as black marketeer, bootlegger and as a courier for a covert group of U.S. "businessmen" involved in Latin American politics. With the outbreak of the 1948 Arab–Israeli War, Magee volunteered for the Israeli Haganah in Chicago in May 1948 and was immediately sent to České Budějovice for training on the Avia S-199, a Czechoslovak version of the Messerschmitt Bf 109. By the end of the month, he was ready to take to the Israeli skies and would become part of the 101st Fighter Squadron based at Ekron Airbase. He would see no combat action in Israel as the truce established in July was held together until after Magee returned to the States in October 1948. Upon his return, he found that his wife had divorced him and left with their two children. He would never see his wife again. In 1949, Magee found work with construction crews north of the Arctic Circle near Thule Air Base, Greenland, helping to build an early warning network.

== Bank robberies ==
In the early 1950s, Magee drifted between jobs again working as a courier for the organization that had employed him earlier. On June 13, 1955, Magee robbed his first bank, The Reserve Savings and Loan Association in Cicero, Illinois. Posing as a man who was in a partnership involving a patent for a burglary alarm system, Magee drew a gun on the manager and stole upwards of $2500.00. His second robbery would occur on August 13, 1956 when he pulled a gun on a bank teller at the same Cicero bank this time netting $400.00 to $500.00. His last bank robbery would occur on January 15, 1957 when he robbed the Lincolnway West Branch of the National Bank and Trust Company of South Bend. For this robbery he would be convicted and sentenced to fifteen years. He would serve out his time at the maximum security United States Penitentiary, Leavenworth and the medium security United States Penitentiary, Atlanta. He did not begin serving his sentence until 1959, because he appealed his first conviction to the United States Court of Appeals for the Seventh Circuit. His appeal was based on the precedent that evidence that an accused has committed another crime is inadmissible because during his trial for the third robbery the prosecution brought forward witnesses from the first two incidents in Cicero for which he was not charged. The decision was overruled with the decision being written by Judge Elmer Jacob Schnackenberg. The case was referred to a lower court where Magee was successfully re-tried and convicted. While in prison, Magee was diagnosed with and survived colon cancer. He also picked up 80 college credits via extension courses and became editor of the Leavenworth's prison magazine titled the "New Era."

== Later life ==
He was released in 1967 and returned to the Chicago area where he would quietly remain for the rest of his life. For six years, he worked as an editor and reporter for a local Chicago community paper. Magee died during surgery from stomach cancer at the Jesse Brown Veterans Administration Medical Center on the Westside of Chicago on December 27, 1995. His funeral took place at St. Joseph's Catholic Church in Libertyville, Illinois. He is buried in Arlington National Cemetery in Arlington, Virginia.

== Awards and decorations ==
His decorations and medals include:

Naval Aviator (Pilot) insignia
Navy Cross
Bronze Star Medal with V Device	Purple Heart with Gold Star	Navy and Marine Corps Achievement Medal with 3 Gold Stars
Navy Presidential Unit Citation w/ 2 service stars	Asiatic-Pacific Campaign Medal w/ 4 service stars	World War II Victory Medal

== See also ==
- John Magee
- James McDevitt Magee
- United States Marine Corps Aviation

== Notes ==
=== References ===
Bibliography

- Reed, Robert T. (2001). Lost Black Sheep: The Search for WWII Ace Chris Magee. Central Point, Oregon: Hellgate Press. ISBN 1-55571-549-4.
- Walton, Frank E. (1986). Once They Were Eagles: The Men of the Black Sheep Squadron. University Press of Kentucky. ISBN 0-8131-0875-6.

Web
