= W. K. Stratton (actor) =

American film and television actor

- Born: Walter Kirk Stratton Jr. August 2, 1950 (age 76); Front Royal, Virginia, U.S.
- Occupations: Film and television actor
- Years active: 1973–present

Walter Kirk Stratton Jr. (born August 2, 1950) is an American film and television actor born in Front Royal, Virginia. He portrayed Lt. Lawrence Casey in the American television series Black Sheep Squadron. Stratton also played the recurring role of Cmdr. Ted Lindsey in 14 episodes of the American legal drama television series JAG.

Stratton appeared in the 1979 film The Great Santini. Stratton played the role of Lawrence "Larry" Stanton III on three episodes of the science fiction television series Quantum Leap. He also starred in the comedy-drama television series Tequila and Bonetti. Stratton guest-starred in television programs including The Love Boat; The Rockford Files; Airwolf; The Incredible Hulk; The A-Team; Battlestar Galactica; The Rookies; Murder, She Wrote; Tales of the Gold Monkey; Magnum, P.I.; Lou Grant and Hill Street Blues. He also appeared in a few films.

== Television ==
Airdate(s)	Title	Role	Notes
December 2, 1975	The Rookies	Phil	Episode: Dead Heat
1976–1978	Baa Baa Black Sheep	Lt./Capt. Lawrence "Larry" Casey	Main Character, All 36 Episodes
October 29, 1977	The Love Boat	Kyle	Episode: The Joker is Mild / Take My Granddaughter, Please / First Time Out
October 27, 1978	The Rockford Files	Sgt. Frank Dusenberg	Episode: Kill the Messenger
December 1, 1978	The Incredible Hulk	Deputy Munro	Episode: Escape from Los Santos
January 5, 1979	The Rockford Files	Police Sgt. Frank Dusenberg	Episode: With the French Heel Back, Can the Nehru Jacket Be Far Behind?
February 18, 1979	Battlestar Galactica	Lt. Barton	Episode: Murder on the Rising Star
November 23, 1979	The Rockford Files	Dwight Whipple	Episode: The Hawaiian Headache
December 11, 1980	Magnum, P.I.	Ensign Healy	Episode: Don't Eat the Snow in Hawaii (Pilot Episode)
November 19, 1981	Magnum, P.I.	Officer Kelly	Episode: Wave Goodbye
December 14, 1981	Lou Grant	Scott Hume	Episode: Drifters
November 17, 1982	Tales of the Gold Monkey	Kramer	Episode: Once a Tiger...
January 22, 1984	Airwolf	Chuck Sinclair - Engineer	Episode: Shadow of the Hawke (Pilot Episode)
October 2, 1984	The A-Team	Captain Royce (US Army)	Episode: Fire
November 20, 1984	The A-Team	Captain Royce (US Army)	Episode: Showdown!
February 9, 1986	Murder, She Wrote	Deputy Morgan	Episode: Powder Keg
April 3, 1986	Hill Street Blues	Frederick Spears	Episode: Come and Get It
March 26, 1989	Quantum Leap	Dr. Berger	Episode: Genesis (Pilot Episode)
March 7, 1990	Quantum Leap	Sheriff Lyle Roundtree	Episode: Good Night, Dear Heart
1992	Tequila and Bonetti	Detective Lee	Main Cast, 11 Episodes
November 17, 1992 & November 24, 1992	Quantum Leap	Lawrence "Larry" Stanton III	Episodes: Trilogy Pt. I (One Little Heart), Pt. II (For Your Love), Pt. III (The Last Door)
1995–2003	JAG	Cmdr. Ted Lindsey	Recurring Character, 16 Episodes
December 14, 1999	JAG	Les Brown	Episode: "Ghosts of Christmas Past" (Note: The Cast of JAG portrayed multiple characters in this episode.)
May 15, 2001	JAG	Captain Stewart	Episode: "Mutiny" (Note: The Cast of JAG portrayed multiple characters in this episode.)
