= VMFA-214 =

United States Marine Corps fighter attack squadron

Marine Fighter Attack Squadron 214
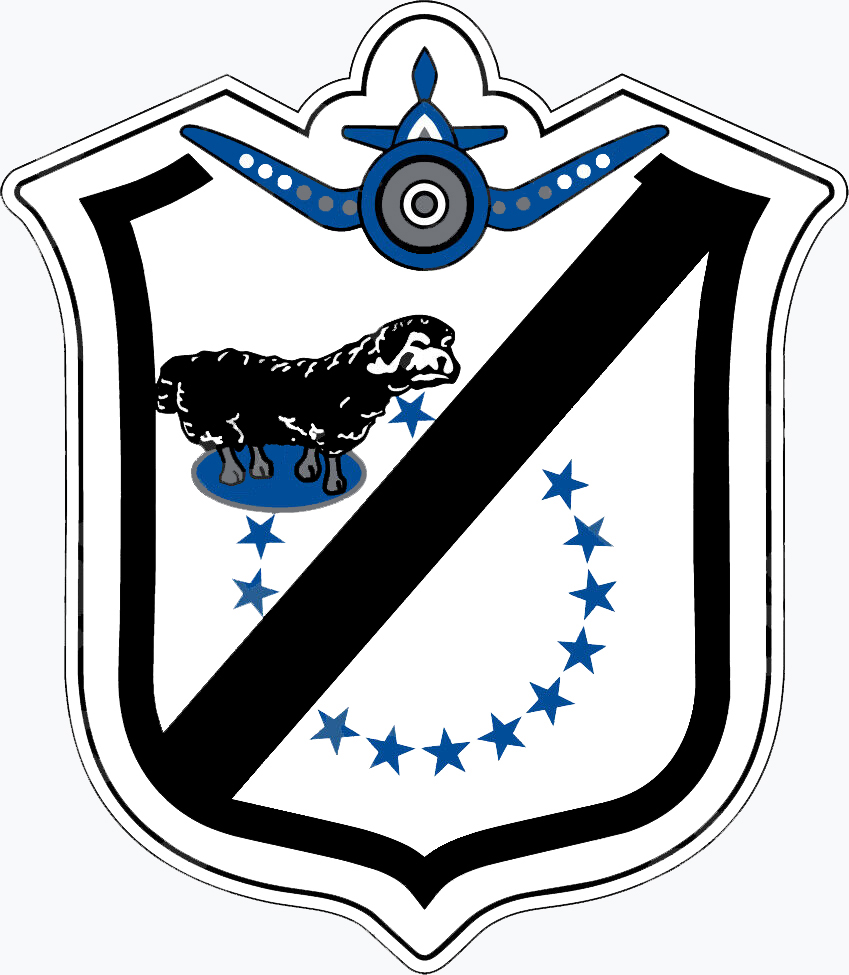
- Active: 1 July 1942–present
- Country: United States of America
- Branch: United States Marine Corps
- Type: Fighter Attack
- Role: Air interdiction Close Air Support; Offensive Counter Air; Defensive Counter Air; Electronic Warfare
- Part of: Marine Aircraft Group 13; 3rd Marine Aircraft Wing
- Garrison/HQ: Marine Corps Air Station Yuma
- Nicknames: The Black Sheep; Swashbucklers (early WWII)
- Tail Code: WE
- Engagements: World War II; Korean War; Battle of Pusan Perimeter; Battle of Inchon; Battle of Chosin Reservoir; Vietnam War; Operation Desert Storm; Global war on terrorism; Operation Enduring Freedom; Operation Iraqi Freedom; 2003 invasion of Iraq

Commanders
- Current commander: LtCol Chad D. Allen
- Notable commanders: Maj. Greg Boyington

Aircraft flown
- Attack: A-4 Skyhawk (1962–89); AV-8B Harrier II (1989-2022)
- Fighter: F4F Wildcat (1942); F4U Corsair (1943–53); F9F Panther (1953); F2H Banshee (1953–57); FJ Fury (1957–62); F-35B Lightning II (2022–present)

Marine Fighter Attack Squadron 214 (VMFA-214) is a United States Marine Corps fighter attack squadron that currently flies the Lockheed Martin F-35B Lightning II. The squadron's home field is Marine Corps Air Station Yuma, Arizona, and it is assigned to Marine Aircraft Group 13 (MAG-13) of the 3rd Marine Aircraft Wing (3rd MAW).

The squadron is known as the Black Sheep. Its World War II exploits and the memoirs of commanding officer Colonel Gregory "Pappy" Boyington inspired the 1970s television show Baa Baa Black Sheep, later syndicated as Black Sheep Squadron.

== Mission ==
Locate, attack and destroy surface targets; intercept and destroy enemy aircraft; and provide electronic warfare support.

== History ==
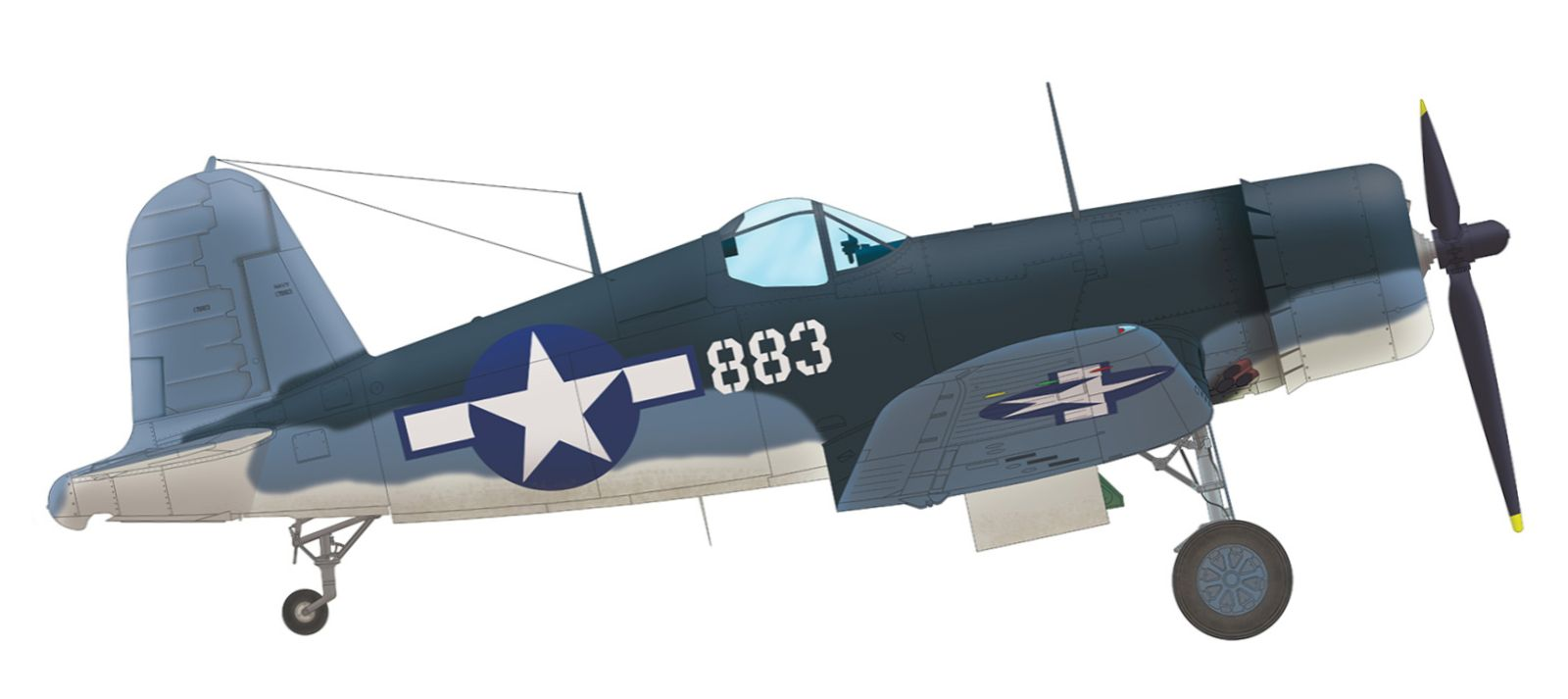
Vought F4U-1A Corsair, BuNo 17883, of Gregory "Pappy" Boyington, the commander of VMF-214, Vella Lavella end of 1943

=== World War II ===
The unit was commissioned as Marine Fighter Squadron 214 (VMF-214) on 1 July 1942, at Marine Corps Air Station Ewa on the island of Oahu, Hawaii. Initially called the "Swashbucklers," the squadron was moved to Turtle Bay Airfield on Espiritu Santo in the New Hebrides in August. There Major Gregory "Pappy" Boyington (Medal of Honor, Navy Cross) took command of the 27 pilots who became the original "Black Sheep" of VMF-214.

Major Boyington had just returned from a year's tour in China as a member of the 1st American Volunteer Group, commonly called the Flying Tigers, where he was credited with downing multiple Japanese aircraft. Boyington is officially credited with two kills of a claimed six in China, plus another 22 with the Black Sheep, for a total of 28.

Boyington and Major Stan Bailey were given permission to form the unassigned pilots into a squadron, with the understanding that they would have less than four weeks to have them fully trained and ready for combat. The pilots ranged from experienced combat veterans with several air-to-air victories to their credit to new replacement pilots from the United States.

From Espiritu Santo the squadron was moved forward to Guadalcanal and Henderson Airfield in the Solomon Islands. At first, the squadron was not assigned aircraft or ancillary personnel; its pilots flew to Guadalcanal and later the Russell Islands in borrowed planes that were in less-than-satisfactory condition. From Guadalcanal they would be moved to Munda and Vella Lavella.

On the evening of 13 September 1943, the men of VMF-214 gathered in their commanding officer's hut, when it was suggested that they needed a nickname. Originally the squadron called itself "Boyington's Bastards" after its new commander, the fact that all of the pilots had been "orphans" and not attached to a squadron when they got together, and the fact they possessed few reliable planes and no mechanics. The following day, this new label was presented to the Marine Corps public information officer on the island at the time, Captain Jack DeChant, who rejected it because civilian newspapers would never print it. DeChant suggested the call sign "Black Sheep" because the expression meant essentially the same thing.

Although they dropped the moniker "Boyington's Bastards," the squadron still retains the black bar of bastardy across its shield. They chose for their badge the black shield of illegitimacy, the bend sinister, a black sheep superimposed, surrounded by a circle of 12 stars, and crowned with the image of their aircraft, the F4U Corsair.

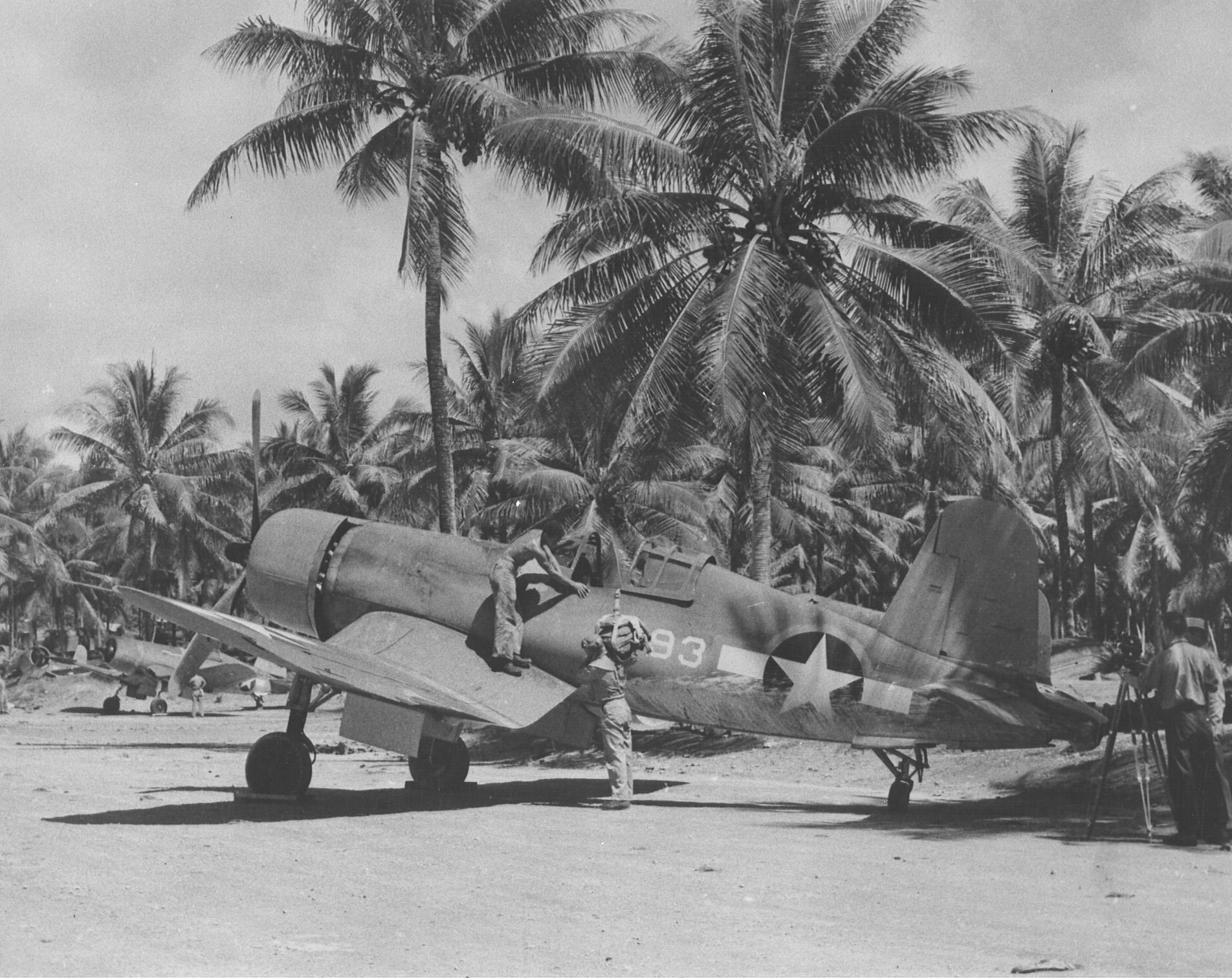
F4U of VMF-214 at Turtle Bay Airfield, Espiritu Santo

The Black Sheep squadron fought for 84 days. They met the Japanese over their own fields and territory, piled up a record of 203 planes destroyed or damaged, produced nine fighter aces with 97 confirmed air-to-air kills, sank several troop transports and supply ships, destroyed many installations, and notched numerous other victories. The original Black Sheep were awarded the Presidential Unit Citation for extraordinary heroism in action. After their first combat tour, 26 pilots from the squadron left the airfield at Munda for a week of rest and relaxation in Sydney, Australia, where they holed up in the Australia Hotel.

The Black Sheep ended their second combat tour on 8 January 1944, five days after Major Boyington was shot down and captured by the Japanese. The original Black Sheep were disbanded and the pilots were placed in the pilot pool in Marine Aircraft Group 11. Exploits of this incarnation of the unit were loosely fictionalized in the 1970s television series Baa Baa Black Sheep, later renamed Black Sheep Squadron, starring Robert Conrad as Boyington.

VMF-214 was reformed on 29 January 1944 at Marine Corps Air Station Santa Barbara near Goleta, California. They deployed aboard the aircraft carrier USS Franklin on 4 February 1945 to join on-going operations on Okinawa. On 19 March, a Japanese bomber hit USS Franklin. The explosion and resulting fire killed 772 people aboard Franklin including 32 Black Sheep members. Many Black Sheep aircraft were launching for a strike on mainland Japan at the time. First Lieutenants Ken Linder and Robert "Bob" McDonnell were given credit for shooting down the Japanese bomber that struck Franklin. This ended VMF-214's involvement in World War II. During the war, the squadron suffered 23 pilots killed in action or missing and lost 48 aircraft to accidents or enemy contact.

In April 1945, the Black Sheep were moved to Marine Corps Air Station El Centro, California, and then to MCAS El Toro, California in October 1945. In the next few years, the Black Sheep deployed for operations on board USS Rendova, USS Bairoko, USS Badoeng Strait, and USS Boxer.

=== Korean War ===
When the Korean War broke out, VMF-214 was en route to Hawaii on board USS Badoeng Strait hosting midshipmen from the Naval Academy. The squadron's commanding officer, Major Robert P. Keller, was summoned to headquarters in Hawaii where he met with then Colonel Victor Krulak. Krulak bluntly asked, "Major, are you ready to go to war?"

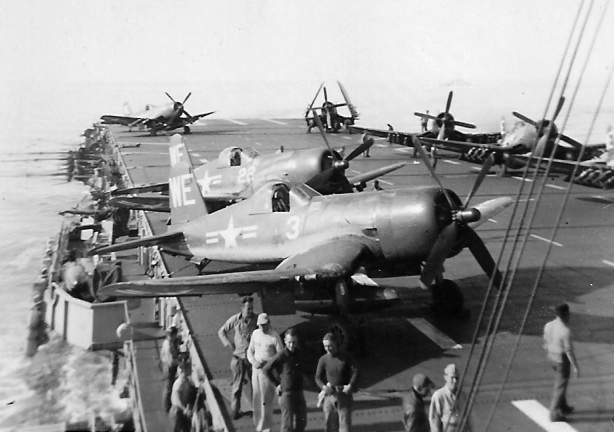
VMF-214 F4U-4Bs on USS Sicily in late 1950

Flying eight F4U-4B Corsairs on 3 August 1950, VMF-214 became the first Marine squadron to see action in Korea, when they launched from USS Sicily and executed a raid against enemy installations near Inchon. After the F4Us delivered their incendiary bombs and rockets, they followed up with a series of strafing runs. Flying from USS Badoeng Strait and USS Boxer, the Black Sheep completed two combat tours in Korea. They participated in key battles, including the Inchon landing and the United Nations's defeat and withdrawal from Chosin Reservoir. In these and other battles, they provided nearly continual air cover, interdicting supply and communication lines, and inflicting heavy damage on numerous ground emplacements, and enemy armor.

=== Late 1950s–early 1960s ===
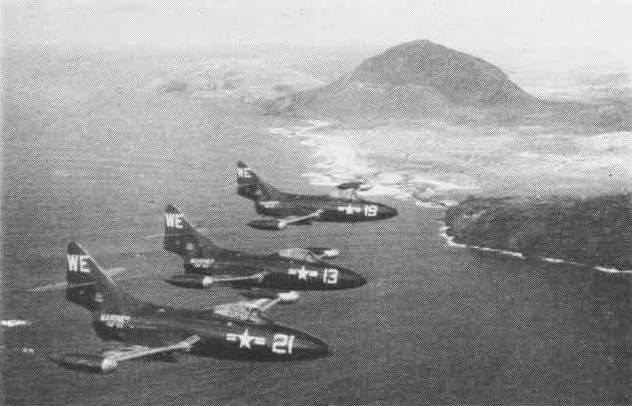
F9F-2 Panther jets from VMF-214 flying over Oahu in 1953.

Shortly before the close of hostilities in Korea, VMF-214 returned to Marine Corps Air Station El Toro. Here they exchanged their Corsairs for F9F Panther jets and began another training program. In the spring of 1953, the Black Sheep traded their F9s for new F2H-4 Banshees, and headed for the Hawaiian Islands. Upon their arrival, they became part of Marine Aircraft Group 13 and the First Marine Brigade.

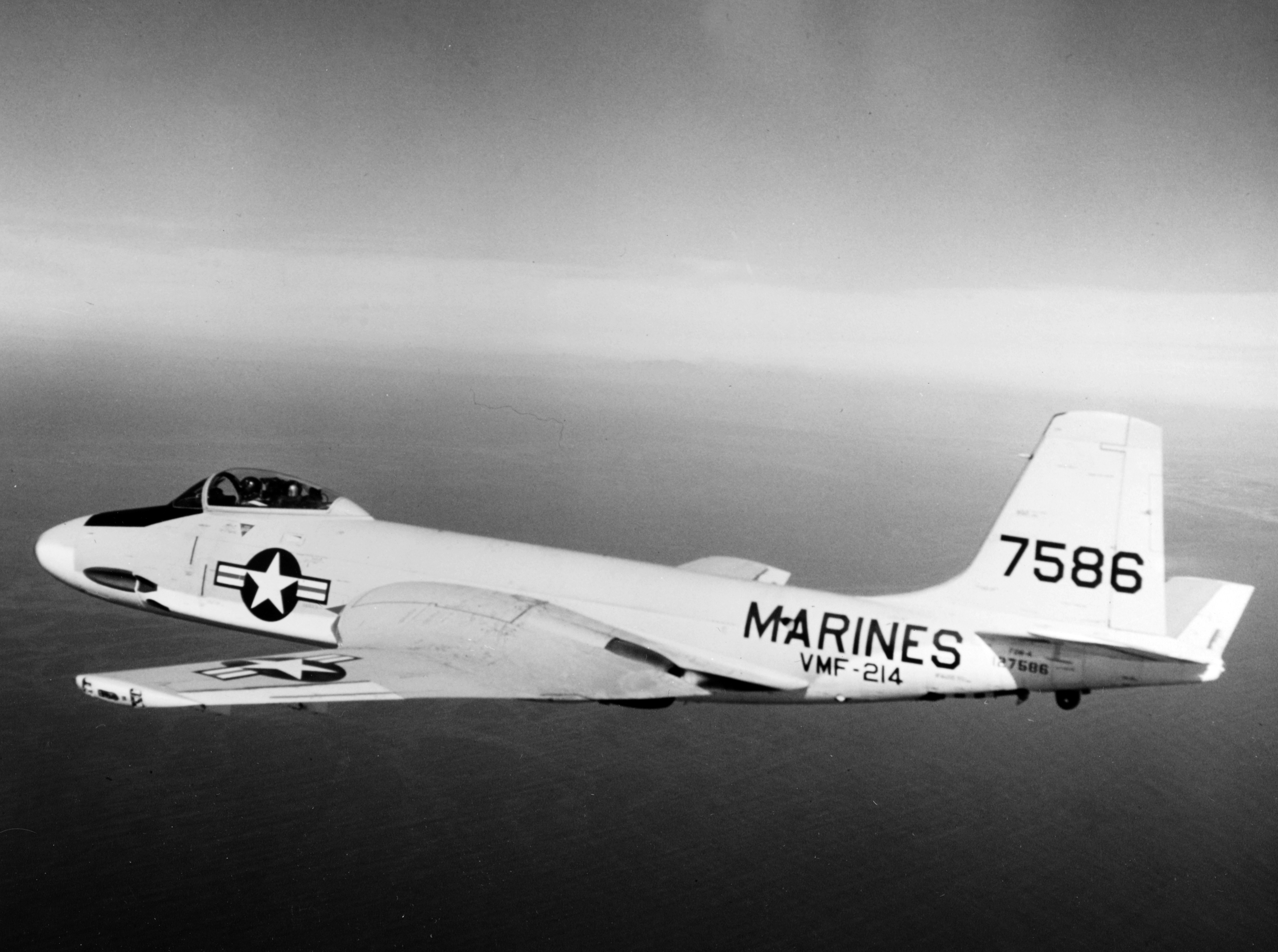
An F2H-4 of VMF-214 over San Diego in 1956

In January 1956, the Black Sheep again received the order to "get ready." This time, the circumstances were less demanding. In the ensuing fifteen months, the Black Sheep covered all aspects of Marine aviation. On 31 December 1956, the squadron was redesignated Marine All Weather Fighter Squadron-214, flying the Banshee. The buildup included instrument flying, bombing, rocketry, strafing, air-to-air gunnery, field carrier landing practice, high and low altitude special weapon drops, and carrier qualifications. VMF(AW)-214 became the first Marine squadron to be qualified in special weapons delivery, in February 1957.

The period between Korea and Vietnam saw several changes for the Black Sheep. VMF was changed to VMA on 9 July 1957, designating the Squadron as "attack" rather than "fighter". In March 1958, the Black Sheep shifted to the FJ-4 Fury. VMA-214 and VMF-212 became the first squadrons to fly their aircraft across the Pacific to deploy. In January 1959, the Black Sheep changed to the newer FJ-4B.

In the FJ-4B Fury jets, the squadron logged over 27,000 hours as an attack squadron. This included a stretch with over 20,000 accident-free flight hours. The Black Sheep were awarded, on 29 August 1961, the CMC safety award for the "most outstanding safety record" among Marine attack squadrons.

On 23 January 1962, the Black Sheep replaced the FJ-4B Fury with the A-4B Skyhawk. This began a 27-year association between the Black Sheep and follow-on versions of the Skyhawk. In the fall of 1963, VMA-214 was selected as the first Marine Corps squadron to provide a detachment ("N") to deploy on a Westpac cruise aboard USS Hornet. The detachment was assigned to intercept Soviet Tupolev Tu-95 "Bear" and Tupolev Tu-16 "Badger" aircraft flying toward the anti-submarine naval task force in the Sea of Japan. They returned home to MCAS Kaneohe Bay in April 1964.

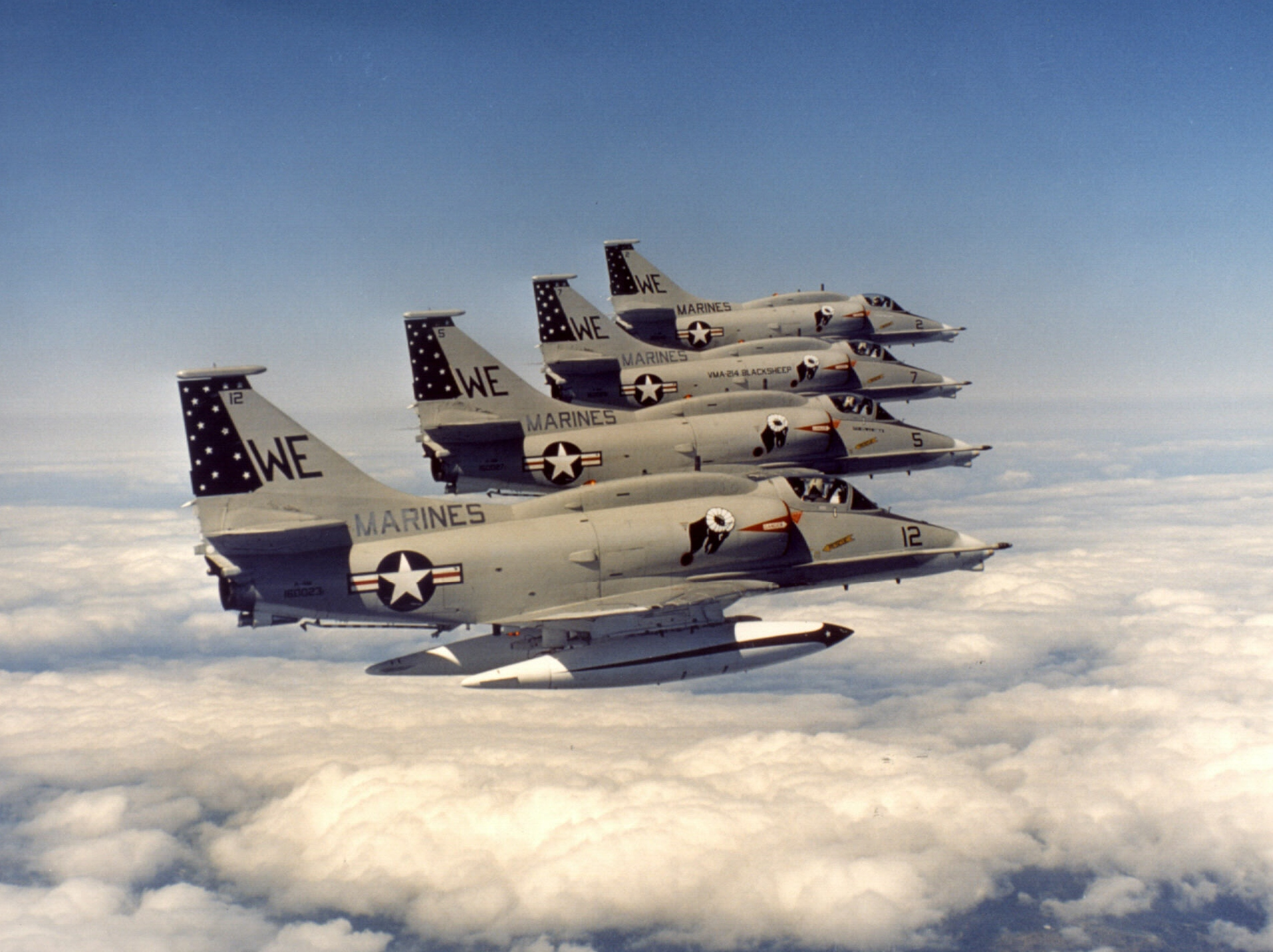
A division of A-4M Skyhawks from VMA-214 in the 1970s

=== Vietnam War ===
In May 1965, the Black Sheep were reassigned to Marine Aircraft Group 12, 1st Marine Aircraft Wing, Fleet Marine Force, Pacific, and moved to MCAS Iwakuni, Japan.

On 21 June 1965, the first Black Sheep division flew into Chu Lai, Republic of Vietnam, landing on 4,000 feet (1,219 m) of SATS runway. 4,000 feet of the original 8,000 feet (2,438 m) had been removed to fix the "floating runway" problem during monsoon season. The A-4s were landing with MOREST and departing using the land-based catapult; C-130s were being launched with JATO assist. The Navy Seabees had 4,000 feet of aluminum runway planks stacked up on the departure end of the runway. One of the Marine generals and his "spit shined" C-130 decided, against direction from the tower, to do a full run-up on the runway prior to departure. The Seabees were hunkered down behind their heavy equipment as the planks went sailing over their heads.

The Black Sheep rotated out of Vietnam in February 1966 to pick up new pilots and personnel. In April 1966, the Black Sheep deployed back to Chu Lai where they flew more combat missions to support the Republic of Vietnam. The Black Sheep squadron flew 14,000 hours in combat, 13,000 sorties, and dropped more than 10,000 tons of ordnance and was awarded the Navy Unit Commendation with Bronze Star.

VMA-214 returned from Vietnam in April 1967, moved to El Toro, and was reassigned to Marine Aircraft Group 33, 3rd Marine Aircraft Wing, Fleet Marine Force, Pacific. Once in El Toro, the unit became recognized as an operational training squadron for attack pilots, many of whom were replacement pilots bound for Vietnam. During December 1970, the Black Sheep were reassigned to Marine Aircraft Group 13.

=== The 1970s and 1980s ===
During the late 1970s, and into the 1980s, the squadron participated in the Unit Deployment Program, rotating between Marine Aircraft Group 12, Marine Corps Air Station, Iwakuni, Japan, and Marine Aircraft Group 13 at MCAS El Toro, California. In October 1982, the Black Sheep were awarded the Lawson H. M. Sanderson Award for Attack Squadron of the Year. In September 1987, the Black Sheep squadron moved to Marine Corps Air Station Yuma, Arizona. On 17 October 1987, the Black Sheep became the first squadron to win the Sanderson award for a second time.

In 1989, the Black Sheep completed 30,000 accident-free hours and six years of accident-free flying. In June 1989, the Black Sheep introduced single-seat fixed-wing "night attack" aircraft to the Marine Corps with the first operational squadron of AV-8B Night Attack Harrier IIs.

=== 1990s ===
Marine Attack Squadron 214 became the first squadron to introduce the Night Attack capability into the Unit Deployment Program in October 1991, by deploying 20 Night Attack Harriers to Iwakuni, Japan, for seven months. Continuing in their traditions as pioneers, in July 1993, the Black Sheep conducted a dedicated "Night Systems" deployment to the Marine Corps Air Ground Combat Center at Twenty-Nine Palms, California. Ultimately, sorties were conducted throughout the night until shortly before dawn over three weeks. Medical data was gathered on night flying and its effect on pilot performance.

From December 1993 to July 1994, Marines of VMA-214 deployed aboard USS Peleliu and participated in contingency Operation Restore Hope and Operation Quick Draw off the coast of Somalia. Also during this deployment, VMA-214 Det B participated in Operation Distant Runner in Burundi and Rwanda.

In October 1994 a detachment from Marine Attack Squadron 214 embarked aboard USS Essex to support the 13th Marine Expeditionary Unit (13th MEU). While deployed, the detachment supported Operation Southern Watch in Southwest Asia and Operation United Shield off the coast of Somalia.

During April 1996, Marine Attack Squadron 214 again deployed a detachment aboard USS Tarawa in support of the 13th MEU. The detachment supported Operation Southern Watch off the coast of Kuwait and Operation Desert Strike in Northern Iraq.

In August 1997, the Black Sheep were recognized for the third time with the Lawson H.M. Sanderson Award for Attack Squadron of the Year. In 1998 and 1999, the Black Sheep Squadron prepared for and deployed aboard USS Boxer heading directly to the North Persian Gulf to take part in Operation Desert Fox. It was on this deployment that the Harrier community had its first operational use of night vision devices for shipboard activities to include working with helicopters on a shared deck.

=== Global war on terror ===
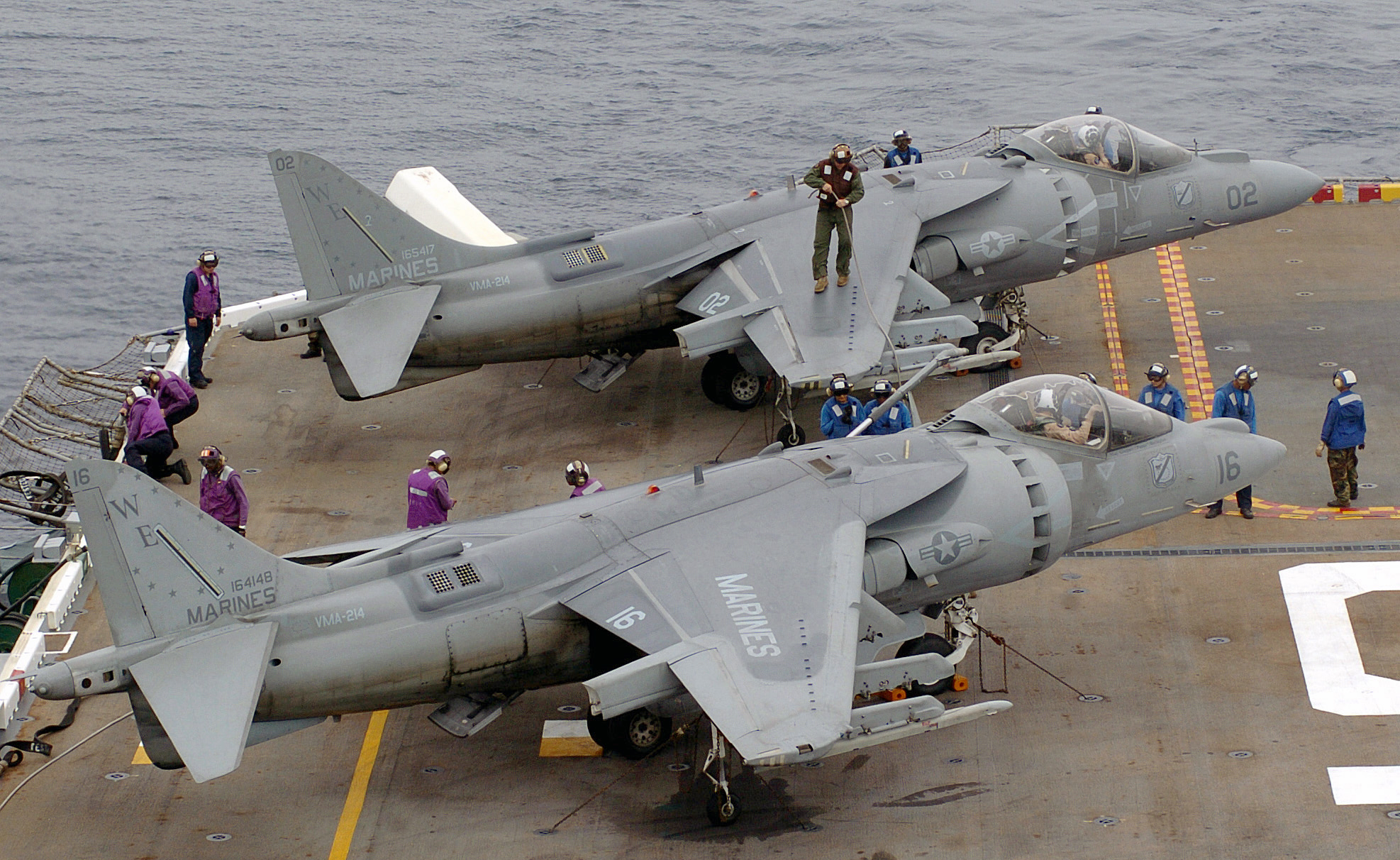
AV-8Bs of VMA-214 on USS Peleliu in 2005

The Black Sheep split the squadron. The squadron deployed to Marine Corps Air Station Iwakuni, Japan, while Detachment Bravo sailed with the 13th Marine Expeditionary Unit aboard USS Tarawa. The Marines of VMA-214 participated in humanitarian operations in East Timor and Indonesia, then off the coast of Yemen with the 13th MEU(SOC), participating in Operation Determined Response, the recovery of the destroyer USS Cole.

VMA-214 deployed twice for Operation Iraqi Freedom: for the 2003 invasion of Iraq and again from February to August 2004, operating out of Al Asad.

Most of the squadron deployed to Afghanistan in May 2009 as part of the 17,000-troop increase announced by President Obama in mid-February 2009. Attached to the 2nd Marine Expeditionary Brigade, the squadron operated from Kandahar International Airport as part of Marine Aircraft Group 40 and provided close air support and aerial reconnaissance.

Meanwhile, a detachment from VMA-214 deployed for Operation Enduring Freedom, assigned to the 13th Marine Expeditionary Unit under Combined Task Force 151 (CTF-151). During the deployment, they supported the 2nd Marine Expeditionary Brigade in southern Afghanistan and counter-piracy operations off the coast of Africa. The squadron returned to MCAS Yuma in November 2009 having flown some 3,000 hours during their six-month tour. The Black Sheep received a fourth Lawson H. M. Sanderson Award as the 2010 Attack Squadron of the Year.

=== F-35B transition ===
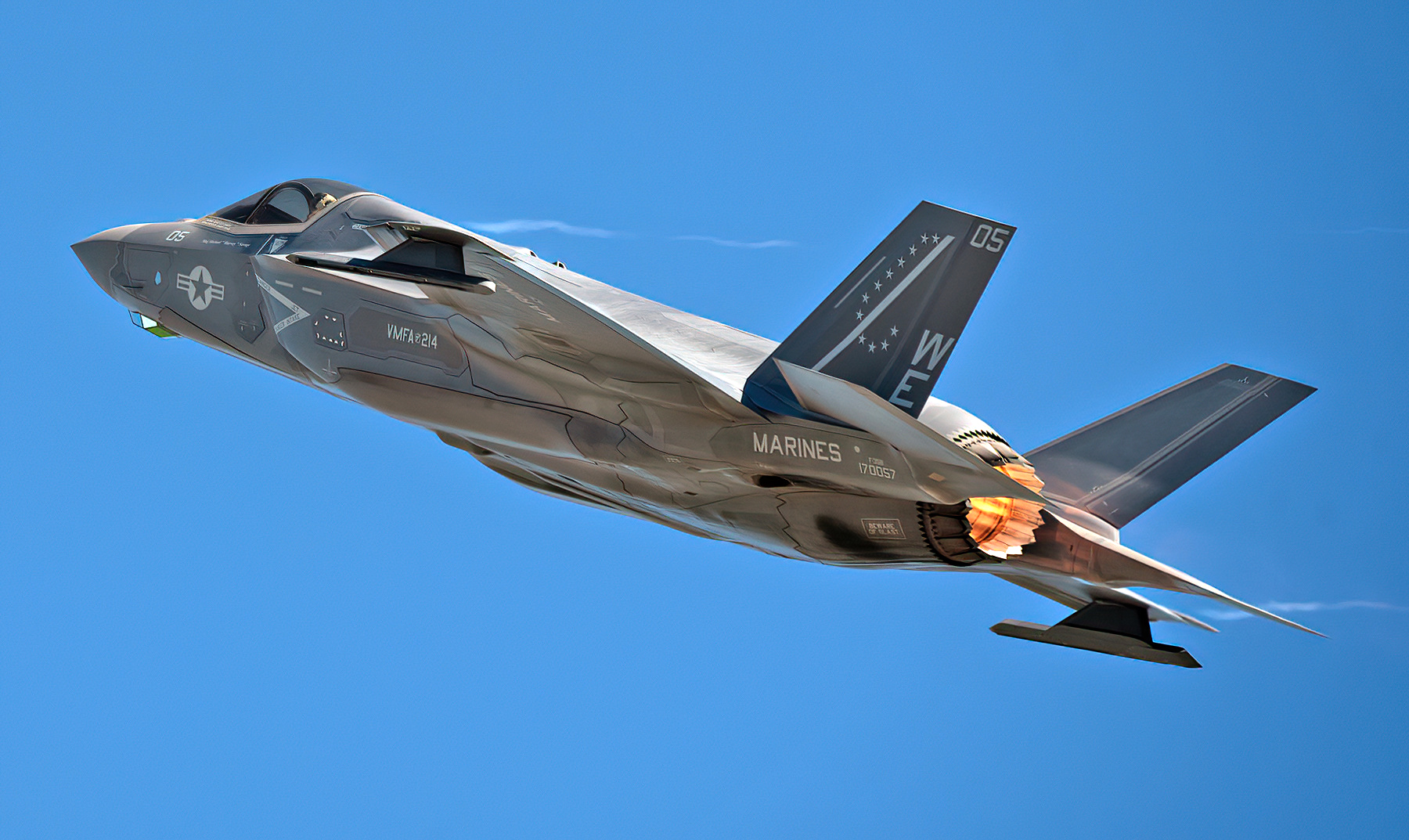
A VMFA-214 F-35B departing MCAS Yuma in 2023

On 25 March 2022, the squadron was redesignated as Marine Fighter Attack Squadron 214 (VMFA-214) as it began accepting new F-35B Lightning II aircraft from the Lockheed Martin factory in Fort Worth, Texas.

== Black Sheep aces ==
These Marines of VMF-214 are flying aces, aviators credited with shooting down five or more enemy aircraft during aerial combat:

- Gregory "Pappy" Boyington — 28.0
- Robert M. Hanson — 25.0
- John F. Bolt Jr. — 12.0 (6 in World War II, 6 in Korea)
- Christopher L. Magee — 9.0
- William N. Case — 8.0
- Don H. Fisher — 8.0
- Alvin J. Jensen — 7.0
- Robert W. McClurg — 7.0
- Paul A. Mullen — 6.5
- H. Allen McCartney Jr. — 5.0
- Edwin L. Olander — 5.0
- Hartwell V. Scarborough — 5.0
- Stanley T. Synar — 5.0

== See also ==
- Cactus Air Force
- List of active United States Marine Corps aircraft squadrons
- United States Marine Corps Aviation
- The Whiffenpoof Song
