= James Whitmore Jr. =

American actor and director (born 1948)

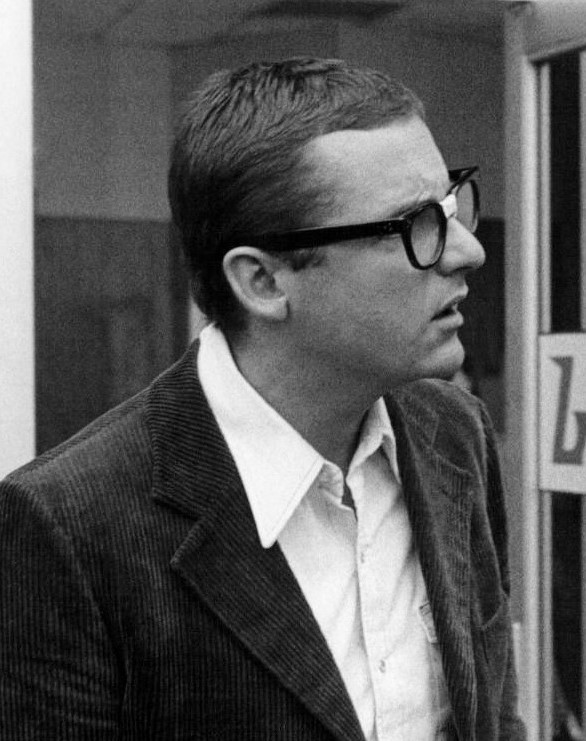
- Whitmore Jr. as Freddie Beamer in The Rockford Files in 1977
- Born: James Allen Whitmore Jr; October 24, 1948 (age 78); Manhattan, New York, U.S.
- Occupations: Actor, director
- Years active: 1975–present
- Father: James Whitmore

James Allen Whitmore Jr. (born October 24, 1948), is an American actor and television director. He is best known for his roles as Captain Jim Gutterman on the television program Baa Baa Black Sheep, Freddie Beamer in The Rockford Files (1977–1979), and Sgt Bernie Terwilliger in Hunter (1984–1986), and since the 1980s as a prolific television director. He is the son of actor James Whitmore.

== Life and career ==
Born in Manhattan, New York, Whitmore Jr. is the son of Emmy and Golden Globe award-winning actor James Whitmore and Nancy Mygatt. James Whitmore Jr. began his acting career relatively late. He has had recurring guest-starring roles on the TV series The Rockford Files and Hunter. He also appeared in two episodes of Magnum, P.I. and an episode of Battlestar Galactica before directing many episodes of series by Donald P. Bellisario, the creator of Magnum and a writer on Galactica.

Whitmore occasionally acts in the episodes he directs, such as two episodes of Quantum Leap ("8 1/2 Months" and "Trilogy, Pt. 1"). In that series, as well as several others, he played different characters in each appearance, rather than recurring roles.

In addition to directing episodes of shows for Bellisario (Quantum Leap, Tequila and Bonetti, JAG, NCIS, and NCIS: Los Angeles), Whitmore directed episodes of more than one series for Joss Whedon. Whitmore directed the final episodes of two different series (Dawson's Creek and the aforementioned Quantum Leap). After Leap, Whitmore again directed Scott Bakula in episodes of Star Trek: Enterprise, NCIS: New Orleans (including the Dean Stockwell reunion episode), and Mr. and Mrs. Smith. He also directed David Boreanaz in both Angel and Bones. The Pretender reunited Whitmore with many of the same writing staff as Quantum Leap.

== Filmography ==
=== Director ===
- 21 Jump Street (8 episodes)
- 24 (6 episodes, all from Day 2)
- Angel (1 episode)
- Beverly Hills, 90210 (11 episodes)
- Blue Bloods (2 episodes)
- Bones (2 episodes)
- Brooklyn South (2 episodes)
- Buffy the Vampire Slayer (5 episodes)
- The Cleaner (2 episodes)
- Cold Case (6 episodes)
- The Commish (8 episodes)
- Crowfoot (television film)
- CSI: NY (1 episode)
- Dark Angel (2 episodes)
- Dawson's Creek (6 episodes)
- Dead Like Me (4 episodes)
- Elsbeth (1 episode)
- Evil (2 episodes)
- Ferris Bueller (1 episode)
- Get Real (3 episodes)
- The Good Fight (4 episodes)
- The Good Wife (12 episodes)
- Hawaii Five-0 (1 episode)
- Hunter (23 episodes)
- JAG (2 episodes)
- Jericho (3 episodes)
- Las Vegas (2 episodes)
- Madam Secretary (5 episodes)
- Mr. and Mrs. Smith (1 episode)
- NCIS (51 episodes)
- NCIS: Hawaii (3 episodes)
- NCIS: Los Angeles (13 episodes)
- NCIS: New Orleans (first half of the NCIS backdoor pilot and 16 episodes)
- NCIS: Origins (1 episode)
- Notorious (1 episode)
- Nowhere Man (3 episodes)
- Person of Interest (1 episode)
- The Pretender (7 episodes)
- Profiler (2 episodes)
- Providence (3 episodes)
- Quantico (1 episode)
- Quantum Leap (15 episodes)
- Ray Donovan (1 episode)
- The Resident (3 episodes)
- Roswell (2 episodes)
- Star Trek: Enterprise (2 episodes)
- Tequila and Bonetti (4 episodes)
- The Unit (5 episodes)
- The X-Files (1 episode)
- Witchblade (4 episodes)
- Young Americans (5 episodes)

=== Actor ===
- Baa Baa Black Sheep (1976–1977, TV Series) as Capt. James 'Jim' Gutterman
- The Rockford Files (1977–1979, TV Series) as Freddie Beamer
- Lou Grant (1977–1980, TV Series) as Nick Boyer / Officer Trask
- The Boys in Company C (1978) as Lt. Archer
- The Gypsy Warriors (1978) as Captain Sheldon Alhern
- Battlestar Galactica (1978, TV Series) as Robber
- The Eddie Capra Mysteries (1978, TV Series) as Dr. Timothy Faulkner
- A Force of One (1979) as Moskowitz
- The Long Riders (1980) as Mr. Rixley
- Magnum, P.I. (1981–1982, TV Series) as Sebastian Nuzo / Billy Joe Bob Little
- The Greatest American Hero (1981–1983, TV Series) as Norman Fackler / Byron Bigsby / Gordon McCready
- Simon & Simon (1981–1986, TV Series) as Campaign manager Al Goddard / Bill Freeman / Paul Scully
- Don't Cry, It's Only Thunder (1982) as Major Flaherty
- Purple Hearts (1984) as Bwana
- Airwolf (1984, TV Series) as Sam Houston / Maj. Sam Roper
- Highway to Heaven (1984, TV Series) as Richard Gaines
- Hardcastle and McCormick (1984–1985, TV Series) as Travis Baker / Kenneth Boyer
- Hunter (1984–1986, TV Series) as Sgt. Bernie Terwilliger
- The Twilight Zone (1985–1987, (TV Series) as Ira Richman (segment "The Girl I Married") / Sheriff Dennis Wells (segment "Nightcrawlers")
- Quantum Leap (1991–1993, TV Series) as Police Captain / Sheriff Clayton Fuller / Bob Crockett
- Stringer (1992) as Gunman
