= List of Baa Baa Black Sheep episodes =

Baa Baa Black Sheep (renamed for Season 2 as Black Sheep Squadron and later syndicated under that title) is a television series that premiered on September 21, 1976, with a lead-in movie ("Flying Misfits") and ran from September 23, 1976, to April 6, 1978. The series consisted of two seasons, a 24-episode Season 1, and a 13-episode Season 2, for a total of 37 episodes.

== Series overview ==
Season	Episodes	Originally released	
Season	Episodes	First released	Last released
1	24	September 21, 1976	March 22, 1977
2	13	December 14, 1977	April 6, 1978

== Episodes ==
=== Season 1: 1976–77 ===
No. overall	No. in season	Title	Directed by	Written by	Original release date
1	1	"Flying Misfits"	Russ Mayberry	Stephen J. Cannell	September 21, 1976
2	2	"Flying Misfits"	Russ Mayberry	Stephen J. Cannell	September 21, 1976
Retired Marine Corps Major Greg Boyington is working with the Flying Tigers American Volunteer Group in China when the Japanese attack on Pearl Harbor brings America into World War II. He rejoins the Marines and, after refusing a desk job, forms his own fighter squadron in the South Pacific from a group of disciplinary cases and misfits, teaching them the Thach Weave to counter the Zero's tighter turning radius. (Two-hour pilot, which was split into two one-hour episodes for syndication.); Guest stars: Sharon Gless, George Gaynes
3	3	"Best Three Out of Five"	Lawrence Doheny	Stephen J. Cannell	September 23, 1976
Pappy visits Col. Lard in Espritos Marcos, and learns that Lard plans to remove the Black Sheep from combat duty due to excessive rules violations. When Pappy returns, he finds Major Red Buell, the man from whom he stole the Corsairs, taking charge of a new squadron on Vella la Cava. Guest stars: Charles Napier
4	4	"Small War"	Walter Doniger	Philip DeGuere Jr.	September 28, 1976
After Pappy is accidentally shot down by Wiley and parachutes to a Japanese-occupied island, he is rescued by an Australian Navy man who has been hiding there for two months. Meanwhile, Gutterman has serious doubts about his ability to command with Pappy gone, prompting a visit from General Moore. Guest star: Rene Auberjonois
5	5	"High Jinx"	John Peyser	Ken Pettus	October 5, 1976
With the Japanese air fleet now including modified Zeroes, Pappy and Casey do some dealing to try and secure armor-piercing ammo. Pappy also brings a new pilot into the squadron whom Gutterman says is considered a jinx. Guest star: Donald Petrie
6	6	"Prisoners of War"	Jackie Cooper	Ken Pettus	October 12, 1976
An English-speaking Japanese pilot is shot down and captured, but then bonds with the men of the squadron. Guest star: Clyde Kusatsu
7	7	"Presumed Dead"	Lawrence Doheny	Philip DeGuere Jr. & Milt Rosen	October 26, 1976
An American pilot believed shot down is found floating on a raft, but exhibits strange behavior. Boyington discovers he's been brainwashed and sent on a secret mission by the Japanese. Guest stars: Kent McCord, James Hong, Norman Burton
8	8	"The Meatball Circus"	John Peyser	Stephen J. Cannell	November 9, 1976
Boyington tries to come up with an alternative to a plan for a secret mission that's sure to be suicide. Guest stars: Stewart Moss, Robert Clarke
9	9	"Up for Grabs"	Ivan Dixon & Alex Beaton	Philip DeGuere	November 16, 1976
A Japanese commando force invades the island where the 214 is stationed in an attempt to capture General Douglas MacArthur, who's due to visit. Guest stars: George Takei, Yuki Shimoda
10	10	"Anyone for Suicide?"	Jackie Cooper	Ken Pettus	November 23, 1976
Boyington, just recovered from malaria, gets no volunteers for a dangerous mission after Doc Lindsay tells the Black Sheep to ground Pappy or he'll send him stateside. Pappy decides to fly the mission anyway, with four strangers. After bad weather keeps the replacements from flying in, the mission is scrubbed. To get back into Pappy's good graces, the Black Sheep decide to fly with Pappy, but the mission doesn't go as planned.
11	11	"New Georgia on My Mind"	Jeannot Szwarc	Ken Pettus	November 30, 1976
A Marine colonel rubs Pappy the wrong way when he lands his paratroopers on Vella la Cava and announces he's taking charge of the squadron's next mission. Guest star: James Luisi
12	12	"The Cat's Whiskers"	Russ Mayberry	Milt Rosen	December 7, 1976
Hoping to gain favor with the court martial board in an upcoming hearing, Pappy makes plans to attack a seemingly impregnable Japanese radar base. Guest star: Frank Maxwell
13	13	"Love and War"	William Wiard	Philip DeGuere Jr.	December 14, 1976
Two squadron pilots fall for the same nurse, who happens to be from Bragg's hometown. Guest star: Leslie Charleson
14	14	"The War Biz Warrior"	Lawrence Doheny	Gordon Dawson	January 4, 1977
A famous actor joins the squadron, but the Black Sheep start to resent the media attention piled on him. Guest stars: James Darren, Ford Rainey
15	15	"The Deadliest Enemy of All: Part 1"	Barry Shear	Philip DeGuere Jr.	January 11, 1977
A recently injured Pappy falls for a new nurse who seems to be avoiding his advances. (First episode with Larroquette, Manetti, and MacKay in the opening credits.); Guest star: Anne Francis
16	16	"The Deadliest Enemy of All: Part 2"	Barry Shear	Philip DeGuere Jr.	January 18, 1977
Pappy finds out the nurse he's falling for is still married, albeit to a soldier who has been listed as missing for over a year. Guest stars: Anne Francis, Greg Boyington
17	17	"Devil in the Slot"	Edward Dein	Stephen J. Cannell	January 25, 1977
As the squadron deals with a stubborn new head mechanic, Gutterman cracks after being shot down by Japanese ace Tomio Harachi, Pappy's nemesis. Guest star: Red West
18	18	"Five the Hard Way"	Jackie Cooper	Ken Pettus	February 1, 1977
French gets reckless in the pursuit of his fifth kill, after his father, a newspaper publisher, sends a reporting team to cover his son becoming an ace. Guest star: Kenneth Mars
19	19	"The Last Mission Over Sengai"	Jackie Cooper	Philip DeGuere	February 8, 1977
A new pilot from a politically powerful family claims he was ordered by Boyington into a ground attack that accidentally strafed United States Marines, forcing Pappy to face a court-martial.
20	20	"Trouble at Fort Apache"	Edward Dein	Stephen J. Cannell	February 15, 1977
An Army general begins operating his "flying fortress" bombers out of Vella la Cava. He constantly refuses to have the 214 provide fighter cover, but Pappy insists after receiving orders from General Moore to do so. Guest stars: Joel Fabiani, James Keach, Les Lannom
21	21	"Poor Little Lambs"	Jackie Cooper	Ken Pettus	February 22, 1977
A compass malfunction causes Pappy, Boyle and Anderson to parachute to an unknown island, where they find a Catholic orphanage coexisting with Japanese occupiers. When a nun tells Pappy where they are, he realizes the island is targeted for a United States invasion in 36 hours. Guest stars: Sorrell Booke, Lilyan Chauvin, Soon-Tek Oh
22	22	"W*A*S*P*S"	Dana Elcar	Philip DeGuere	March 1, 1977
It's an all-out battle of the sexes when the Women Airforce Service Pilots (WASPs) take up residence on Vella la Cava, and their leader bans fraternizing with the Black Sheep pilots.
23	23	"Last One for Hutch"	Lawrence Doheny	Story by : Glen Olsen & Rod Baker; Teleplay by : Glen Olsen & Rod Baker & James S. Crocker	March 8, 1977
Japanese attacks on Vella la Cava cause the death of Hutch and damage enough equipment to ground the Black Sheep. With the squadron about to be split up and reassigned, Pappy has to come up with a plan that will force command to keep them together.
24	24	"The Fastest Gun"	Philip DeGuere	Stephen J. Cannell & Philip DeGuere	March 22, 1977
The squadron learns that Harachi survived being shot down by Wiley and is gunning for Boyington, just as Pappy is feuding with Micklin over the condition of his plane. Meanwhile, an efficiency expert has an eye-opening experience when he covers the 214 to figure out what makes them the most successful squadron in the South Pacific.

=== Season 2: 1977–78 ===
No. overall	No. in season	Title	Directed by	Written by	Original release date
25	1	"Divine Wind"	Lawrence Doheny	Donald P. Bellisario	December 14, 1977
The Black Sheep face the first kamikaze attacks, as a visiting chaplain tries to help Anderson confront his premonitions of death.
26	2	"The 200 Pound Gorilla"	Dana Elcar	Stephen J. Cannell	December 21, 1977
Micklin instigates a bar clearing brawl to keep from being promoted to warrant officer. With the 214 fighters experiencing faulty ammunition, the Japanese begin raids on Espritos Marcos.
27	3	"The Hawk Flies on Sunday"	Robert Conrad	Frank Abatemarco	December 29, 1977
The Black Sheep join forces with an Army Air Forces squadron on a top secret mission to shoot down Admiral Isoroku "The Hawk" Yamamoto, head of the Japanese fleet. Wiley has a romance with a young Eurasian woman who is hiding a secret.
28	4	"Wolves in the Sheep Pen"	Edward Dein	Donald P. Bellisario	January 4, 1978
A Navy squadron temporarily stationed on Vella La Cava – with their pet wolf Sheba – causes much tension as the two units collaborate to destroy a Japanese radar ship.
29	5	"Operation Stand-Down"	Philip DeGuere Jr.	Story by : Glen Olson & Rod Baker; Teleplay by : Donald P. Bellisario	January 11, 1978
An officer visits to re-qualify the squadron for combat duty, but his "by the book" testing standards are far different from the Black Sheep's combat experience.
30	6	"Ten'll Get You Five"	Robert Conrad	Peter Lefcourt	January 18, 1978
With the military supply chains in crisis, the squadron turns to a shady sergeant who deals in black market goods.
31	7	"Forbidden Fruit"	Robert Conrad	Stephen J. Cannell & Donald P. Bellisario	February 22, 1978
A talented new pilot joins the squadron, but there are serious doubts about his age. Arriving at the same time, a new nurse causes tension when it's revealed she is General Moore's daughter.
32	8	"Fighting Angels"	Lawrence Doheny	Stephen J. Cannell	March 1, 1978
As Japanese commandos attack Vella La Cava, the Black Sheep scramble to fend off approaching naval forces, leaving Colonel Lard, the mechanics and the nurses to defend the Marine base.
33	9	"The Iceman"	Dana Elcar	Donald P. Bellisario	March 8, 1978
Boyington has to fight an attempt to have him transferred from combat duty when word gets out that a top Japanese pilot who hunts enemy aces has targeted him.
34	10	"Hotshot"	Lawrence Doheny	Donald P. Bellisario	March 15, 1978
A top scoring Army Air Forces pilot is temporarily assigned to the squadron and causes friction with his efforts to increase his number of kills.
35	11	"The Show Must Go on... Sometimes"	Dana Elcar	James S. Crocker	March 23, 1978
After their runway is damaged by rain and Japanese bombing runs, the squadron has to trick a Navy Seabee unit into building them a new one by promising them a USO show.
36	12	"Sheep in the Limelight"	Lawrence Doheny	Frank Abatemarco	March 30, 1978
After the Black Sheep save Eleanor Roosevelt's plane from being shot down, the squadron gets much unwanted media attention.
37	13	"A Little Bit of England"	Donald P. Bellisario	Donald P. Bellisario	April 6, 1978
Boyle gets shot down and comes under the protection of a coastwatcher from England. The squadron races against time to rescue him before he is captured by the Japanese. Guest star: Peter Frampton
