= Baa Baa Black Sheep (TV series) =

American television series (1976–1978)

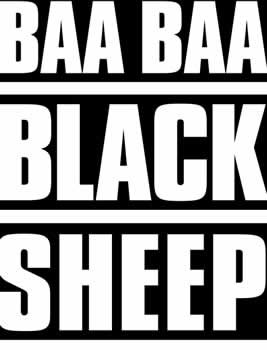
- Logo from the program
- Genre: Military drama
- Created by: Stephen J. Cannell
- Directed by: Alex Beaton; Robert Conrad; Larry Doheny; Walter Doniger
- Starring: Robert Conrad; W. K. Stratton; Simon Oakland; Dana Elcar; James Whitmore Jr.; Dirk Blocker; Robert Ginty; John Larroquette; Jeff MacKay; Larry Manetti; Joey Aresco; Red West
- Narrated by: Robert Conrad
- Theme music composer: Mike Post; Pete Carpenter
- Country of origin: United States
- Original language: English
- No. of seasons: 2
- No. of episodes: 36 (list of episodes)

Production
- Executive producer: Stephen J. Cannell
- Producer: Philip DeGuere
- Production location: Channel Islands of California
- Editors: Jerry Dronsky; Harvey Stambler
- Running time: 48 min
- Production companies: Stephen J. Cannell Productions; Universal Television

Original release
- Network: NBC
- Release: September 23, 1976 – April 6, 1978

Baa Baa Black Sheep (renamed Black Sheep Squadron for the second season) is an American television series that aired on NBC from September 23, 1976, until April 6, 1978. It was part period military drama, part comedy. In the final seven episodes, the character list was revamped, dropping some squadron pilots, adding a 16-year-old pilot and four nurses.

Its original premise was based on the experiences of United States Marine Corps aviator Greg Boyington and his World War II "Black Sheep Squadron". The series was created and produced by Stephen J. Cannell. The opening credits read: "In World War II, Marine Corps Major Greg 'Pappy' Boyington commanded a squadron of fighter pilots. They were a collection of misfits and screwballs who became the terrors of the South Pacific. They were known as the Black Sheep."

== Plot ==
Major Greg "Pappy" Boyington is the commanding officer of VMF-214, a Marine squadron of "misfit" fighter pilots based on the Solomon Islands campaign and Bougainville campaign from 1943 to 1945 during World War II. Pappy often intercedes in altercations of the pilots at the base, but everyone seems to pull together when they are assigned missions in the air. Pappy likes to drink and fight a lot when not flying missions. He owns a Bull Terrier named "Meatball" — which he claims belongs to General Moore to get the dog on the base against regulations in "Flying Misfits", but General Moore says he "wouldn't own an ugly mutt like that."

The series premise was very loosely based on a portion of the real-life military career of Gregory Boyington, known as "Pappy" due to his "advanced" age compared to the younger pilots under his command. (He was 30 when he took command of VMF-214, but in the series pilot, he is stated to be 35.) Boyington, who was a technical adviser for the series, commented that the show was "fiction based on reality" and that no regular character in the series except for himself actually existed, although in his book of the same name there is a General "Nuts" Moore who has similar characteristics to General Moore in the series. Also in the book is Lieutenant Colonel Joseph Smoak, on whom Colonel Lard is based. Lard has almost the same animosity for Major Boyington in the TV series as Smoak does in the book. In the documentary film Pappy Boyington Field, Robert Conrad shares personal insight about Pappy from their time together during the television series. The squadron has many successful combat missions using their Vought F4U Corsair planes against the experienced Japanese pilots using their Mitsubishi A6M Zero fighter planes. The combat missions took place around the Japanese military base in Rabaul during Boyington's September 1943 to January 1944 tour of duty.

Pappy was an ace pre-World War II combat pilot and has the most air victories, or "kills", of any pilot in the squadron. In the pilot episode, Boyington has six kills from his combat tour in China before World War II with the Flying Tigers. His count climbs into the mid-20s as the series progresses. The real-life Boyington had 14 kills in 32 days during his first tour of duty with VMF-214, and finished with 28 confirmed victories.

The TV show's squadron makes its base on the fictional island of Vella la Cava. There is an actual island called Vella Lavella in the New Georgia Group of the Solomon Islands, but in the initial episode "Flying Misfits", Vella la Cava was represented on an aviation sectional chart by the real Kolombangara Island. Under Boyington's command, VMF-214 flew out of Barakoma Airfield on Vella Lavella during the Solomon Islands campaign.

== Main characters ==
- Major Gregory/Greg "Pappy" Boyington (Pilot/Commanding Officer VMF-214) (1976–1978). Played by Robert Conrad.

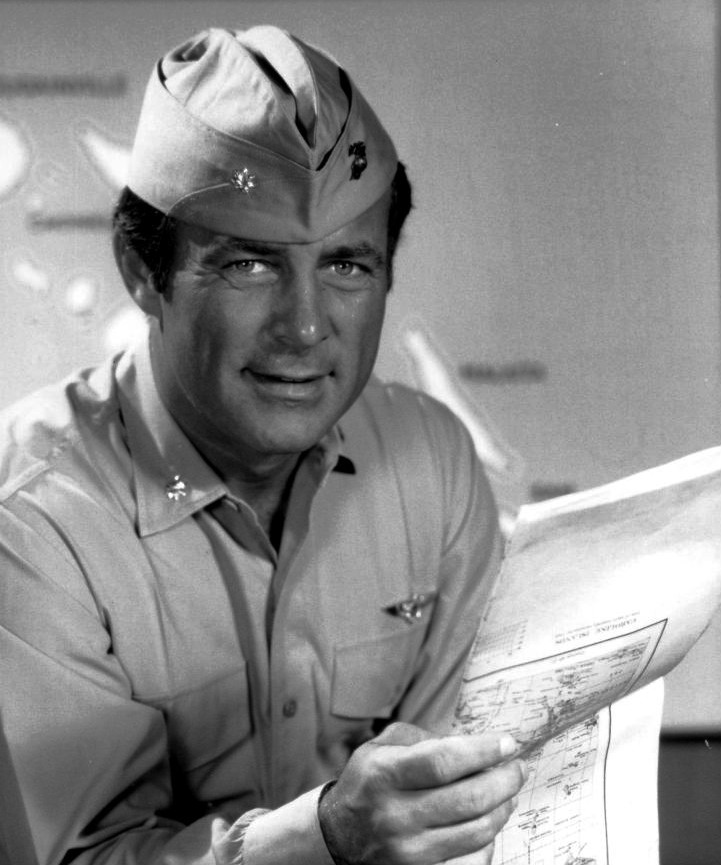
Robert Conrad as Major Gregory "Pappy" Boyington in 1976

- Captain James "Jim" Gutterman (Pilot/Executive Officer) (1976–1977). Played by James Whitmore, Jr., who did not appear in the second season.
- First Lieutenant/Captain Lawrence "Larry" Casey (Pilot/Executive Officer) (1976–1978). Played by W. K. Stratton. Casey was promoted to the rank of Marine Captain in the Season 2 episode "The 200 Pound Gorilla".
- First Lieutenant Jerome "Jerry" Bragg (Pilot) (1976–1978). Played by Dirk Blocker.
- First Lieutenant Thomas Joseph "T.J." Wiley (Pilot) (1976–1978). Played by Robert Ginty, who left after the sixth episode of the second season.
- Second Lieutenant Robert "Bob" Anderson (Pilot) (1976–1978). Played by John Larroquette, who left after the sixth episode of the second season.
- First Lieutenant Donald "Don" French (Pilot) (1976–1978). Played by Jeff MacKay.
- First Lieutenant Robert A. "Bob/Bobby" Boyle (Pilot) (1976–1978). Played by Jake Mitchell in the two-hour pilot, and by Larry Manetti from episode 1.02 onward.
- Second Lieutenant Jeb Pruitt (Pilot) (1978). Played by Jeb Stuart Adams.
- Master Gunnery Sergeant/Warrant Officer/Captain Andrew "Andy" Micklin (Chief Mechanic) (1977–1978). Played by Red West. Micklin was promoted to warrant officer at the start of the episode "The 200 Pound Gorilla", and was made a temporary captain by Boyington while sitting in the brig for punching out a major in a bar fight, resulting in his reduction in grade/rank back to master gunnery sergeant. In the season 2 episode "Fighting Angels", Micklin's background as a mud marine in China was referenced, and he has been described by Boyington as being "part commando, part Indian tracker, and 100 percent mean".
- Sergeant John David "Hutch" Hutchinson (Chief/Assistant Chief Mechanic) (1976–1977). Played by Joey Aresco. Hutch is killed in Season 1, Episode 21 ("Last One for Hutch") by an enemy strafing run during an attack on Vella La Cava. He was replaced as chief mechanic by master sergeant Andy Micklin (Red West), who had joined the squadron a few episodes earlier in "Devil in the Slot".
- Colonel Thomas A. Lard (Executive Officer, Espritos Marcos) (1976–1978). Played by Dana Elcar. Lard, modeled on one of the real Boyington's actual superiors, USMC Lieutenant Colonel Joseph Smoak, is a strictly-by-the-book staff officer. A highly competent career Marine who has seen action in China, Lard is offended by Boyington's frequent disregard for regulations and policies, and the two men rarely get along personally. (The real Boyington and Smoak were bitter personal enemies, and Boyington never forgave Smoak or made any kind of peace with him.) However, Lard sees a lot of promise in Boyington, though he does not admit it, and he often puts aside his opinions to further the mission.
- Brigadier General/Major General Thomas Moore (Commanding Officer, Esprito Marcos) (1976–1978). Played by Simon Oakland. Moore is impressed by Boyington's initiative in "stealing" the 214th and then by the results obtained by the Black Sheep, so he keeps Lard in check as much as possible. Moore was promoted from brigadier general to major general in the second-season episode "The 200 Pound Gorilla". (The actual general officer who provided the real Boyington with support where needed was named James T. Moore, and was nicknamed "Nuts". He and the real Boyington had been "drinking buddies".)

== Notable recurring characters ==
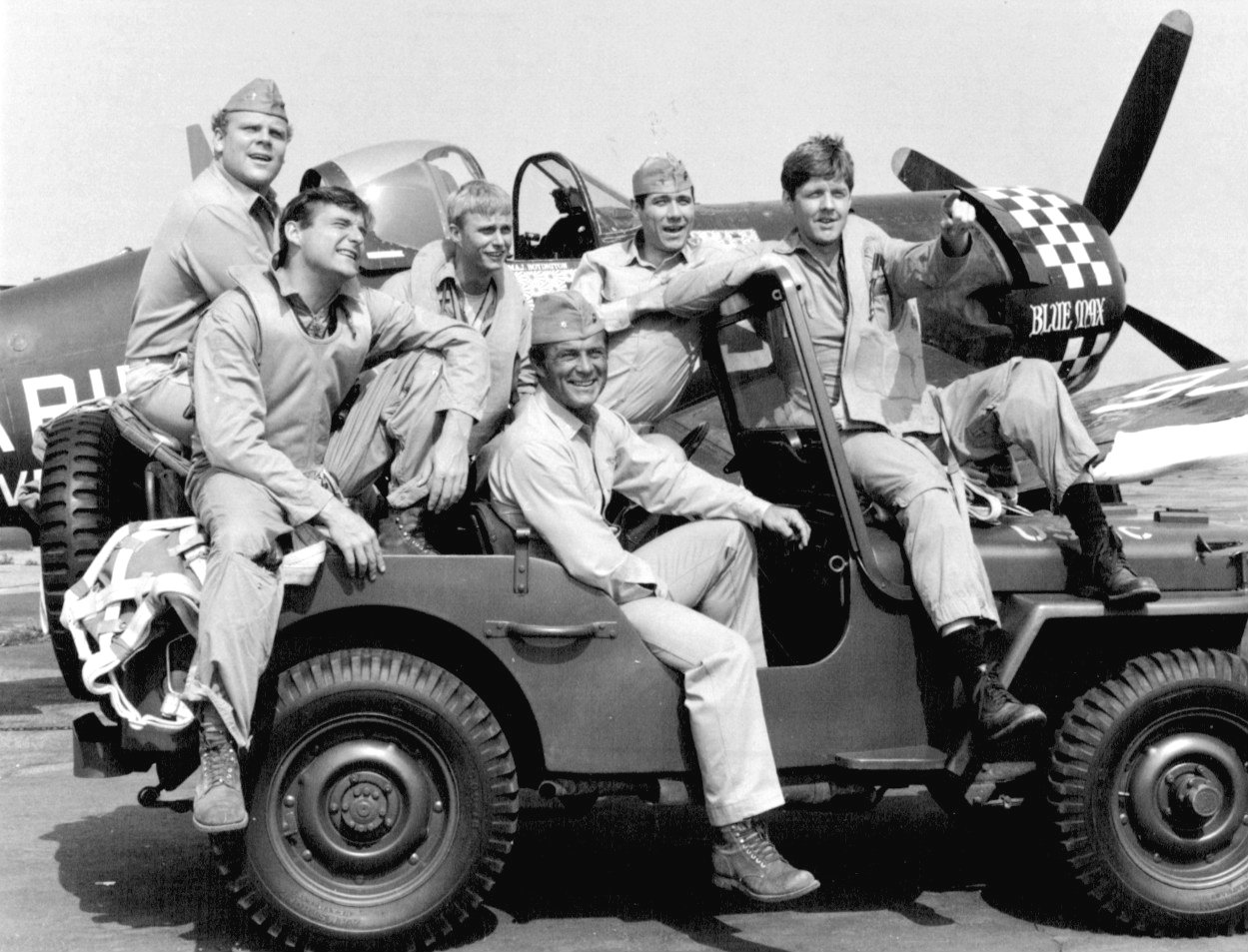
1976 cast photo

- Imperial Japanese Navy Capt. Tomio "Tommy" Harachi (Pilot) (1976–1978). Played by Byron Chung.
- First Commando/Capt. Ishima/Japanese Officer (1976–1978). Played by Marcus Mucai.
- Maj. Red Buell (Pilot, Former Commanding Officer, VMF-214) (1976–77). Played by Charles Napier.
- Third Commando/Ensign Kira (1977). Played by James Saito.
- Lt. Ted Carter (Pilot) (1976–77). Played by Frederick Herrick.
- Lt. Cmdr. Gladys Hope (Head Nurse) (1977). Played by Anne Francis.
- Lt. Caroline Holden (Nurse) (1977). Played by Linda Scruggs Bogart.
- Lt. Nancy Gilmore (Nurse) (1977–78). Played by Nancy Conrad.
- Lt. Cmdr. Dottie Dixon (Head Nurse) (1977–78). Played by Katherine Cannon. Dixon was killed in action during the season 2 episode "Fighting Angels" while defending Vella La Cava against an invasion by Japanese forces.
- Lt. Alma Peterson/Pretty Nurse/Lt. Susan Ames (1977–78). Played by Brianne Leary.
- Ensign Barret (1978). Played by Ron Roy.
- Lt. Ellie Kovaks (Nurse) (1978). Played by Kathy McCullen.
- Doc Roberts/Sgt. Dutch Savage (1976–78). Played by John Durren.
- Col. Tokura/Lt. Miragochi (1977). Played by Soon-Tek Oh.
- Stan Richards/Mechanic/Radio Operator (1977–78). Played by Steven Richmond.
- Lt. Samantha "Sam" Greene (Nurse) (1977–78). Played by Denise DuBarry. She is the daughter of General Moore, as established in the season 2 episode "Forbidden Fruit". To avoid the treatment that comes with being a general's daughter, she uses her mother's maiden name.

== Episodes ==
Season	Episodes	Originally released	
Season	Episodes	First released	Last released
1	24	September 21, 1976	March 22, 1977
2	13	December 14, 1977	April 6, 1978

== Critical response ==
The day of the show's debut, The Washington Post called Baa Baa Black Sheep a "war-is-swell series [aimed] at anyone who remembers World War II as a rousing, blowzy, fraternity turkey-shoot."

== Production notes ==
Although the title Baa Baa Black Sheep comes from a nursery rhyme, the song heard at the beginning of the opening credits is actually the chorus to "The Whiffenpoof Song", written in 1909 as a homage to Rudyard Kipling's poem "Gentlemen-Rankers". One of the squadron's real-life members, Paul "Moon" Mullen, adapted "The Whiffenpoof Song" for the squadron's use.

"We are poor little lambs,
Who have lost our way.
Baa, Baa, Baaaaa."

The name of the island where the real-life Black Sheep were stationed was Vella Lavella in the Solomon Islands of the southern Pacific, known as "The Slot"; this was changed to Vella la Cava in the series. The same was done for the Rear Area Allied Command island of "Espiritu Santo" (Espritos Marcos). The Channel Islands off the coast of Southern California provided an adequate substitute backdrop for flying scenes. Filming of airfield scenes was primarily done at the now-closed Indian Dunes Airport in Valencia, California.

Some air-battle scenes were actually short clips from the 1969 film Battle of Britain, and German markings on the planes can clearly be seen. Other flying scenes pioneered the technique of mounting cameras on helmets worn by pilots, thus providing a pilot's-eye view never before seen in films featuring single-seat aircraft. Because of reflections from the Plexiglas canopies, many close-ups were shot with the canopies removed.

The Vought F4U and FG-1 Corsair fighter planes were leased to Universal Studios by private owners. Many scenes showing repairs on the aircraft were filmed during actual preventative maintenance. "Japanese" aircraft used in the series were actually North American T-6 Texan World War 2 trainer planes, which had been modified to resemble Japanese planes for the film Tora! Tora! Tora! and later purchased by collectors. The Grumman J2F Duck float biplane belonged to stunt pilot Frank Tallman and his Tallmantz Aviation museum in Santa Ana, California. Tallman often stated that this was his all-time favorite plane to fly, with the Corsair in a near-tie. Tallman provided or arranged for most of the aircraft used in the series.

At an aviation history symposium in 2002, members of the real VMF-214 were asked about the authenticity of the TV series. Retired Colonel Henry A. McCartney said the list of errors was too long to repeat. Boyington himself referred to the series as "... inaccuracies, hogwash, and Hollywood hokum," although he did serve as technical advisor on the show, and had cameo appearances in three episodes. A 2001 History Channel documentary, History Undercover: The True Story of the Black Sheep Squadron, depicted some of these differences in greater detail.

As the show originally started during family viewing, CBS asked NBC to edit out the offending material found in the show. A year later, NBC initially cancelled the show, only for the network to reverse decision as a compensation to cancel the sitcom Off the Wall.

== Home media ==
Universal Pictures has released the complete first season on DVD in Region 1 in 2 volume sets. They also released volume 1 on DVD in the UK.

In Germany, ZYX Music GmbH released the entire series on DVD.

On December 7, 2015, it was announced that Shout! Factory had acquired the rights to the series in Region 1 and would release the final season on DVD on May 17, 2016.

On June 13, 2017, Universal Pictures re-released season 1 in a full season set.

Boxset	DVD release date	
Boxset	Region 1	Region 2
Baa Baa Black Sheep, Volume 1	May 24, 2005	July 17, 2006
Baa Baa Black Sheep, Volume 2	July 3, 2007	N/A
Baa Baa Black Sheep, Season 1	June 13, 2017	N/A
Baa Baa Black Sheep, Season 2	May 17, 2016	N/A
