= Joey Aresco =

American film and television actor

- Born: August 22, 1949 (age 77); Brooklyn, New York, U.S.
- Education: Pierce College; University of California, Santa Barbara
- Occupations: Film and television actor
- Years active: 1973–present

Joey Aresco (born August 22, 1949) is an American film and television actor. He is known for playing the role of airplane mechanic Sgt. John David Hutchinson "Hutch" in the first season of the American television series Baa Baa Black Sheep.

== Early life and education ==
Aresco was born in Brooklyn, New York, and raised in California. He attended Pierce College and initially intended to become an attorney. He then attended the University of California, Santa Barbara, where he took a drama class and decided to become an actor.

== Career ==
Aresco made his screen debut in 1973 in the television crime drama series Chase.

Aresco has guest-starred in television programs including Dynasty; Barney Miller; Remington Steele; Baretta; Lou Grant; Kolchak: The Night Stalker; Taxi; Trapper John, M.D.; Cannon; Hill Street Blues; Night Court; The Streets of San Francisco; Jake and the Fatman; Kojak; Murder, She Wrote; St. Elsewhere; and The Rockford Files. He also played the recurring role of Boomer in five episodes of the television soap opera Dallas. In 1976, Aresco played the role of the mechanic Sgt. John David Hutchinson in the television series Baa Baa Black Sheep. In 1989, he played the repentant marauder Brull in the Star Trek: The Next Generation episode "The Vengeance Factor".

In 1979, Aresco played the role of the young operating officer Wayne Randall in the adventure and drama television series Supertrain. In 1984, Aresco joined the cast of the soap opera television series Capitol. He has also appeared in a number of films including Swing Shift, The Big Year and Blonde and Blonder.

== Filmography ==
=== Film ===
Year	Title	Role	Notes
1978	Till Death	Workman #2	
1979	Racquet	Groom	
1984	Swing Shift	Johnny Bonnaro	
1987	The Hidden	Woodfield	
1989	Driving Force	Charles	
1989	Primary Target	Frank Rosi	
1992	Circle of Fear	Joey Conti	
1992	Sleepwalkers	Victor	
1995	Dillinger and Capone	Italo	
1998	Overdrive	Doorman	
1998	Monkey Business	Louie	
2008	Blonde and Blonder	Agent Campbell	
2011	The Big Year	Frank Falucci	

=== Television ===
Year	Title	Role	Notes
1973	Chase	Duke	Episode: "Gang War"
1973	Toma	Bartender	Episode: "Ambush on 7th Avenue"
1973	Cannon	Charlie Dakin	Episode: "Trial by Terror"
1973, 1977	Kojak	Richie Centorini / Sammy	2 episodes
1974	Medical Center	Leo Rivers	Episode: "The Conspirators"
1974	The Streets of San Francisco	Vince Graves	Episode: "One Last Shot"
1975	Target Risk	Junkie	Television film
1975	Kolchak: The Night Stalker	Electric Larry	Episode: "Chopper"
1975, 1979	The Rockford Files	Richie Gagglio / Billy Jo Hartman	2 episodes
1976	Baretta	Biker	Episode: "The Left Hand of the Devil"
1976	McNaughton's Daughter	Jerry Loftus	Episode: "McNaughton's Daughter"
1976–1977	Baa Baa Black Sheep	Sgt. John David 'Hutch' Hutchinson	20 episodes
1977	Barney Miller	Brando	Episode: "Chase"
1977, 1978	Lou Grant	Arthur Locatelli / Officer Filroy	2 episodes
1978	CHiPs	Husband / Niles	2 episodes
1979	Supertrain	Wayne Randall	3 episodes
1979	Taxi	Michael Patrese	Episode: "Hollywood Calling"
1979	240-Robert	Roger	Episode: "Bathysphere"
1979	Trapper John, M.D.	Jan	Episode: "Deadly Exposure"
1980	Vega$	Alberto	Episode: "Vendetta"
1980	Eischied	Jimmy Dayton	Episode: "Buddy System"
1982	Strike Force	Mitch	Episode: "Lonely Ladies"
1982	Dynasty	Ben Reynolds	Episode: "Acapulco"
1983	The A-Team	Presley	Episode: "Bad Time on the Border"
1983	Masquerade	Phil 'Bronco' Banacek Jr.	Episode: "Girls for Sale"
1984	Night Court	Ronald McKenzie	Episode: "The Former Harry Stone"
1984	T. J. Hooker	Sid Beamer	Episode: "Death Strip"
1984	St. Elsewhere	Bruce	Episode: "Rough Cut"
1985	Remington Steele	Morgue Attendant	Episode: "Steele in the Family"
1986	Capitol	Nino Vincent	1 episode
1986	Hill Street Blues	Dominic Donatelli	Episode: "Say Uncle"
1988	Beauty and the Beast	Jimmy Morero	Episode: "The Alchemist"
1988	Santa Barbara	Carlo	7 episodes
1989	Dallas	Boomer	5 episodes
1989	Star Trek: The Next Generation	Brull	Episode: "The Vengeance Factor"
1990	Booker	Randal Combs	Episode: "The Red Dot"
1990	Murder, She Wrote	Rocco Pastolino	Episode: "The Family Jewels"
1990	MacGyver	Nicholas Kasabian	Episode: "Bitter Harvest"
1991	Hunter	Dave Jordan	Episode: "The Reporter"
1991–1992	Roc	Sanitation Worker	4 episodes
1995	Sawbones	Blue Collar Victim	Television film
1995	Piranha	Actor	Television film
1996	Dark Skies	Jack Gettings	Episode: "Dreamland"
1999	General Hospital	Anthony Moreno	Episode #1.9393
1999	Days of Our Lives	Joe Moroni	Episode #1.8555
2000	Dark Angel	Captain Dale Swanstrom	Episode: "Blah Blah Woof Woof"
2001	The Wedding Dress	Auction Announcer	Television film
2002	The Dead Zone	Steve Carrick	Episode: "Destiny"
2002	Cold Squad	Sykes	Episode: "Happily Ever After"
2002	Just Cause	Otis	Episode: "Tonia with an O"
2002	Tom Stone	Paul Chiarelli	Episode: "Cold Comfort"
2002, 2004	Da Vinci's Inquest	Fireman Dunne / Larry	2 episodes
2003	Mob Princess	Jimmy D.	Television film
2005, 2006	Stargate SG-1	Slaviash / Mr. Parker	2 episodes
2007	The L Word	Director	Episode: "Lacy Lilting Lyrics"
2013	The Runner	The Suit	2 episodes
2015	The Flash	Frank Santini	Episode: "Rogue Time"
