= Tequila and Bonetti =

- Genre: Comedy drama
- Created by: Donald P. Bellisario
- Written by: Donald P. Bellisario; Robin Bernheim; Richard C. Okie; Gerald Sanoff; Tommy Thompson
- Directed by: Rob Bowman; James Whitmore Jr.
- Starring: Jack Scalia; Mariska Hargitay; Charles Rocket; Brad Sanders; Terry Funk; W. K. Stratton
- Voices of: Brad Sanders
- Composers: Mike Post (1.1, 1.2, 1.3, 1.4, 1.5); Greg Edmonson (1.6, 1.8, 1.9, 1.10, 1.11, 1.12)
- Country of origin: United States
- Original language: English
- No. of seasons: 1
- No. of episodes: 12 (10 + 2 unaired)

Production
- Executive producers: Donald P. Bellisario; Jimmy Giritlian
- Producers: Robin Bernheim; Jeff Gourson; James Whitmore Jr.
- Running time: 60 mins. (with commercials)
- Production companies: Belisarius Productions; Universal Television

Original release
- Network: CBS
- Release: January 17 – April 18, 1992

Tequila and Bonetti is an American crime comedy-drama television series starring Jack Scalia. The series originally aired on CBS, as a mid-season replacement, from January 17, 1992 to April 18, 1992, with only 10 of the 12 episodes aired. It was rebooted in 2000, for Italian television, with the Italian-speaking Scalia returning as Bonetti.

== Synopsis ==
The lead character of the series, Nico ("Nick") Bonetti, is a policeman from New York City who is proud of his Italian heritage and very fond of his vintage rose-colored Cadillac convertible, which he inherited from his father. After he erroneously shoots a young girl during a gunfight, he relocates to a beachfront Los Angeles precinct on temporary assignment. Here he meets his new partners, Tequila (a large, burrito-eating French Mastiff), and Officer Angela Garcia, who joined the department after her policeman husband's death, which she has kept a secret from her young daughter. Their boss is Captain Midian Knight, who is almost as interested in selling a screenplay as he is in police work. The series shows their investigations of crimes and the evolving relationships between the characters. This show has the peculiarity that television viewers are able to hear Tequila's thoughts.

Life is not easy for Bonetti, due to his remorse about the girl he shot and the strange habits of Californians whom he does not understand. His neighbors include a Puerto Rican psychic, who hears Tequila's thoughts but initially believes she is hearing spirits. Bonetti develops a grudging respect for the people around him as well as for Tequila, who despite his faults is an excellent police dog. The dog is portrayed as having human-level intelligence and a street-wise, sassy attitude.

Each episode has a montage during which Bonetti plays piano and viewers see odd, sometimes disturbing scenes featuring Bonetti's neighbors and co-workers. Some of these scenes are from later episodes, while others remain unexplained. Each montage ends with Bonetti's memory of the shooting of the girl in New York.

== Cast ==
- Jack Scalia as Det. Nico "Nick" Bonetti
- Charles Rocket as Capt. Midian Knight
- Mariska Hargitay as Off. Angela Garcia
- Brad Sanders as Tequila (voice)
- Terry Funk as Sgt. Nuzo
- W. K. Stratton as Detective Lee

In addition, Liz Torres recurs as psychic Gina Garcia, while series creator Donald P. Bellisario's daughter Troian recurs as Teresa Garcia, the young daughter of Hargitay's character.

== Episodes ==
No.	Title	Directed by	Written by	Original release date
1	"Street Dogs"	Michael Zinberg	Donald P. Bellisario	January 17, 1992
2	"Teach Your Children"	James Whitmore, Jr.	Richard C. Okie	January 24, 1992
3	"The Rose Cadillac"	James Whitmore, Jr.	Richard C. Okie	January 31, 1992
4	"Language of the Heart"	Christopher Hibler	Robin Jill Bernheim	February 28, 1992
5	"Tales of the Dragon"	James Darren	Robin Jill Bernheim & Donald P. Bellisario	March 6, 1992
6	"A Perfect Match"	Virgil W. Vogel	Story by : Beverly Bridges & Robin Jill Bernheim; Teleplay by : Robin Jill Bernheim	March 13, 1992
7	"Fetch This, Pal"	Rob Bowman	Tommy Thompson	April 3, 1992
8	"Wonderdog"	Rob Bowman	Robin Jill Bernheim & Richard C. Okie	April 10, 1992
9	"Brooklyn and the Beast"	Jeff Gourson	Richard C. Okie & Robin Jill Bernheim	April 17, 1992
10	"Mama"	Bob Hulme	Tommy Thompson	April 18, 1992
11	"Reel Life"	James Whitmore, Jr.	Tommy Thompson	Unaired
12	"Runt of the Litter"	James Whitmore, Jr.	Richard C. Okie & Donald P. Belisario	Unaired

== Cancellation ==
The series received negative reviews from critics due to the weaknesses of the scripts, California stereotypes, and an embarrassing ambiguity in the fact of making the dog speak in black street jive. It was subsequently canceled by CBS four months after its premiere.

== 2000 series reboot ==
Eight years later, Tequila & Bonetti was rebooted for television with Jack Scalia reprising his role as Bonetti; only this time, the show was filmed and aired in Italy. Bonetti goes to Rome to team up with a new "Tequila", a cross between a Saint Bernard and a Golden Retriever, and the policewoman Fabiana Sasso (Alessia Marcuzzi). Again, only the audience can hear the dog's thoughts, but this time Bonetti is the one with strange American habits, as seen by his new Italian friends.
