= VMF-911 =

Marine Fighter Squadron 911
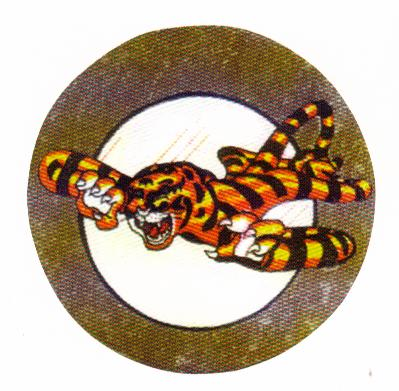
- VMF-911 Insignia
- Active: 25 June 1944 – 15 March 1946
- Country: United States
- Allegiance: United States of America
- Branch: United States Marine Corps
- Type: Fighter squadron
- Role: Air interdiction
- Part of: Inactive
- Nickname(s): Devilcats

Marine Fighter Squadron 911 (VMF-911) was an aircraft squadron of the United States Marine Corps during World War II. Known as the "Devilcats", it served as a training squadron during the war, and was decommissioned in early 1946.

== History ==
=== World War II ===
VMF-911 was formed on 25 June 1944, at Marine Corps Auxiliary Airfield Kinston, North Carolina, under Major James B. Moore. Initial training was on the F4U Corsair but 911 transitioned to the F7F Tigercat in February 1945, the second Marine Corps squadron to receive the twin-engine Grumman (after VMFN-531; see Location and Allowance of US Naval Aircraft, 13 February 1945). In mid-August 1945, led by Major Robert T. Kingsbury, 911 was sent to Marine Corps Air Station Miramar, California from which it was to deploy to Okinawa, Japan to support Operation Downfall the planned invasion of Japan.

Following Japan's surrender, VMF-911 aviators, aircraft, and a small number of ground personnel deployed from Miramar to Okinawa. Upon arrival, the squadron's assets and personnel were absorbed by VMF-312 and remained so until their return to the United States in February 1946. During its time overseas, VMF-312 adopted the Devilcat insignia and nickname. The squadron was disestablished on 15 March 1946.

== See also ==
- United States Marine Corps Aviation
- List of active United States Marine Corps aircraft squadrons
- List of decommissioned United States Marine Corps aircraft squadrons
