= Pappy Boyington =

United States Marine Corps Medal of Honor recipient (1912–1988)

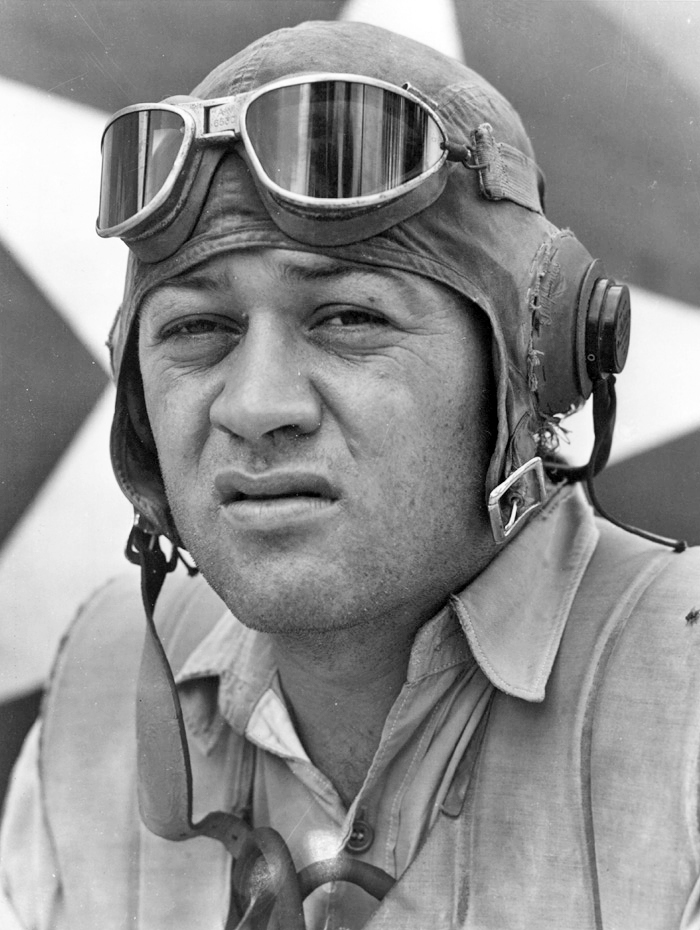
- Boyington during World War II
- Born: Gregory Boyington; December 4, 1912; Coeur d'Alene, Idaho, U.S.
- Died: January 11, 1988 (aged 75); Fresno, California, U.S.
- Burial place: Arlington National Cemetery
- Other name: Gregory Hallenbeck
- Military career
- Allegiance: United States; Republic of China
- Branch: United States Marine Corps; Republic of China Air Force
- Service years: 1934–1947
- Rank: Colonel
- Nicknames: "Pappy", "Gramps"
- Commands: VMF-122; VMF-112; VMF-214
- Conflicts: Second Sino-Japanese War; World War II; Solomon Islands campaign
- Awards: Medal of Honor; Navy Cross; Purple Heart
- Other work: Boeing – draftsman and engineer

Gregory "Pappy" Boyington (December 4, 1912 – January 11, 1988) was an American combat pilot who was a United States Marine Corps fighter ace during World War II. He received the Medal of Honor and the Navy Cross. A Marine aviator with the Pacific fleet in 1941, Boyington joined the "Flying Tigers" (1st American Volunteer Group) of the Republic of China Air Force and saw combat in Burma in late 1941 and 1942 during the Second Sino-Japanese War.

In September 1942, Boyington rejoined the Marine Corps. In early 1943, he deployed to the South Pacific and began flying combat missions in the F4U Corsair fighter. On August 14, 1943, he took command of Marine fighter squadron VMF-214 ("Black Sheep").

In January 1944, Boyington, outnumbered by Japanese "Zero" aircraft, was shot down into the Pacific Ocean after downing one of the enemy planes. He was captured by a Japanese submarine crew and was held as a prisoner of war for more than a year and a half. He was released shortly after the surrender of Japan.

The television series Baa Baa Black Sheep was inspired by Boyington and his men in the "Black Sheep" squadron. It ran for two seasons in the late 1970s.

== Early life ==
Born on December 4, 1912, in Coeur d'Alene, Idaho, he moved with his family to the logging town of St. Maries at age three and lived there until age 12. He was of Brulé Sioux descent. He then lived in Tacoma, Washington, where he was a wrestler at Lincoln High School. He took his first flight at St. Maries when he was six years old, with Clyde Pangborn, who later became the first pilot to fly over the Pacific Ocean non-stop.

After graduation from high school in 1930, Boyington attended the University of Washington in Seattle, where he was a member of the Army ROTC and joined the Lambda Chi Alpha fraternity. He was on the Husky wrestling and swimming teams, and for a time he held the Pacific Northwest Intercollegiate middleweight wrestling title. He spent his summers working in Washington in a mining camp and at a logging camp and with the Coeur d'Alene Fire Protective Association in road construction. He graduated in 1934 with a bachelor of science degree in aeronautical engineering. Boyington married shortly after graduation and worked as a draftsman and engineer for Boeing in Seattle.

== Military career ==
Boyington began his military training in college as a member of Army ROTC and became a cadet captain. He was commissioned a second lieutenant in the U.S. Army Coast Artillery Reserve in June 1934, and then served two months of active duty with the 630th Coast Artillery at Fort Worden, Washington. In the spring of 1935, he applied for flight training under the Aviation Cadet Act, but he discovered that it excluded married men. Boyington had grown up as Gregory Hallenbeck, and assumed his stepfather, Ellsworth J. Hallenbeck, was his father. When he obtained a copy of his birth certificate, he learned that his father was actually Charles Boyington, a dentist, and that his parents had divorced when he was an infant. As no record was found of any Gregory Boyington ever being married, he enrolled as a U.S. Marine Corps aviation cadet using that name.

=== United States Marine Corps ===
On June 13, 1935, he transferred to the U.S. Marine Corps Reserve. He returned to inactive duty on July 16. On February 18, 1936, Boyington accepted an appointment as an aviation cadet in the Marine Corps Reserve. He was assigned to Naval Air Station Pensacola for flight training. Boyington was designated a naval aviator on March 11, 1937, then transferred to Marine Corps Base Quantico for duty with Aircraft One, Fleet Marine Force. He was discharged from the Marine Corps Reserve on July 1, 1937, to accept a second lieutenant's commission in the Marine Corps the following day. Boyington attended The Basic School in Philadelphia from July 1938 to January 1939. On completion of the course, he was assigned to the 2nd Marine Aircraft Group at the San Diego Naval Air Station. He took part in fleet problems off the aircraft carriers USS Lexington and USS Yorktown. Promoted to first lieutenant on November 4, 1940, Boyington returned to Pensacola as an instructor in December.

=== Flying Tigers ===
While serving as an instructor at Pensacola, Boyington punched another officer during a disagreement, and was informed by his superiors that he likely faced a court-martial.

At this time, representatives looking for volunteer fighter pilots to fight in China visited Pensacola. Boyington quickly resigned his commission in the Marine Corps on August 26, 1941, to accept a position with the Central Aircraft Manufacturing Company, which was a civilian firm that contracted to staff a Special Air Unit to defend China and the Burma Road. This later became known as the American Volunteer Group, the famed Flying Tigers in Burma.

During his time with the Tigers, Boyington became a flight leader. He was frequently in trouble with the commander of the outfit, Claire Chennault, and reportedly was disliked and distrusted by the other pilots in the organization, who considered Boyington a "liar and a drunk".

Boyington was officially credited with two Japanese aircraft destroyed in the air and one and a half on the ground. Boyington always claimed that he shot down six in the air, a claim accepted by the Marine Corps.

In April 1942, he broke his contract with the American Volunteer Group and returned on his own to the United States.

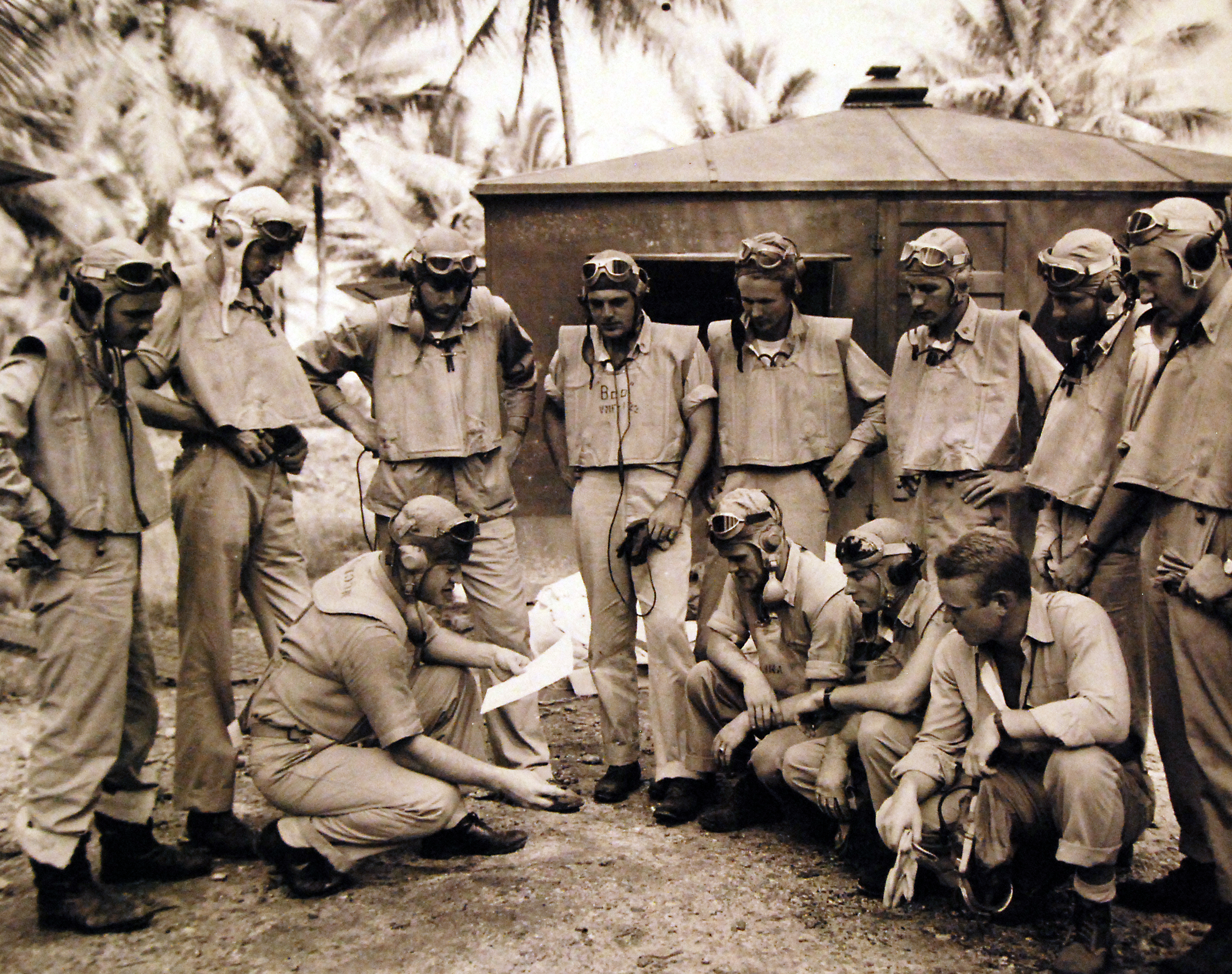
(Lower left) Boyington with pilots of VMF-122 (Not VMF-214, see designation of life vest in center)

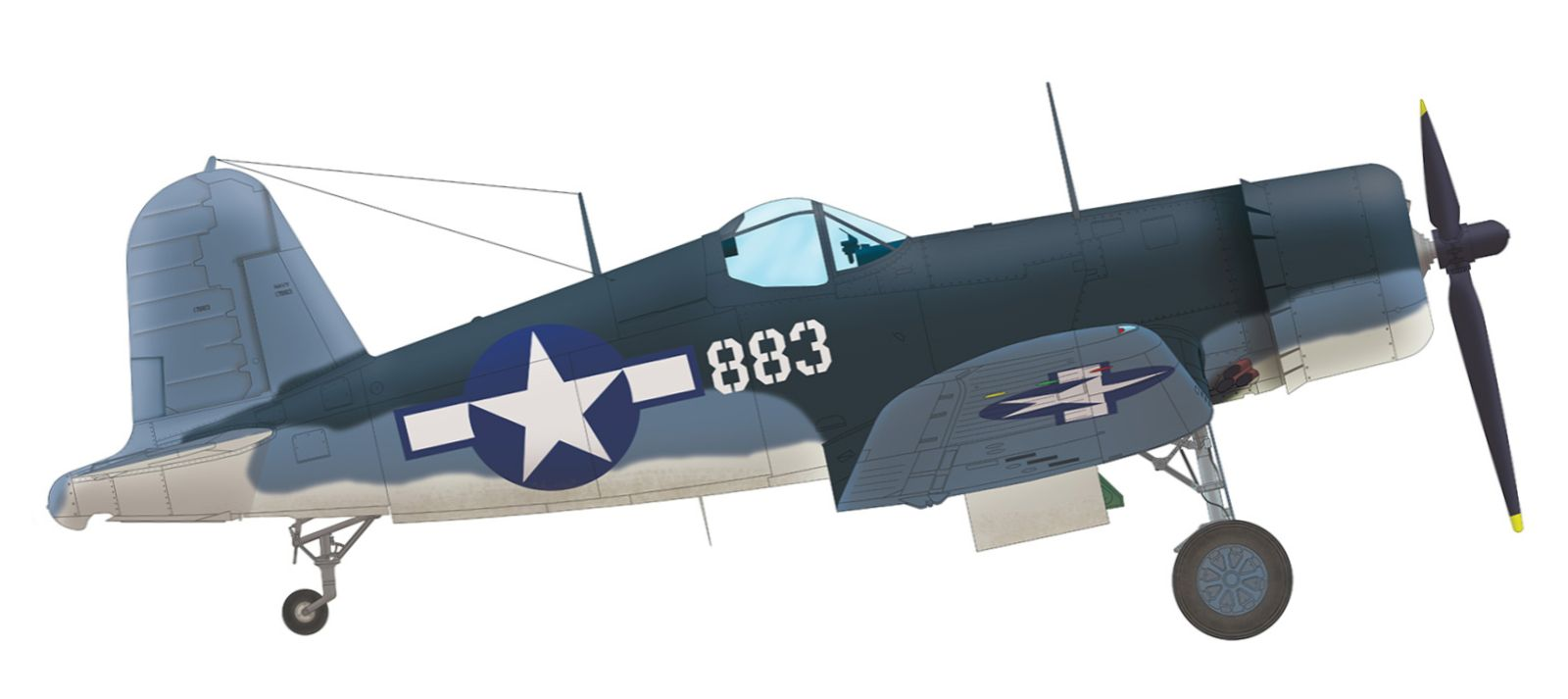
Vought F4U-1A Corsair, BuNo 17883, of Gregory "Pappy" Boyington, the commander of VMF-214, Vella Lavella, end of 1943

=== Return to the Marine Corps ===
On September 29, 1942, he rejoined the Marine Corps and took a major's commission. The Marine Corps needed experienced combat pilots, and in early 1943, he was assigned to Marine Aircraft Group 11 of the 1st Marine Aircraft Wing and deployed to the South Pacific as executive officer of Marine Fighter Squadron 122 (VMF-122) operating from Guadalcanal until April 1943. While assigned to VMF-122, Boyington shot down no enemy aircraft. From July to August 1943, he commanded Marine Fighter Squadron 112. In September 1943, he became commanding officer of Marine Fighter Squadron 214 (VMF-214), better known by its nickname, the "Black Sheep Squadron".

Boyington received the nickname "Gramps", because at age 31, he was a decade older than most of the Marines serving under him. The name "Gramps" was changed to "Pappy" in a variation on "The Whiffenpoof Song", whose new lyrics had been written by Paul "Moon" Mullen, one of his pilots, and this version was picked up by war correspondents. Boyington is best known for his exploits in the Vought F4U Corsair in VMF-214. During periods of intense activity in the Russell Islands-New Georgia and Bougainville-New Britain-New Ireland areas, he shot down 14 enemy fighter planes in 32 days. By December 27, 1943, his record had climbed to 25.

A typical feat was his attack on Kahili airdrome at the southern tip of Bougainville on October 17, 1943. Boyington and 24 fighters circled the field, where 60 hostile aircraft were based, goading the enemy into sending up a large force. In the fierce battle that followed, 20 enemy aircraft were shot down, while the Black Sheep returned to their base without loss. Boyington's squadron, flying from the island of Vella Lavella, offered to down a Japanese Zero for every baseball cap sent to them by major league players in the World Series. They received 20 caps and shot down more than that number of enemy aircraft.

On January 3, 1944, he beat World War I ace Eddie Rickenbacker's record of 26 enemy planes destroyed, before Boyington was shot down, though his last two kills for a total of 28 were confirmed after his return. On that mission, 48 American fighters, including four planes from the Black Sheep Squadron (plus planes from VF-33 and VMF-211), were sent on a sweep over Rabaul. Boyington was tactical commander of the flight and arrived over the target at 8:00 am. He was seen to shoot down his 26th plane, but he then became mixed in the general melee of dogfighting planes and was not seen or heard from during the battle, nor did he return with his squadron. Boyington's wingman, Captain George Ashmun, was killed in action. In later years, Masajiro "Mike" Kawato claimed to have been the pilot who shot down Boyington. He described the combat in two books and numerous public appearances (often with Boyington), but this claim was eventually "disproven", though Kawato repeated his story until his death. Kawato was present during the action in which Boyington was shot down, as one of 70 Japanese fighters that engaged about 30 American fighters. The IJN Forces were the 204th Kōkūtai and 253d Kōkūtai (Naval Aviation Group Formations). The 204th Kōkūtai losses are unknown; however the 253d Kōkūtai reported 1 Zero shot down and Pilot slightly injured.

=== Prisoner of war ===
Following a determined but futile search, Boyington was declared missing in action. He had been picked up on 3 January 1944 by the Imperial Japanese Navy submarine I-181 and taken to Rabaul, becoming a prisoner of war. (I-181 was sunk 13 days after picking him up.) According to Boyington's autobiography, he was never accorded official POW status by the Japanese, and his captivity was not reported to the Red Cross.

He spent the rest of the war, some 20 months, in Japanese prison camps. After being held temporarily at Rabaul and then Truk, where he survived the massive U.S. Navy raid known as "Operation Hailstone", he was transported first to Ōfuna and finally to Ōmori Prison Camp near Tokyo. During that time, he was selected for temporary promotion to the rank of lieutenant colonel. A fellow American prisoner of war was Medal of Honor recipient submarine Captain Richard O'Kane. At Ōfuna, Boyington was interned with the former Olympic distance runner and downed aviator Lieutenant Louis Zamperini.

On August 29, 1945, after the atomic bombs and the Japanese capitulation, Boyington was liberated from Japanese custody at Omori Prison Camp. Boyington returned to the United States at Naval Air Station Alameda on September 12, 1945, where he was met by 21 former squadron members from VMF-214. That night, a party for him was held at the St. Francis Hotel in downtown San Francisco that was covered by LIFE in its issue October 1, 1945. The coverage of the party marked the first time that the magazine had ever shown people consuming alcohol. Prior to his arrival, on September 6, he accepted his temporary lieutenant colonel's commission in the Marine Corps.

=== Postwar ===
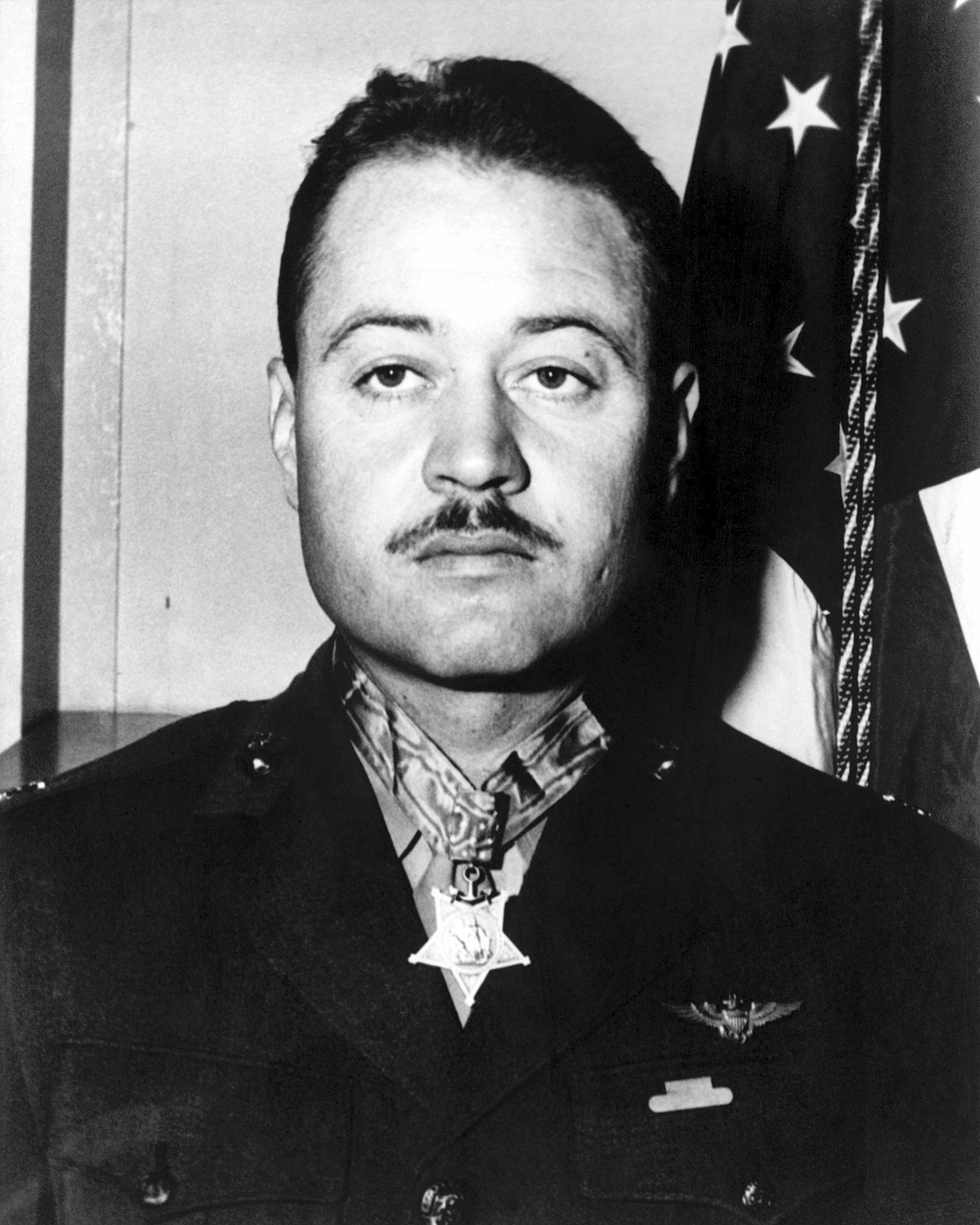
Boyington shortly after receiving the Medal of Honor

Shortly after his return to the U.S., as a lieutenant colonel, Boyington was ordered to Washington, DC, to receive the nation's highest military honor—the Medal of Honor—from the president. The medal had been awarded by the late President Franklin D. Roosevelt in March 1944 and held in the capital until such time as he could receive it. On October 4, 1945, Boyington received the Navy Cross from the Commandant of the Marine Corps for the Rabaul raid. On October 5, "Nimitz Day", some other sailors, marines, and he who were also awarded the Medal of Honor were presented their medals at the White House by President Harry S Truman.

Following the receipt of his Medal of Honor and Navy Cross, Boyington made a Victory Bond tour. Originally ordered to the Marine Corps Schools, Quantico, he was later directed to report to the commanding general, Marine Air West Coast, Marine Corps Air Station, Miramar, San Diego, California. He retired from the Marine Corps on August 1, 1947, and because he was specially commended for the performance of duty in actual combat, he was promoted to colonel.

== Later life ==
Boyington was a tough, hard-living character known for being unorthodox. He was also a heavy drinker, which plagued him in the years after the war and possibly contributed to his multiple divorces. He freely admitted that during the two years he spent as a POW his health improved because of the enforced sobriety. He worked various civilian jobs, including refereeing and participating in professional wrestling matches.

=== Author ===
Boyington wrote his autobiography, Baa Baa, Black Sheep, published in 1958. He wrote a novel about the American Volunteer Group, Tonya, a spy story with characters based on real individuals. Some of the character names were derived by transposing the syllables of the names of the people who inspired them ("Ross Dicky" for Dick Rossi, for example).

=== TV series ===
Many people know of him from the late 1970s television show Baa Baa Black Sheep, a drama about the Black Sheep squadron based very loosely on Boyington's memoir, with Boyington portrayed by Robert Conrad. Boyington had a short walk-on role as a visiting general for two episodes in the first season ("The Deadliest Enemy of All: Part 2" and "The Fastest Gun") and one episode in the second season ("Ten'll Get You Five") of the show.

Many of Boyington's men were irate over the show, charging it was mostly fiction and presented a glamorized portrayal of Boyington. On the television show, Boyington was depicted as owning a Bull Terrier dog, named "Meatball", although Boyington did not own a dog while deployed in the South Pacific Theater. Boyington frequently told interviewers and audiences that the television series was fiction and only slightly related to fact, calling it "hogwash and Hollywood hokum".

=== Publicity ===
While paintings and publicity photographs often show Boyington with aircraft number 86 LuluBelle covered in victory flags, he had not flown this in combat. In fact, he rarely flew the same aircraft more than a few times. Reportedly, he would choose the F4U in the worst shape, so that none of his pilots would be afraid to fly their own aircraft. A publicity photo taken of Boyington in F4U-1A Corsair number 86 was taken at Espiritu Santo (code named BUTTON), in the New Hebrides on 26 November 1943. It was taken while VMA-214 was on leave between their first and second combat tours with Boyington as the commanding officer. Though Boyington claimed after the war that the name of the plane was LuluBelle, according to Bruce Gamble's analysis, it was most likely called LucyBelle.

Boyington was part of the 1981 Black Sheep reunion in Washington, DC, hosted by the Smithsonian Institution's National Air and Space Museum. Reunion planning was initiated by Boyington's namesake Gregory Tucker, son of Black Sheep pilot Burney Tucker. The reunion was scheduled to coincide with the dedication of a restored F4U-1 Corsair exhibit. The dedication program was attended by 18 Black Sheep veterans, museum dignitaries, and astronaut Michael Collins representing the Ling-Temco-Vought Company (successor to Corsair manufacturer Vought). The program included a banquet recognizing all of the Black Sheep veterans. At the request of museum personnel, Boyington climbed into the cockpit for pictures, confirmed the accuracy of the cockpit restoration, and answered a question from a young fan: "Yeah, I could fly it today, if it was airworthy." He autographed the Corsair with a marker pen in one of the landing gear wells, saying, in effect, that it was a Corsair in the best condition he had ever seen. The Corsair hangs from the ceiling at the museum's Steven F. Udvar-Hazy Center near Dulles Airport in Chantilly, Virginia.

In 1957, he appeared as a guest contestant on the television panel show To Tell the Truth. In 1976, Boyington appeared on NBC's The Today Show with actor Robert Conrad and was interviewed about the drama Baa Baa Black Sheep.

== Family ==
Boyington had three children with his first wife Helen Clark. They married after his graduation from the University of Washington in 1934. She was 17 years old. One daughter (Janet Boyington) took her own life; one son (Gregory Boyington, Jr.) graduated from the U.S. Air Force Academy in 1960 and retired from the U.S. Air Force as a lieutenant colonel. His youngest child was Gloria Boyington.

During World War II, his three children were placed in the charge of their aunt and grandmother after Boyington divorced Helen when he returned to America in 1941 after serving with the Flying Tigers. He charged his ex-wife with neglecting the children. Boyington married Frances Baker, 32, of Los Angeles on January 8, 1946.

His third marriage was to Delores Tatum, 33, on October 28, 1959. It was the second marriage for Tatum, and the third for the 46-year-old Boyington. Boyington and Delores had one adopted child. He married Josephine Wilson Moseman of Fresno in 1978. This marriage was his fourth.

== Death ==
A heavy smoker throughout his adult life, Boyington died of lung cancer on January 11, 1988, at age 75, in Fresno, California, and was buried at Arlington National Cemetery. His January 15 interment included full military honors accorded to a Medal of Honor recipient, including a missing man fly-by conducted by the F-4 Phantom IIs of VMFA-321 "Hells Angels" of the Marine Air Reserve Training Detachment based at the Naval Air Facility located on Andrews Air Force Base. Before his flight from Fresno, VMA-214 (the current incarnation of the Black Sheep Squadron) did a flyby. They intended to perform a missing man formation, but one of the four aircraft suffered a mechanical problem. After the burial service for Boyington, one of his friends, Fred Losch, looked down at the headstone next to which he was standing, that of boxing legend Joe Louis, and remarked that "Ol' Pappy wouldn't have to go far to find a good fight."

== Medal of Honor citation ==
Boyington's Medal of Honor citation reads:

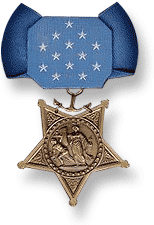

"The President of the United States in the name of The Congress takes pleasure in presenting the MEDAL OF HONOR to

MAJOR GREGORY BOYINGTON
UNITED STATES MARINE CORPS RESERVE

for service as set forth in the following

CITATION:

For extraordinary heroism above and beyond the call of duty as Commanding Officer of Marine Fighting Squadron TWO FOURTEEN in action against enemy Japanese forces in Central Solomons Area from September 12, 1943, to January 3, 1944. Consistently outnumbered throughout successive hazardous flights over heavily defended hostile territory, Major Boyington struck at the enemy with daring and courageous persistence, leading his squadron into combat with devastating results to Japanese shipping, shore installations and aerial forces. Resolute in his efforts to inflict crippling damage on the enemy, Major BOYINGTON led a formation of twenty-four fighters over Kahili on October 17, and persistently circling the airdrome where sixty hostile aircraft were grounded, boldly challenged the Japanese to send up planes. Under his brilliant command, our fighters shot down twenty enemy craft in the ensuing action without the loss of a single ship. A superb airman and determined fighter against overwhelming odds, Major BOYINGTON personally destroyed 26 of the many Japanese planes shot down by his squadron and by his forceful leadership developed the combat readiness in his command which was a distinctive factor in the Allied aerial achievements in this vitally strategic area.

FRANKLIN D. ROOSEVELT

== Navy Cross citation ==
Citation:

The President of the United States of America takes pleasure in presenting the Navy Cross to Major Gregory "Pappy" Boyington (MCSN: 0-5254), United States Marine Corps Reserve, for extraordinary heroism and distinguished service in the line of his profession as Commanding Officer and a Pilot of Marine Fighting Squadron TWO HUNDRED FOURTEEN (VMF-214), Marine Air Group ELEVEN (MAG-11), FIRST Marine Aircraft Wing, during action against enemy aerial forces in the New Britain Island Area on 3 January 1944. Climaxing a period of duty conspicuous for exceptional combat achievement, Major Boyington led a formation of Allied planes on a fighter sweep over Rabaul against a vastly superior number of hostile fighters. Diving in a steep run into the climbing Zeros, he made a daring attack, sending one Japanese fighter to destruction in flames. A tenacious and fearless airman under extremely hazardous conditions, Major Boyington succeeded in communicating to those who served with him, the brilliant and effective tactics developed through a careful study of enemy techniques, and led his men into combat with inspiring and courageous determination. His intrepid leadership and gallant fighting spirit reflect the highest credit upon the United States Naval Service.

== Awards and Decorations ==

Badge	Naval Aviator insignia		
1st row	Medal of Honor		
2nd row	Navy Cross	Purple Heart	Navy Presidential Unit Citation
3rd row	Presidential Unit Citation	Prisoner of War Medal	American Defense Service Medal with service star
4th row	American Campaign Medal	Asiatic-Pacific Campaign Medal with five campaign stars	World War II Victory Medal

== Honors ==
Boyington's honors include:

=== Airport renaming ===
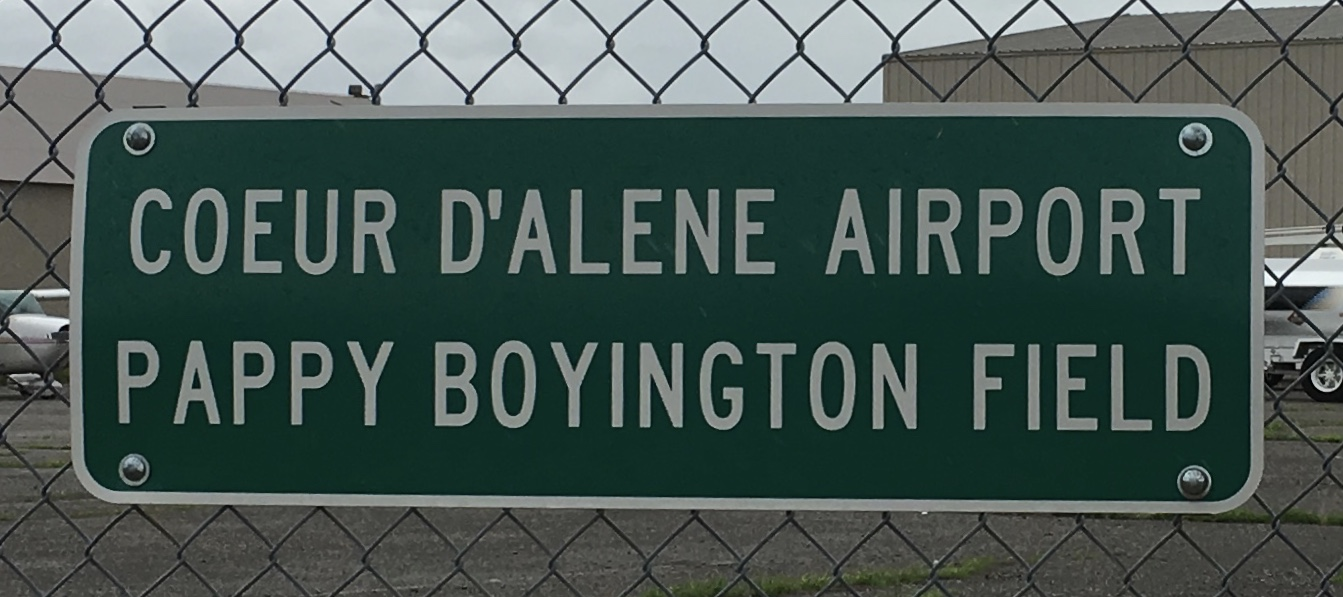
Sign on the perimeter fence of the Coeur D'Alene (Idaho) Airport

In August 2007, the Coeur d'Alene airport was renamed the "Coeur d'Alene Airport–Pappy Boyington Field" in his honor and dedicated the following month. An independent documentary film called Pappy Boyington Field was produced by filmmaker Kevin Gonzalez in 2008, chronicling the grassroots campaign to add the commemorative name. The film showcases many of the local veterans who were involved with the campaign, as well as the personal insights into Boyington's life provided by his son, Gregory Boyington, Jr., and the actor Robert Conrad, who portrayed him in the television series.

=== University of Washington Medal of Honor Memorial ===
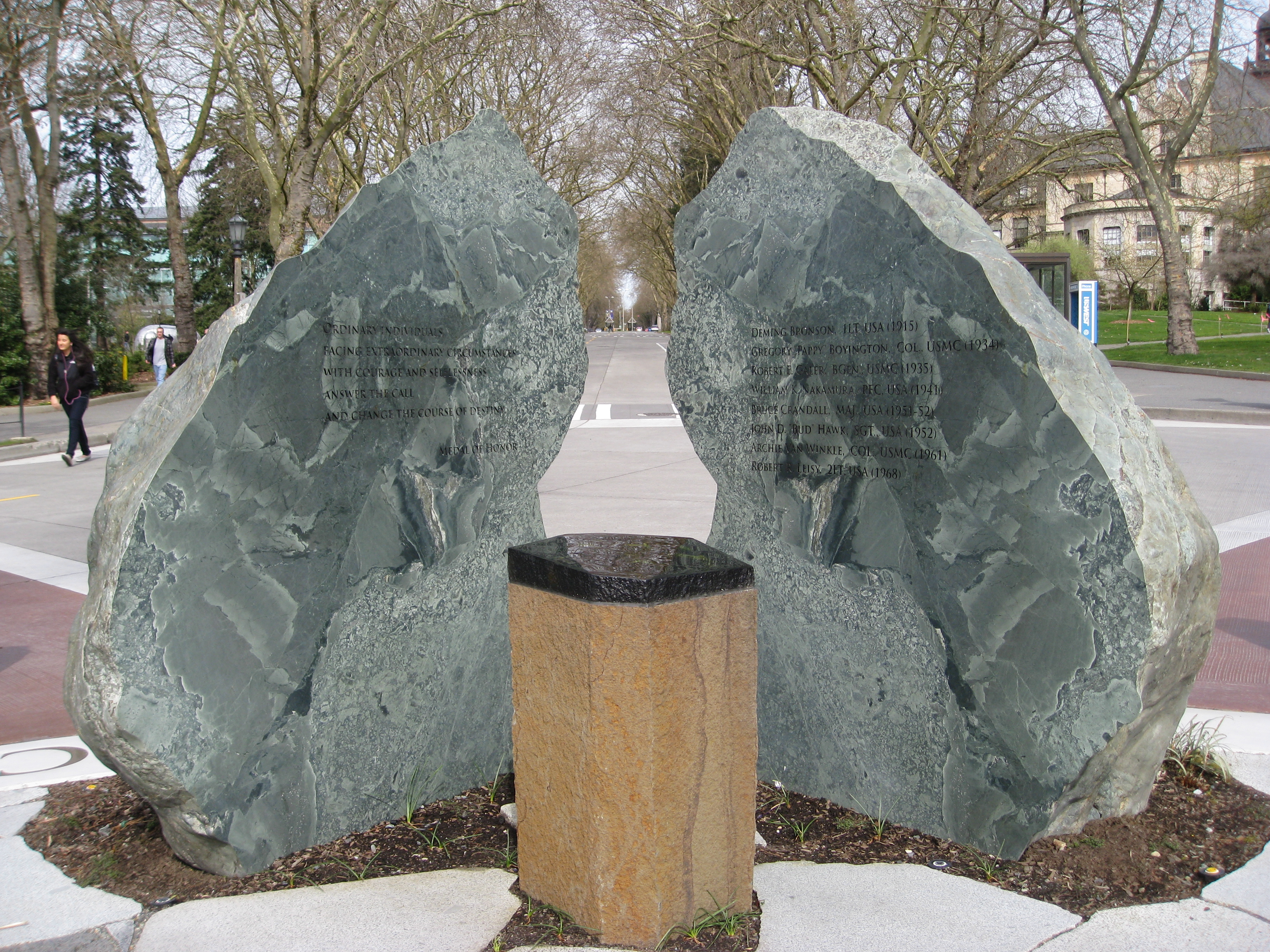
Medal of Honor memorial at the University of Washington

In February 2006, a resolution recommending a memorial be erected to honor Boyington for his service during World War II was raised and defeated at the University of Washington (Boyington's alma mater). Some people did not believe the resolution's sponsor had fully addressed the financial and logistical problems of installing a memorial and questioned the widely held assumption that all warriors and acts of war are automatically worthy of memorialization. The story was picked up by some blogs and conservative news outlets, focusing on two statements made by student senators during the meeting. One student senator, Ashley Miller, said that the university already had many monuments to "rich, white men" (Boyington claimed partial Sioux ancestry and was not rich); another questioned whether the university should memorialize a person who killed others, summarized in the minutes as saying "she didn't believe a member of the Marine Corps was an example of the sort of person UW wanted to produce." After its defeat, a new version of the original resolution was submitted that called for a memorial to all eight UW alumni who received the Medal of Honor. On April 4, 2006, the resolution passed. Privately funded, it was completed in time for a Veterans Day dedication in November 2009. In addition to Boyington, it honors Deming Bronson, Bruce Crandall, Robert Galer, John Hawk, Robert Leisy, William Nakamura, and Archie Van Winkle.

=== Naval Aviation Hall of Honor ===
Boyington was inducted into the Naval Aviation Hall of Honor in 1994, located at the National Naval Aviation Museum in Pensacola, Florida.

=== NROL-82 Mission Patch ===
Boyington was the inspiration for the NROL-82 mission patch that launched in April 2021. ("GPB" on the shoulder patch and an F4U Corsair in the background)

=== National Aviation Hall of Fame ===
In 2019, Boyington was inducted into The National Aviation Hall of Fame in Dayton, Ohio.

== See also ==
- List of historic United States Marines
- List of Medal of Honor recipients
- List of Medal of Honor recipients for World War II
- List of military figures by nickname
- List of people who disappeared mysteriously at sea
