= April 1924 =

Month of 1924

<<	April 1924					>>
Su	Mo	Tu	We	Th	Fr	Sa
		1	2	3	4	5
6	7	8	9	10	11	12
13	14	15	16	17	18	19
20	21	22	23	24	25	26
27	28	29	30

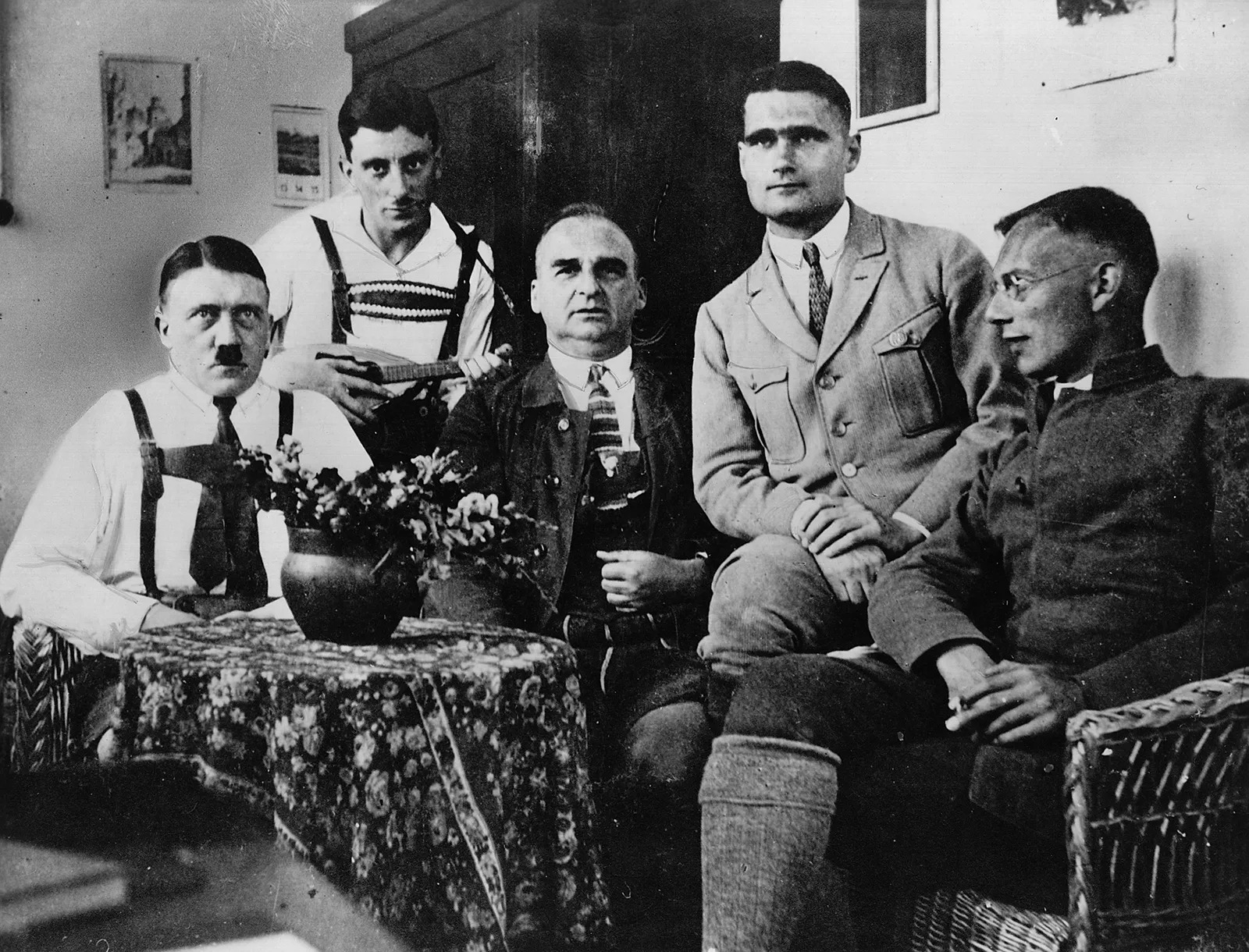
April 1, 1924: Adolf Hitler (far left) and three co-conspirators begin 5-year sentence in Germany's Landsberg Prison

The following events occurred in April 1924:

== April 1, 1924 (Tuesday) ==
- The verdicts in the Beer Hall Putsch trial were announced. Adolf Hitler, Ernst Pöhner, Hermann Kriebel and Friedrich Weber were all found guilty of treason and sentenced to five years in prison, with a chance of parole in six months. Erich Ludendorff was acquitted. Hitler was taken to Landsberg Prison and given a large and comfortable room with a fine view.
- Northern Rhodesia (now Zambia) became a British protectorate after having been administered by a private corporation, the British South Africa Company. British colonial administrator Herbert Stanley became the protectorate's first Governor and took office in the Northern Rhodesian capital, Livingstone.
- The Royal Canadian Air Force, an all-military force was activated by royal assent from King George V, after having been created as the Canadian Air Force in 1920 to operate both military and civilian flights.
- Born: Brendan Byrne, U.S. politician and Governor of New Jersey from 1974 to 1982; in West Orange, New Jersey (d. 2018)
- Died:
  - Frank Capone, 28, U.S. mobster and older brother of Al Capone, was shot by police in Chicago during a gun battle.
  - Clinton Burns, 52, American engineer and designer of municipal water systems across the United States

== April 2, 1924 (Wednesday) ==
- A huge monarchist demonstration was staged in Berlin on the occasion of the funeral for martyred criminal Wilhelm Dreyer, a German who died in a French prison after dynamiting a train in the Ruhr. Police struggled to prevent an unauthorized parade from forming in the wake of Dreyer's casket procession.
- On the Red Sea, the British cruise ship Clan McIver rescued more than 1,200 passengers, almost all of them Muslim pilgrims on their way to Mecca, from the British steamship SS Frangestan, a freighter which had caught fire after the ignition of its cargo of cotton. Clan McIver then delivered the pilgrims to Port Sudan
- U.S. President Calvin Coolidge nominated Harlan Fiske Stone to be the new Attorney General of the United States, to replace Harry M. Daugherty, whom he had fired on March 28. Stone Was confirmed by voice vote in the U.S. Senate on April 7.
- The Italian government announced it was studying measures to take against Romania over its failure to pay its debts to Italy.
- The outlawing of the Bulgarian Communist Party, in the aftermath of the September Uprising that attempted to overthrow the Bulgarian government in 1923, was upheld by the Eastern European nation's Supreme Court.
- Born: Bobby Ávila, Mexican-born baseball player, 1954 American League batting champion and Player of the Year, later the mayor of Veracruz and president of the Mexican League; in Veracruz (d. 2004)

== April 3, 1924 (Thursday) ==
- The Irish Free State issued its own passports for the first time, after being unable to reach a compromise with the British government over whether to refer to an Irish citizen as a "British subject."
- The first all-woman orchestra, British Women's Symphony Orchestra, with 80 female musicians, performed its inaugural concert, making its debut at Queen's Hall in London. Gwynne Kimpton conducted the orchestra, and half of the works performed were by women composers.
- In Italy, the Mussolini government demanded 80 million gold lire from Romania to square its debts within several days, stationing several Italian warships off the port of Constanța to back up the ultimatum.
- By a vote of 408 to 151, the French Chamber of Deputies voted its confidence in the new government of Prime Minister Raymond Poincaré, who had threatened to resign and made the vote a test of whether France should accept a reduction of the German reparation payments.
- In Chicago, 24-year-old Beulah Annan shot the man with whom she had been having an affair in her apartment.
- African-American and Russian stage actress and opera singer Coretti Arle-Titz made her debut at the Bolshoi Theater in Moscow.
- Born:
  - Marlon Brando, American stage and film actor, winner of two Academy Awards (which he declined to accept), known for A Streetcar Named Desire", Mutiny on the Bounty, The Godfather and Apocalypse Now"; in Omaha, Nebraska (d. 2004)
  - Josephine Pullein-Thompson, British children's author known for writing "pony books", the first four being Six Ponies, I Had Two Ponies, Plenty of Ponies and Pony Club Team; in Wimbledon, London (d. 2014)
  - Betsy Plank, American public relations woman; in Tuscaloosa, Alabama (d. 2010)
  - Roza Shanina, Soviet Russian sniper for the Red Army during World War II, credited with her kills of more than 50 Germans; in Edma, Arkhangelsk Oblast, Russian SFSR, Soviet Union (killed in action, 1945)
  - Errol Brathwaite, New Zealand novelist; in Waipukurau (d. 2005)
  - Peter Hawkins, British voice actor for film and television; in Brixton, London (d. 2006)

== April 4, 1924 (Friday) ==
- Educational broadcast media began with the initial broadcast of the first educational radio program, now called BBC School Radio, transmitted during school hours in London by station 2LO on the 860 kHz AM radio frequency.
- An extravagant funeral for slain mobster Frank Capone was held in Chicago.
- The Galeries Lafayette department store in Paris negotiated with fashion designer Coco Chanel and bought the exclusive rights to what would become the most famous perfume in the world, Chanel No. 5, and became the worldwide distributor of the fragrance.
- Born:
  - Gil Hodges, American baseball player and 3-time Gold Glove Award winner, later the manager of the New York Mets during their 1969 World Series championship, inducted into the Baseball Hall of Fame, 2022; in Princeton, Indiana (died of a heart attack, 1972)
  - Paulo Muwanga, Ugandan politician who served briefly as Prime Minister of Uganda in 1985 and President of Uganda for 10 days in 1980 (d. 1991)
  - Noreen Nash (stage name for Norabelle Roth), American film and TV actress; in Wenatchee, Washington (d. 2023)
  - Joye Hummel, American comic book author known for ghost-writing the Wonder Woman series during the 1940s (d. 2021)
- Died: Joseph Willard, 58, American diplomat, U.S. Ambassador to Spain 1913 to 1921, died suddenly from an attack of angina pectoris.

== April 5, 1924 (Saturday) ==
- In the town of Lilly, Pennsylvania, members of the Ku Klux Klan shot 22 people, two of them fatally, firing randomly into a crowd at the town's railroad station. The shooting happened after some residents of the town "played a stream of water from the town fire hose upon the visitors as they were marching back to the station." An estimated 500 Klansmen had arrived, uninvited, to Lilly and held a ceremony at a nearby field, then marched in a procession to the train, which was taking them to nearby Johnstown. After the train arrived at Johnstown, the Klansmen were met by more than 50 police officers, who arrested 25 of the Klan members and confiscated fifty guns. Four additional people, residents of Lilly, were arrested the next day and the 29 were charged with murder.
- The University of Cambridge rowing team won the 76th annual Boat Race along the River Thames.

== April 6, 1924 (Sunday) ==
- Voting was held in Italy for all 535 seats of the Camera dei deputati. The Lista Nazionale, (a coalition headed by National Fascist Party leader Benito Mussolini, received 65% of the votes and 374 of the seats in Parliament (74%) in accordance with the Acerbo Law, which provided that whatever party received more than 25% of the vote and the most votes overall would automatically be awarded two-thirds of the seats. The PPI party of Alcide De Gasperi, who would become Prime Minister of Italy after World War II, received the second most votes (9%) and dropped from 108 seats to only 39.
- In the U.S. city of Seattle, Washington, a team of aviators with four specially built Douglas World Cruiser airplanes began their quest to be the first to fly all the way around the world. Lowell Smith was one of the pilots.

== April 7, 1924 (Monday) ==
- Ramsay MacDonald's Labour government suffered its first defeat in the British House of Commons when it failed to pass, by a margin of 212 to 221, a bill introduced by John Wheatley that would have protected unemployed people from being evicted over inability to pay rent.
- Born:
  - Stanislaw Trepczynski, Polish diplomat who served as President of the United Nations General Assembly from 1972 to 1973; in Łódź (d.2002)
  - J. M. Simmel, Austrian novelist, playwright and screenwriter; in Vienna (d.2009)
  - Espen Skjønberg, Norwegian stage, film and television actor; in Oslo (d.2022)
  - Juan Bautista Vicini Cabral, Italian-born Dominican Republic businessman and chairman of the nation's largest sugar company, Grupo Vicini; in Genoa (d. 2015)
- Died: Marcus A. Smith, 73, American politician who served as one of the first U.S. Senators for Arizona from 1912 to 1921 after previously being Arizona Territory's non-voting delegate, to the U.S. House of Representatives for four terms between 1887 and 1909

== April 8, 1924 (Tuesday) ==
- Sharia courts were abolished by vote of the Grand National Assembly of Turkey, and the Islamic law judges (Qadis) were dismissed.
- British inventor Harry Grindell Matthews made a laboratory demonstration to reporters of his "death ray" that could, he said, disable aircraft engines, explode ammunition dumps, render firearms useless and injure entire armies from a great distance..
- France delivered 13 tons of gold ingots, worth US$6.5 million at the time, to English officers in the port city of Calais as part of France's efforts to stabilize the nation's currency, the franc.

== April 9, 1924 (Wednesday) ==
- The committee headed by Charles G. Dawes submitted its plan to reorganize the German economy and for the Allies to restructure the method of reparations payments. Among the changes were that while the Allies would retain military rights in occupied territory, Germany would retain control of its railways and industries, with some Allied supervision, and Germans would pay taxes similar to the rates of other nations. Payments would be adjusted upward or downward "according to an index of prosperity", with a neutral American observer being the judge of Germany's capacity to pay.
- Pope Pius XI abruptly canceled plans to become the first Roman Catholic Pontiff since 1870 to travel outside of Vatican City. The Pope had been scheduled to travel one-half mile out of the walls of the Vatican and into Rome to dedicate the new building for the Knights of Columbus but decided, after banner headlines in papers in Rome and around the world, to remain "a voluntary prisoner" inside the Vatican. His decision came 30 minutes before he was due to arrive. Appearing in his place was the Papal Secretary of State, Cardinal Gasparri.
- The U.S. state of Mississippi authorized the creation of Delta State Teachers College, now Delta State University, to be built in Cleveland, Mississippi, with the signing of legislation by Governor Henry L. Whitfield.
- Born:
  - Milburn G. Apt, U.S. Air Force test pilot who was the first person to exceed Mach 3, but was killed in the attempt; in Buffalo, Kansas (d. 1956)
  - Elizabeth Weisburger, American cancer researcher and chemist; in Finland, Pennsylvania (d. 2019)

== April 10, 1924 (Thursday) ==
- The first large-scale train robbery in Greece took place shortly after 12 masked and armed bandits boarded a train at the Doxaras railway station en route to Thessaloniki. Among the passengers were the Minister of Social Welfare and a former governor of Macedonia, and the bandits escaped with 400,000 drachmas of cash and valuables. The bandits apparently had been planning to board a train scheduled to carry Prime Minister Alexandros Papanastasiou, but Papanastasiou's train had not arrived at the time that the other train departed.
- King Ferdinand and Queen Marie of Romania arrived in Paris on a royal visit. Though officially only a friendly visit, it was widely believed that Romania was seeking an alliance with France due to unfriendly relations with Russia, Spain and Italy.
- The Dawes Plan committee urged all nations concerned to enact the plan quickly before conditions in Germany changed.
- The Des Moines, Iowa radio station WHO began broadcasting as one of the "clear-channel station" permitted to operate 24 hours a day.
- Born: K Lal (stage name for Kantilal Girdharilal Vora), Indian musician who performed for 62 years until two months before his death; in Mavjhinjhva, Baroda principality (now Gujarat), British India (d. 2012)
- Died: Hugo Stinnes, 54, German industrialist and politician who was the wealthiest man in Germany after World War One until his death, died a month after gall bladder surgery.

== April 11, 1924 (Friday) ==
- Voting was held in Denmark for all 149 seats of the Folketing, the European nation's unicameral parliament. Thorvald Stauning's Socialdemokratiet party won a plurality of the seats, gaining seven to change the balance of power from 51 to 48 for the liberal Venstre party (led by Prime Minister Niels Neergaard, to a 55 to 44 lead by the Social Democrats. Stauning would form a coalition government on April 23.
- Japan's Ambassador to the United States, Masanao Hanihara, had a letter presented to U.S. Secretary of State Charles Evans Hughes, warning him of "the grave consequences" that would come if the U.S. Senate followed the House of Representatives in passing the Immigration Act of 1924, specifically targeted against Asian nations, refusing to increase the quota of Japanese citizens who would be allowed to immigrate to the United States. Hughes transmitted the note to the Chairman of the Senate Immigration Committee, LeBaron B. Colt. On April 19, the U.S. Senate voted, 62 to 6, to pass the bill.
- At 6:00 in the morning, the U.S. state of Arizona closed its border with the state of California, barring all automobile traffic at the two entry points, Yuma, Arizona and Needles, California. Before the enactment of the border closing, all vehicles entering from California were disinfected, at the travelers' expense, as part of a quarantine to prevent an outbreak of hoof-and-mouth disease.
- A crowd of 4,000 Germans at a concert staged a pro-monarchist demonstration in Breslau in favor of having the former heir to the German throne, Crown Prince Wilhelm, to return to Germany as Kaiser Wilhelm III.
- The German Association of Industry released a statement expressing approval of the Dawes Plan.
- Sigma Phi Delta, a professional fraternity of male engineering students, was founded at the University of Southern California.
- Died: Karl Oenike, 62, German landscape painter and photographer known for his detailed information of locations in South America.

== April 12, 1924 (Saturday) ==
- A scandal broke within the U.S. Navy after a radio operator discovered that members of the crew of the battleship USS Arizona (which would be sunk at Pearl Harbor in 1941) had helped an American prostitute, Madeline Blair, stow away when the ship was anchored at New York City. Miss Blair, who had told sailors on shore leave that she didn't have enough money to travel to California in hopes of becoming a Hollywood actress, was found after the ship had passed through the Panama Canal and was anchored off of the coast of Panama at Balboa. The ship's captain instigated the courts-martial of 23 enlisted men. Blair would publish her story in The San Francisco Examiner in 1928.
- Charles G. Dawes visited Rome and met with Benito Mussolini, who expressed his support for the reparations plan.
- The U.S. House of Representatives voted, 322 to 71, to pass the Japanese Exclusion Act.
- France's Prime Minister Raymond Poincaré announced the dissolution of the French National Assembly and President Alexandre Millerand signed the decree, setting new elections for May 11.
- The first international soccer football game at Wembley Stadium was played between England and Scotland, ending in 1 to 1 draw, with Billy Walker of England scoring the first goal.
- Based in Chicago, WLS, one of the major AM radio stations in the U.S., went on the air for the first time after being purchased by the Sears, Roebuck and Company department store chain and catalog merchant. The station changed its name from WBBX to WLS to reflect that it was broadcasting for the "World's Largest Store."
- Born:
  - Raymond Barre, Prime Minister of France 1976 to 1981; in Saint-Denis, Réunion (d. 2007)
  - Curtis Turner, American stock car racer, winner of the 1956 Southern 500 and the 1967 Daytona 500; in Floyd, Virginia (killed in airplane crash, 1970)

== April 13, 1924 (Sunday) ==
- A Voters in Greece overwhelmingly voted to abolish the monarchy and to endorse the Second Hellenic Republic that had been proclaimed by parliament, subject to public approval, on March 25. Out of more than one million people who cast votes, over 758,000 opted in favor of a republic with Pavlos Kountouriotis as president. Only 325,000 supporting the return of King George II to the throne.
- Olympique de Marseille defeated FC Sète 34, 3 to 2, in extra time to win the Coupe de France, the knockout tournament for the championship of French soccer football.
- Born:
  - Stanley Donen, American film director and choreographer, known for Singin' in the Rain and Seven Brides for Seven Brothers in Columbia, South Carolina (d. 2019)
  - Mary Wilhelmina of the Most Holy Rosary, African-American Roman Catholic nun who founded the Benedictines of Mary, Queen of Apostles in 1995; in St. Louis (d. 2019)
  - Renée Firestone (business name for Renee Weinfeld, Czechoslovak-born Hungarian survivor of the Holocaust, later a successful fashion designer after moving to the U.S.; as in Uzhhorod (now in Ukraine) (alive in 2026)
  - Jack T. Chick, fundamentalist Christian author and publisher, in Boyle Heights, Los Angeles (d. 2016)
- Died: David Ivon Jones, 40, Welsh-born South African union organizer and Communist, died of tuberculosis after relocating to the Soviet Union.

== April 14, 1924 (Monday) ==
- Britain and the Soviet Union opened a conference in London seeking to re-establish relations and settle the status of British private property that was seized by the Communists after the Revolution.
- The comic strip Wash Tubbs, by Roy Crane, about the misadventures of Washington Tubbs II, was first published. It would run until May 29, 1943, with Tubbs becoming a minor character in another strip, Captain Easy, created by Crane.
- Born:
  - Philip Stone, English film and TV actor; in Leeds (d. 2003)
  - Gene Trindl, American photographer for TV Guide; in Los Angeles (d. 2004)
- Died:
  - Louis Sullivan, 67, American architect known as "the father of skyscrapers" for his functional design of tall buildings, including the 10-story Wainwright Building in 1890 in St. Louis and the 13-story Prudential Building in Buffalo, New York in 1896. and originator of the "form follows function" principle of design
  - Roland Bonaparte, 65, French explorer and president of France's Société de Géographie
  - Constantine Smyth, 64, American jurist and Chief Judge of D.C. Circuit Court of Appeals since 1917

== April 15, 1924 (Tuesday) ==
- The Japan Times called for a boycott of California if the United States passed the Immigration Act, putting the blame for the bill on that state.
- France's Prime Minister Poincaré, in his speech to open his campaign in the May elections for parliament, indicated "in his own peculiar way" that his government would accept the Dawes Plan for restructuring reparations. Poincaré told his audience, "There can't be a question of retiring from the Ruhr until Germany pays us what is due us", and that he would reoccupy the Ruhr again if necessary.
- Three people were killed at Rome Ciampino aerodrome when a violent wind gust caused the Italian airship N-1 to rise suddenly. Two Italian Army soldiers and a civilian mechanic, who had been holding the mooring lines of N-1, were tangled in the ropes and carried 300 feet (91 m) to their deaths.
- Born:
  - Helena Arizmendi, Argentine opera soprano; in Avellaneda (d. 2015)
  - Neville Marriner, English conductor and violinist; in Lincoln, Lincolnshire (d. 2016)
  - Robert "Rikki" Fulton, Scottish actor and comedian known for the comedy show Scotch and Wry; in Glasgow (d. 2004)
  - Hugh Hough, American investigative journalist and author, 1974 Pulitzer Prize winner; in Sandwich, Illinois (d. 1986)
  - Howard Brown, American civil servant, LGBTQ activist and a founder of the National Gay and Lesbian Task Force, known for being one of the first public officials to acknowledge being homosexual (in 1973, as the Health Administrator for New York City); in Peoria, Illinois (d. 1975)
- Died: Mary Pellatt, 66, Canadian philanthropist and the first Chief Commissioner of the Girl Guides of Canada.

== April 16, 1924 (Wednesday) ==
- The German government accepted the Dawes Plan for restructuring of its economy in return for less stringent war reparations payments.
- Romania announced it had settled its debts with Italy.
- Born: Henry Mancini (Enrico Mancini), American composer of film and television scores, including "Moon River" and "The Pink Panther Theme"; winner of four Academy Awards and 20 Grammy Awards; in Maple Heights, Ohio (d. 1994)

== April 17, 1924 (Thursday) ==
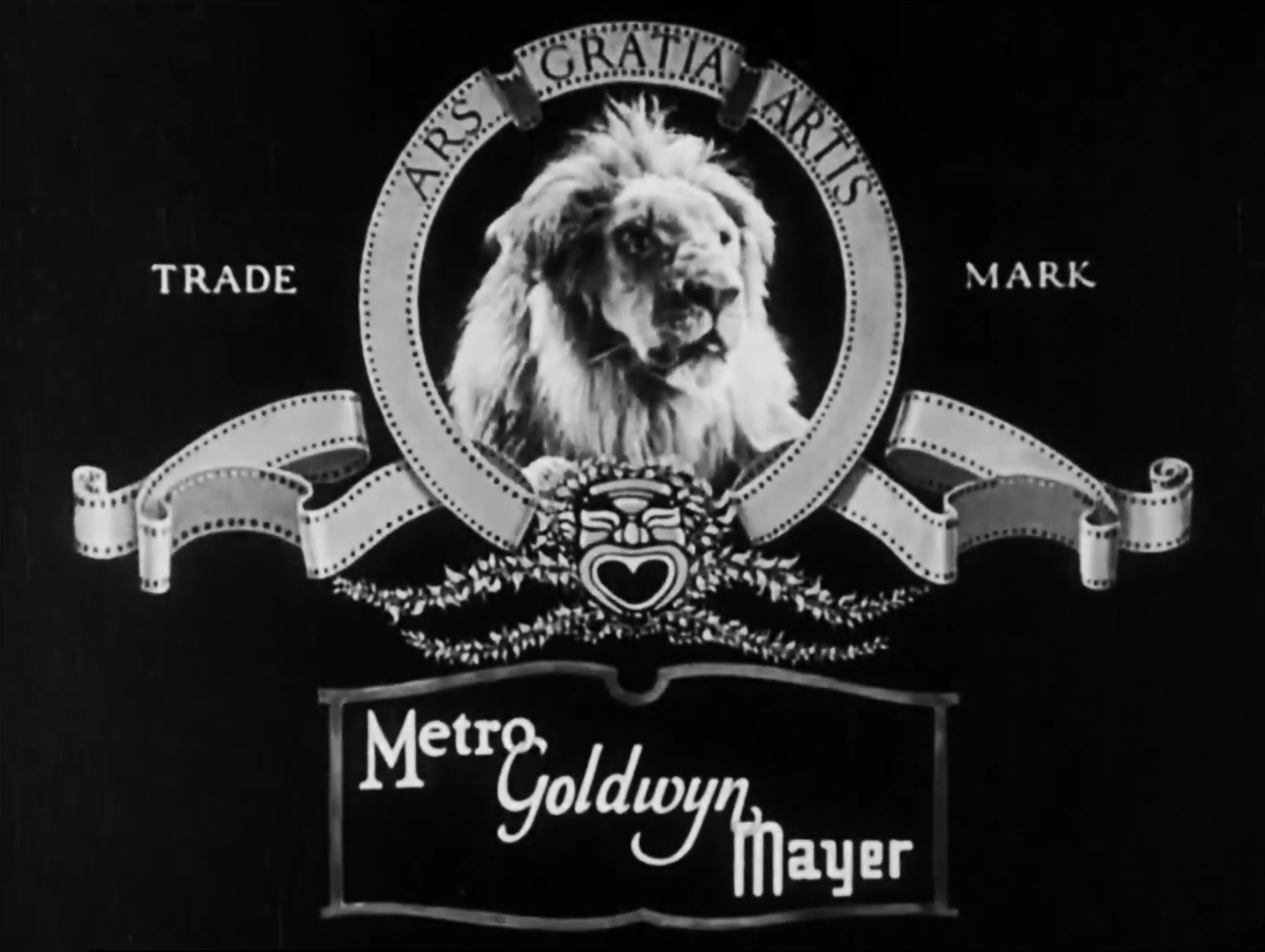
The original MGM lion logo, c. 1926

- Metro Pictures, Goldwyn Pictures Corporation and Louis B. Mayer Pictures were merged by Marcus Loew to create the Metro-Goldwyn-Mayer (MGM) film studio.
- Japanese businesses began canceling orders from the United States in protest against the immigration bill.
- The All-India Yadav Mahasabha was formed to promote equal treatment of and rights for Yadav people, those from India's poorest castes.
- An accidentally-started fire destroyed most of the town of Franklin, West Virginia, after breaking out at Pendleton Times newspaper. The printing press had stopped when its engine ran out of fuel, and the operator failed to wait for the machine to cool down before pouring gasoline into its tank.
- Born: Stephen Taber III, American bee researcher known for the breeding of disease-resistant and gentle bee colonies; in Columbia, South Carolina (d. 2008)

== April 18, 1924 (Friday) ==
- The Plaza Publishing Company, which would become Simon & Schuster, the new publishing company that had been founded on January 2, released The Cross Word Puzzle Book, the first book of crossword puzzles ever published. Although the crossword had been invented in 1913 and the puzzles were a feature in daily newspapers, the book compiled "50 Brand New Puzzles", retailing at $1.35 per copy and included an attached pencil, becoming a popular bestseller.
- Argentine aviator Raúl Pateras Pescara set a new world record by flying a helicopter almost half a mile— 2,415 feet (736 m)— at an average height of 6 feet (1.8 meters).
- A group of 700 frustrated drivers from California attempted to break through Arizona's quarantine closure of the border at Yuma, before being stopped by troops of the Arizona National Guard. After speeding past guards on the bridge over the Colorado River, drivers who made it into Arizona were forced to retreat back to California after encountering a cordon of guards who used fire hoses to repulse vehicle that tried to drive further.
- A fire at Curran's Hall on 1363 Blue Island Avenue in Chicago killed seven firemen and injured 18 others, when the building collapsed and buried the firefighters, all of whom were members of Hook and Ladder Truck Company No. 12.
- Born:
  - Henry Hyde, U.S. Representative known for sponsoring the Hyde Amendment that was enacted in 1976 to end federal funding for abortions; in Chicago (d. 2007)
  - James Scott, Scottish obstetrician and immunologist (d. 2006)
  - Helen "Tiny" White, New Zealand equestrian; in Hastings (d. 2020)
  - Clarence "Gatemouth" Brown, American musician; in Vinton, Louisiana (d. 2005)
  - Harry Jackson (pen name for Harry Shapiro Jr.), American (artist); in Chicago (d. 2011)
- Died:Frank Xavier Leyendecker, 48, German-born American commercial artist known for his covers for Vogue, Vanity Fair, and Life magazines, died of a morphine overdose.

== April 19, 1924 (Saturday) ==
- National Barn Dance, one of the first popular weekly radio shows, was introduced on the Chicago radio station WLS, running from 8 to 12 in the evening central time as an "old time fiddlers program" played by the Hotel Sherman orchestra. As a "clear-channel" broadcaster whose signal could be heard at 870 kHz on AM radio, the WLS program could in much of the North America and was soon licensed to other clear-channel stations. In 1933, National Barn Dance would be picked up by the NBC Red Network, before moving to the ABC Radio Network in 1946, and would remain a regular Saturday evening program until 1952.
- Died: Paul Boyton, 75, American swimmer, water sports promoter and ornithologist, known for creating (in 1895) the Sea Lion Park on Brooklyn's Coney Island as the first modern amusement park in the U.S., and the "Shoot-the Shoots" ride.

== April 20, 1924 (Sunday) ==
- The Turkish Constitution, with 105 separate articles, was ratified by the Grand National Assembly of Turkey, with provisions that the official religion would be Islam, the official language Turkish and the capital would be Ankara.
- The first public Mass offered at the Basilica of the National Shrine of the Immaculate Conception in Washington, D.C., took place at the church on Easter Sunday and was conducted by Bishop Thomas Joseph Shahan.
- Avni Rustemi, an Albanian terrorist who had murdered former Prime Minister Essad Toptani in 1920, and conspired in the February 23 wounding of Prime Minister Ahmet Zogu, was shot and fatally wounded by a supporter of Toptani. Rustemi died two days later.
- The Franz Kafka short story A Little Woman was first published in the German-language Czech newspaper Prager Tagblatt.
- The drama film Triumph, directed by Cecil B. DeMille, was released.
- Born:
  - Nina Foch, Dutch actress; in Leiden (d. 2008)
  - Leslie Phillips, British actor; in Tottenham, London (d. 2022)
- Died:
  - Lou Blonger, 74, American fraudster and con man, died at the Colorado State Penitentiary six months after beginning his sentence. After being arrested on August 24, 1922, Blonger had been convicted along with 19 other defendants on March 28, 1923.
  - Caroline Ingalls, 84, American school teacher profiled in the Little House on the Prairie series of books written by her daughter, Laura Ingalls Wilder

== April 21, 1924 (Monday) ==
- Celia Cooney, "The Bobbed Haired Bandit", was arrested in Jacksonville, Florida, along with her husband Ed, after gaining national attention for their string of armed robberies in New York City over a period of almost four months and their ability to elude police.
- The Ministers and Secretaries Act 1924, a provision for cabinet departments for the Irish Free State, was passed by the Oireachtas, the Irish Parliament, to take effect on June 2. It created 11 separate departments, chaired by the President of the Executive Council, for finance, justice, education, fisheries, defense, external affairs as well as combined agencies for local government and public health; lands and agriculture; industry and commerce; and posts and telegraphs.
- The Fédération Internationale de Roller Sports (FIRS), the first world governing body for roller skating and related sports, was founded in Montreux in Switzerland.
- Bill Tilden of the United States, the number one tennis player in the world, resigned as a member of the U.S. Davis Cup team and the U.S. Olympic team after the rules committee of the United States Lawn Tennis Association (USLTA) issued a statement that Tilden's acceptance of money, to write a syndicated news column about tennis, was an "evil influence in the game" and that, effective January 1, 1925, any player writing tennis articles for profit would lose amateur status and be ruled a professional, in a time when there were no official pro tennis events.
- The Japan Printing Association voted to place a boycott on all goods from California.
- The Buster Keaton comedy film Sherlock Jr., later selected for preservation in the U.S. National Film Registry as culturally significant, was released.
- U.S. territorial jurisdiction for purposes of stopping the illegal importation of alcohol, defined by the "Rum Line", the area 3 miles (4.8 km) from the U.S. coast, was extended to 12 miles (19 km).
- Born:
  - P. Bhaskaran, pen name for Pulloottupadathu Bhaskaran, Indian Malayalam language poet and lyricist for films; in Kodungallur, Kingdom of Cochin, British India (now in the state of Kerala) (d. 2007)
  - Karni Singh, Indian politician and former prince, the last Maharaja of the princely state of Bikaner; in Bikaner (now in Rajasthan) (d. 1988)

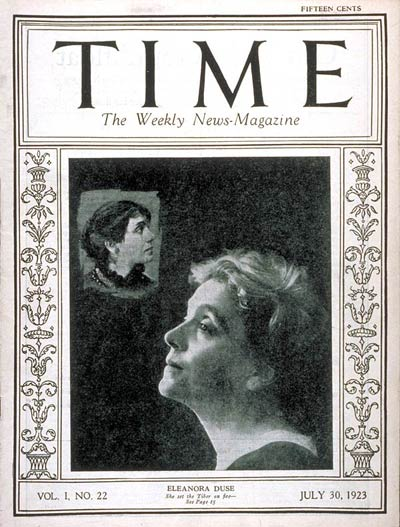
Duse on the cover of Time, nine months before her death

- Died: Eleonora Duse, 65, Italian stage actress and the first woman to be featured on the cover of Time magazine (issue of July 30, 1923)

== April 22, 1924 (Tuesday) ==
- In a luncheon address to the Associated Press in New York, U.S. President Calvin Coolidge proposed an international disarmament conference along the lines of the one that produced the Washington Naval Treaty. After Associated Press president Frank B. Noyes introduced Coolidge with the story that he could "get more than two words" out of the president nicknamed "Silent Cal" and that Coolidge responded "You lose." Coolidge thanked Noyes and told the audience that the AP president "has given you a perfect example of one of those rumors now current in Washington which is without any foundation."
- After having presented his plan for revision of German reparations in his trip to Europe, Charles G. Dawes departed for New York aboard the SS Leviathan.
- The Los Angeles suburb of Signal Hill, California was incorporated three years after the discovery of the Long Beach Oil Field.
- Born:
  - W. Wesley Peterson, American mathematician and computer scientist known for designing the cyclic redundancy check, an error correction code used in digital networks and storage devices to detect accidental changes to digital data; in Muskegon, Michigan (d. 2009)
  - Peter Wason, British cognitive psychologist; in Bath, Somerset (d. 2003)
- Died: Herman Hansen, 69, German-born artist of the American West

== April 23, 1924 (Wednesday) ==
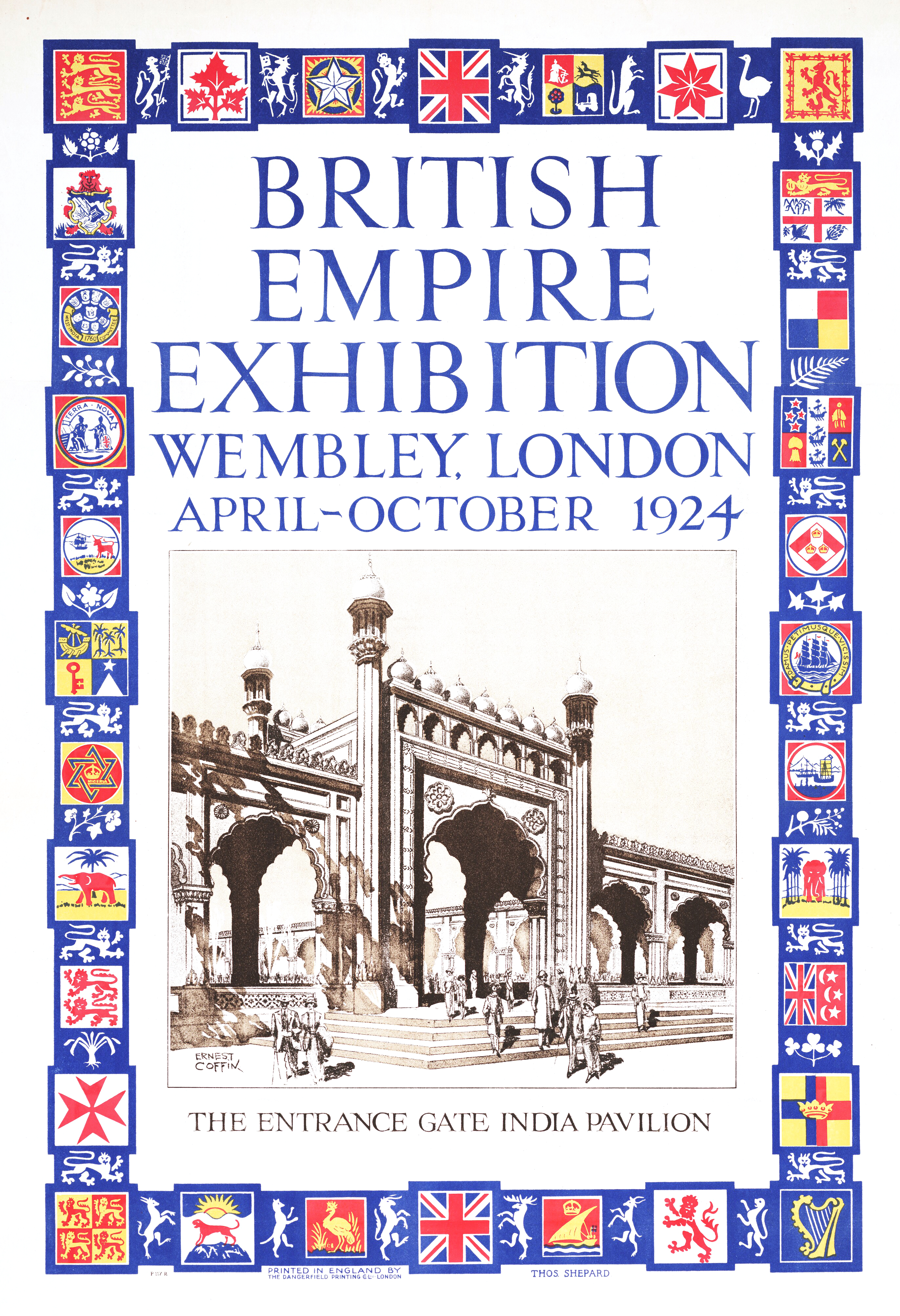

- The British Empire Exhibition was opened at Wembley on Saint George's Day as King George V made the first radio broadcast ever by a British monarch in the opening ceremonies. The King sent a telegram that was relayed by wireless through Canada, New Zealand, Australia, South Africa, India, Aden, Egypt, Gibraltar and back to London in 1 minute and 20 seconds.
- The Grand National Assembly of Turkey approved a list of "150 personae non gratae of Turkey", after narrowing a list of 600 Ottoman officials exiled from Turkey, to 150 Yüzellilikler ("150ers") who were forbidden from returning to the Turkish Republic, starting with former Sultan Mehmed VI.
- Thorvald Stauning formed a coalition government to become the new Prime Minister of Denmark, succeeding Niels Neergaard, whose party had lost control of the Folketing in the April 11 elections.
- Born: Bobby Rosengarden, American jazz drummer; in Elgin, Illinois (d. 2007)
- Died: Karl Helfferich, 51, German economist and former Vice-Chancellor of the German Empire, was killed near Bellinzona in a train wreck in Switzerland that claimed the lives of 14 other people.

== April 24, 1924 (Thursday) ==
- Thorvald Stauning became the new Prime Minister of Denmark, succeeding Niels Neergaard after the Socialdemokratiet party obtained a plurality of seats in the April 11 elections for the Folketing.
- In Leningrad, hundreds of Russian Orthodox worshipers unsuccessfully attempted to stop police from confiscating religious icons from Saint Andrew's Cathedral. As punishment, the Soviet government turned the cathedral over to the Soviet-sponsored Renovationist Church that promoted a pro-Communist interpretation of Christianity.
- Voters in the Dallas County neighborhood of University Park, located adjacent to Southern Methodist University, voted overwhelmingly to incorporate as the city of University Park, Texas.
- The Royal Dutch Airline, KLM, had its first fatal accident when a KLM Fokker F.III airplane, carrying a pilot and two passengers, vanished shortly after takeoff from Croydon Airport in England on a flight to the Waalhaven, a suburb of Rotterdam in the Netherlands. No trace of the plane was found; the aircraft had apparently crashed in the English Channel.
- Born:
  - Clement Freud, Gernab broadcaster, radio personality and politician; in Berlin (d. 2009)
  - Clive King, English writer; in Richmond, Surrey (d. 2018)
  - Nahuel Moreno (alias for Hugo Bressano), Argentine Trotskyist leader; in América, Buenos Aires (d. 1987)
  - Riley Anthony "Tony" Rudd, British stockbroker and entrepreneur; in Wandsworth, London (d. 2017)
- Died:
  - G. Stanley Hall, 78, American psychologist who was the first person in the U.S. to earn a doctorate in psychology, as well as being the first president of the American Psychological Association
  - Nikolai Kravkov, 59, Soviet Russian pharmacologist

== April 25, 1924 (Friday) ==
- The Belgian government accepted the Dawes Plan.
- Born: Joe Gandara, Hispanic-American U.S. Army private who was found entitled to the Medal of Honor almost 70 years after his death during the Normandy Invasion; in Santa Monica, California (killed in action, 1944)
- Died:
  - Charles Francis Murphy, 65, American political boss for Tammany Hall in New York City since 1902, died of a heart attack attributed to "acute indigestion."
  - E. J. Edwards, 76, American investigative reporter and columnist

== April 26, 1924 (Saturday) ==
- Part 2 of the Fritz Lang fantasy film Die Nibelungen premiered at the Ufa-Palast am Zoo in Berlin.
- Newcastle United beat Aston Villa 2–0 to win the 1924 FA Cup.
- The first performance of Tzigane, a rhapsody by French composer Maurice Ravel, took place at a premiere at the Aeolian Hall in London.
- Born: Guy Moquet, French Communist and martyr of the French anti-Nazi resistance during World War II; in Paris (executed, 1941)

== April 27, 1924 (Sunday) ==
- Germany's government issued a proclamation warning the German people against extremists who opposed the Dawes Plan, saying that it was the only way to save the country, and its rejection might lead to a crisis that would cause another world war.

== April 28, 1924 (Monday) ==
- An explosion and toxic gas killed 119 coal miners working in Benwood, West Virginia.
- Warren T. McCray, the incumbent Governor of the U.S. state of Indiana, was booked into the Marion County Jail in Indianapolis at 9:40 in the evening, after having been found guilty of attempted fraud by a U.S. federal court jury earlier in the day.
- Born: Kenneth Kaunda, the first President of Zambia, who served from 1964 to 1991; in Chinsali, Northern Rhodesia (d. 2021)

== April 29, 1924 (Tuesday) ==
- Voting was held for white residents of the British African colony of Southern Rhodesia (now the Republic of Zimbabwe) for the first elected colonial legislature, the 30-member Legislative Assembly. The Rhodesia Party, led by the Premier, Sir Charles Coghlan, won 26 of the seats, while independent candidates won the other four. The Rhodesia Labour Party of Lawrence Keller lost in all 22 constituencies in which it had candidates.
- Philip Snowden, the British Chancellor of the Exchequer, presented the Labour government's first budget.
- Born:
  - Svante Odén, Swedish meteorologist who researched and publicized the causes of acid rain; in Östermalm, Stockholm (disappeared 1986)
  - Shintaro Abe, Japanese Foreign Minister 1982 to 1986; in Tokyo (d. 1991)
  - Al Balding, Canadian golfer who was the first native of Canada to win a PGA event; in Toronto (d. 2006)
  - Ann Flagg, African-American actress and playwright; in Charleston, West Virginia (d. 1970)
- Died:
  - Julian S. Carr, 78, American businessman, philanthropist and white supremacist, former Commander-in-Chief of the United Confederate Veterans, died in Chicago after contracting influenza while traveling from his home in Durham, North Carolina.
  - Dr. E. F. Nichols, 54, American scientist and former president of Dartmouth College and of MIT, died in Washington D. C., while reading a research paper to an audience during dedication ceremonies for the new National Academy of Sciences headquarters.

== April 30, 1924 (Wednesday) ==
- An outbreak of tornadoes killed 111 people across five states in the southern U.S., with 76 deaths in South Carolina, primarily in a storm that swept through Richland County and Sumter County. Another 16 died in Georgia and 13 in Alabama.
- Warren T. McCray resigned as Governor of the U.S. state of Indiana after being convicted in a federal criminal trial for mail fraud and sentenced to 10 years in prison. McCray was succeeded by Lieutenant Governor Emmett Forest Branch, to serve out the remaining 8½ months of McCray's term.
- Over 10,000 people attended the funeral of slain Albanian nationalist figure Avni Rustemi in Vlorë. Bishop Fan Noli gave a fiery speech which emboldened opposition against the government and led to the June Revolution.
- An armed revolt broke out in Cienfuegos in Cuba, under the leadership of General Laredo Bru in Santa Clara. Within two weeks, most of the rebels returned home after being offered amnesty by President Zayas.
- Air mail service was inaugurated between Liverpool in England and Belfast in Northern Ireland.
- The lead plane in the round-the-world flight attempt, Seattle, crashed in a dense fog near Port Moller, Alaska. The crew was rescued.
- Born:
  - Sheldon Harnick, American lyricist best known for the musical Fiddler on the Roof in collaboration with music composer Jerry Bock; in Chicago (d. 2023)
  - Masatoshi Ito, Japanese businessman and founder of the Ito-Yokado grocery and department store chain; in Tokyo (d. 2023)
  - Ruth Printz Greenglass, American spy who was convicted of espionage along with her husband David Greenglass; in New York City (d. 2008)
