= Ann Flagg =

American dramatist

- Ann Flagg on the set of Great Gettin' up Mornin'
- Born: April 29, 1924; Charleston
- Died: October 27, 1970; Illinois

Ann Kathryn Flagg (April 29, 1924 – October 27, 1970) was an American playwright, stage actress and drama teacher, whose works deal with the 19th and 20th century African-American experience. She is best known for her play Great Gettin' up Mornin', aired by CBS television in 1964.

== Life and career ==
Ann Flagg was born on April 29, 1924, in Charleston, West Virginia, to Frances Thomas and Francis Flagg, young parents who split up during Flagg's childhood.

In 1941, she graduated from Garnet High School, where she excelled in drama and participated in the West Virginia State College summer theater program. She then attended West Virginia State College, graduating magna cum laude in 1945 with an education degree. At WVSC, she joined the West Virginia State Players and served as their president for a semester, appearing in plays like The Shining Hour and The Little Foxes.

Following graduation, she taught for two years at Northampton County High School in Machipongo, Virginia, where she took a group of students to second place in the Virginia State College Players' Tournament. She then toured for a year with the American Negro Repertory Players. She returned to teaching at Dunbar High School in Fairmont, West Virginia, where she supplemented her education with speech classes at the University of Pittsburgh so she could teach speech in addition to drama, English, and Spanish.

In 1952, she became director of the Children's Theater at Karamu House, a prestigious, integrated experimental theater in Cleveland, Ohio, where over the next nine years she cast, directed, and produced numerous plays and ballets with children. Colleagues called her classroom "The Magic Carpet Room" because it contained "magic that lifted minds and hearts to mountain tops." She also appeared as an actress in adult plays, including Antigone and Lysistrata, where her performances were lauded.

From 1961 to 1963 she was enrolled in the master's degree program in theater at Northwestern University. While there she finished her most famous play, Great Gettin' up Mornin', in 1963, which won first prize in the Samuel French annual National Collegiate Playwriting Contest. The contest brought the play to the attention of the show CBS Repertoire Workshop, which produced and aired the play in 1964, starring Nichelle Nichols and Don Marshall. In January of that year, Flagg was flown out to Hollywood to assist with script changes, rehearsal, and production.

While at Northwestern, she began teaching drama part time with Evanston Consolidated School District, and went to full time when she graduated. She taught at the Foster School, which became a magnet school called the King Lab. The school auditorium is now named for her.

In 1966, she spent a year teaching drama at Southern Illinois University Carbondale, but health problems and racist colleagues prompted her to return to Evanston the next year. She died suddenly of an attack of bronchial emphysema in 1970.

== Works ==
- Great Gettin' up Mornin' (1963) - Flagg's most famous work deals with a couple wrestling with the decision of whether or not to send their six year old daughter to a newly integrated school in the face of harassment and threats of violence. She wrote it as an exercise in "tension and economy of words, paring it down to the bear bones" and said "I liked the idea of a family under stress making a momentous decision in an hour and a half." The play's title comes from a spiritual.
- Blueboy to Holiday - Over - This play depicts the friendship between two eight year old boys, one white, one black.
- A Significant Statistic - The life of a fictional murdered civil rights worker, Jack Davis, is depicted in this work.
- Unto the Least of These - Inspired by a tombstone Flagg saw in the Oberlin College library of a four year old fugitive slave, this play depicts an underground railroad station in 1853.
- The Young Shall Die (unfinished) - Based on a poem by Carl Sandberg, it was unfinished at Flagg's death.
