= Brackebusch =

Brackebusch or Brakebusch is a German-based surname:

- Johann Georg Ludwig Brackebusch (1768–1835), German Lutheran theologian
- Georg Friedrich Brackebusch (1799–1883), German Freemason, entrepreneur, and politician, Member of the Frankfurt National Assembly
- Hans Brackebusch (1808–1880), German theologian and politician, member of the Erfurt Union Parliament
- Ludwig Brackebusch (1849–1906), German geologist
- Lotte Brackebusch (1898–1978), German actress and radio play narrator
- Gabriele Brakebusch (1954), German politician (CDU) and member of the Landtag of Saxony-Anhalt
