= Peter Shirley =

American computer scientist (born 1963)

- Born: June 11, 1963 (age 63); Evanston, Illinois, United States
- Education: Reed College; University of Illinois, Urbana-Champaign
- Scientific career
- Fields: Computer graphics
- Workplaces: Indiana University; Cornell University; University of Utah; NVIDIA
- Thesis: Physically based lighting calculations for computer graphics (1991)
- Doctoral advisor: William Kubitz
- Website: https://www.petershirley.com/

Peter Shirley (born June 11, 1963) is an American computer scientist and computer graphics researcher. He is a Distinguished Scientist at NVIDIA and adjunct professor at the University of Utah in computer science. He has made extensive contributions to interactive photorealistic rendering. His textbook, Fundamentals of Computer Graphics, is considered one of the leading introductory texts on computer graphics and is currently in the fifth edition.

== Biography ==
Shirley was born on June 11, 1963, in Evanston, Illinois. He attended the Dr. Martin Luther King, Jr., Lab School (now the Dr. Martin Luther King Jr. Literary and Fine Arts School), Nichols Middle School, and Evanston Township High School. After one semester at the University of Illinois at Urbana-Champaign, he transferred to Reed College in Portland, Oregon, where received his BA in physics in 1985, and then received his PhD in computer science from the University of Illinois, Urbana-Champaign in 1991. He then joined the faculty at Indiana University as an assistant professor. From 1994 to 1996 he was a visiting professor at Cornell University. He then joined the faculty at the University of Utah, where he taught until 2008 when he joined NVIDIA as a research scientist.

== Books ==
- P. Shirley, Ray Tracing in One Weekend. 2016. Amazon Kindle books.
- S. Marschner and P. Shirley, Fundamentals of Computer Graphics, 4th Ed. 2015. Taylor & Francis.
- P. Shirley and S. Marschner, Fundamentals of Computer Graphics, 3rd Ed. 2009. AK Peters.
- K. Sung, P. Shirley, S. Baer. Essentials of Interactive Computer Graphics, 2008. AK Peters
- P. Shirley, Fundamentals of Computer Graphics, 2nd Ed. 2005. AK Peters.
- P. Shirley, R. Morley, Realistic Ray Tracing, 2nd Ed. 2003. AK Peters.
- P. Shirley, Fundamentals of Computer Graphics. 2002. AK Peters.
- P. Shirley, Realistic Ray Tracing. 2000. AK Peters.
