= Karl Oenike =

German painter (1862–1924)

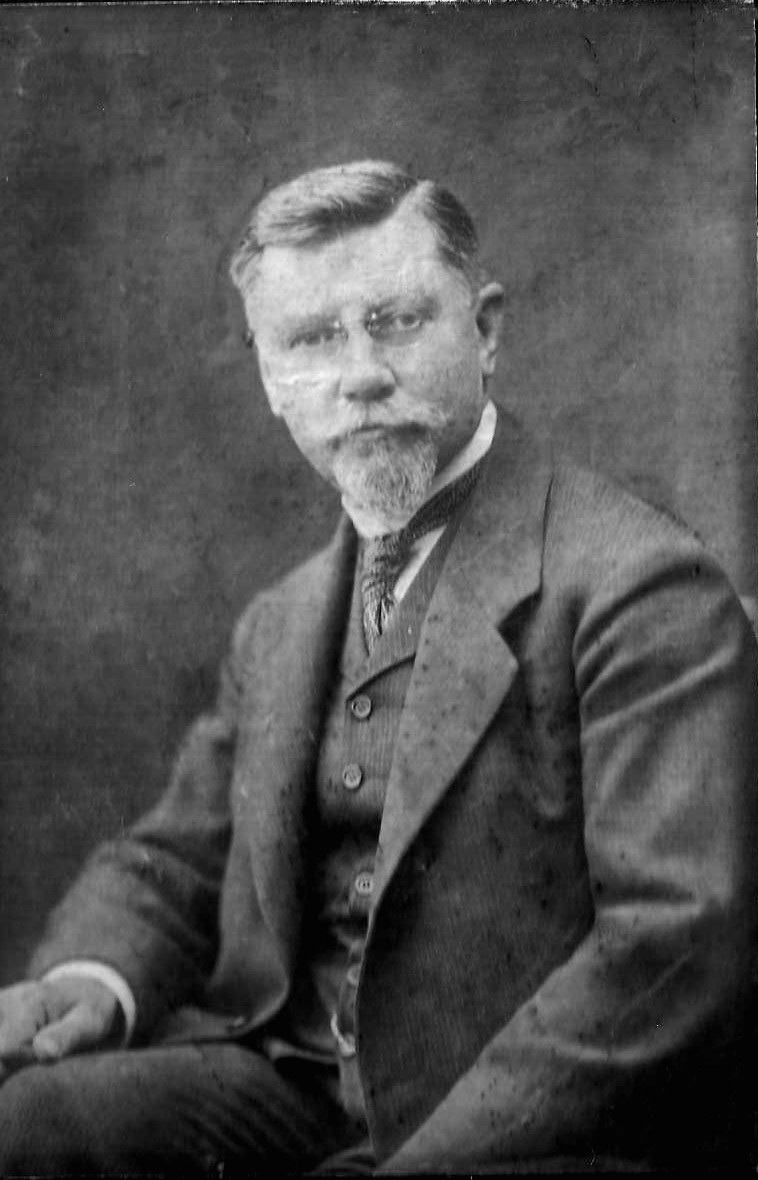
- Born: April 9, 1862; Berlin
- Died: April 11, 1924 (aged 62)

Karl Oenike (April 9, 1862 – April 11, 1924) was a German landscape painter. He participated in various scientific expeditions in South America during the years 1887–1891 as painter and photographer. He wrote detailed diaries and made drawings, sketches, watercolors, oil paintings and photos during these expeditions, which give a valuable perspective of remote regions and populations, and of the difficulties encountered by German explorers in the 1880s. Few artists in the exotic art genre have depicted better the "magic of the forest" in his paintings.

== Life and work ==
Karl Oenike was born in Berlin on April 9, 1862. He studied art in the Berlin University of the Arts from 1879 to 1886 under Prof. Eugen Bracht, who was a highly respected landscape painter of "oriental motives". Drawing he studied with Prof. Hans Meyer

In 1887 he was invited by Prof. Ludwig Brackebusch to participate in a geographical and geological expedition surveying the Andes mountains starting in the province of San Juan to the province of Salta in Argentina’s NW. He later undertook other expeditions on his own to Salta, Paraguay and Brazil.

During his stay in Buenos Aires, Argentina, he met Wilhelmine Fehling, whom he married in 1891 and with whom he moved back to Berlin. They had four daughters, Charlotte, Marie Henriette, Wilhelmine Gertrud and Luise Irmgard.

Upon his return to Berlin Karl Oenike pursued a career as landscape painter, mainly in northern Europe. He was commissioned to paint castles, sceneries, reproduce historic scenes, etc. and participated in several exhibitions. He was a very prolific artist, using various techniques like engraving, watercolor, oil painting, etc. His best known artwork is "Einzug der Pilger", an engraving showing the entry of pilgrims into the village of Bethlehem around 1894, which has been widely reproduced in diverse publications. But actually most of his work was landscape painting, where he depicted his "personal vision of nature".

But his years in the Southern region of South America "occupied a very important position, yes, a good part of his life work". He left various reports on his trips, some of which can be found in the library of the Society for Geography in Berlin and in the Ibero-Amerikanisches Institut in Berlin. And his drawings, engravings and photos appeared in various works about South America and most of them are in the Linden Museum in Stuttgart.

He died on April 11, 1924, at the age of 62.

== Expeditions ==
- 1888 – Geological Expedition in the Andean region of Argentina led by Prof. Ludwig Brackebusch covering the provinces of San Luis, San Juan, La Rioja, Catamarca, Jujuy and Salta.
- 1888 – Expedition to Salta by himself
- 1889 – Expedition to Paraguay where he met Prof.A.Jordan, an Austrian ethnographer, with whom he climbed the Cerro Tatuy in search of the Guayaki tribe, one of the last Stone Age groups in existence.
- 1891 – Expedition to Rio de Janeiro, Brazil

== Drawings in publications ==
- Ludwig Brackebusch – "Die Kordillerenpässe zwischen der argentinischen Republik und Chile" (The mountain crossings between Argentina and Chile), ed. Zeitschrift Gesellschat für Erdkunde, t.27, 1892
- Ludwig Brackebusch – "Das Bergmannsleben in der Argentinischen Republik" (The Life of Miners in Argentina), ed. Westermanns Monatshefte, T.75, March 1894, p. 749-771 includes 15 drawings by K.Oenike
- Karl Oenike – "Leben und Treiben auf den Steppen und in den Saladeros Südamerikas". Illustrierte Zeitung (Leipzig) Nr.2658 (1894): 623-627
- Karl Oenike – "Ein Ausflug in Paraguay". Vom Fels zum Meer 15/1 (1896): 122-129
- Karl Oenike – "Skizzen aus Argentinien" (Notes on Argentina); 14 p incl. 20 drawings, pub. Von Fels zum Meer (1896): 109-115
- Karl Oenike – "Skizzen aus Paraguay". Über Land und Meer Nr.87 Jhg 44/14 (1902). 227-229
- Karl Oenike – "Kakteen Landschaft in Argentinien". Illustrierte Welt 50/26 (1902): 609
- Dr.P.Ehrenreich – "Neue Mitteilungen ueber die Guayaki (Steinzeitmenschen) in Paraguay" (New reports on the Guayaki (Stone Age tribe) in Paraguay) in Globus Zeitschrift, T.LXXIII, Nr.5, p. 1-6, Ed. By F.Vieweg & Son, Braunschweig, Germany (1898) includes 1 drawing by K.Oenike
- Moritz Kronfeld – "Bilder-Atlas zur Pflanzengeographie" (Picture Atlas of Plants), Bibliographisches Institut, 1908, 192 pp, includes drawings by K.Oenike
- Dr. Herman Ten Kate – "Exotisme in de Kunst" (Exotism in Art), Elserevier’s Geillustreerd Maandschrift, Year XXIII, T. XLVI (July–December 1913), Amsterdam, the Netherlands
- Roberto Liebenthal and translations of Karl Oenike artichles by Regula Rohland and Beatriz Romero – "Johann Karl Oenike (1862–1924) Testimonios", p.89-145, Cuadernos del Archivo, Año VI.2, Nbr.11/12 (2022), Buenos Aires, Argentina
- Wilhelm Sievers – "Süd- und Mittelamerika" (3. Auflage), Bibliographisches Institut, Leipzig & Wien, 1914, 660 pp, includes drawings by K.Oenike pp. 231, 241, 373

== Paintings ==
There is no complete listing of his work, but the following are some paintings that are mentioned in auction house listings: The arrival of the Pilgrims (Einzug der Pilger); By the water’s edge; Summer lake with lilies and reeds; High Mountain grove; Botanical Gardens- Rio de Janeiro; Landscape with river and figure; French river landscape with large trees and woman walking; Palms in the jungle of Paraguay (Palmenlichtung im Urwald von Paraguay); Figures in Paraguayan landscape; Old oaks; Oven by the wood; Bavarian moor; San Bernardino-Paraguay; Landscape of Argentina, Big Tree and some men (Motiv aus Argentinien); Oberburg Manderscheid; Hain im Riesengebirge; William Tell; Bondgard; Am Waldsaum; Waldlichtung; Pappeln am Menkiner See; Bispinger, Feldweg auf einer Bergkuppe und Bauernhaus; Dorfschmiede by Menkin, Uckermark; Schloss Dyck; Brazilian Mountain Lake (Brasilianischer Bergsee); In the mountains of Cordoba in Argentina (In den Bergen von Cordoba in Argentinien);

== Exhibitions ==
This is only a partial listing.

- Südamerika. Bilder und Studien. Collectivausttelung bei Gurlitt. Berlin. Ausstellungskatalog Gurlitt (1891)
- 63. Ausstellung der Kgl. Akademie der Kuenste in Berlin (1892)
- Grosse Berliner Kunstausstellung, from 1893–1924 he regularly participated this annual Art Exhibition
- Kunstverein Bremen, Germany, 28. Grosse Gemalde Ausstellung (3.1 to 4.18.1892)
- Deutsche Kunstabteilung, Chicago World Exhibition (1893)
- Kunstverein Bremen, 29. Grosse Gemalde Ausstellung (March 1894)
- Kunstverein Bremen, 30. Grosse Gemalde Ausstellung (3.1 to 4.15.1896)
- Thuringer Ausstellungsverein Bildender Kunstler, Jena, Germany (May 1902)
- Kunstverein Wiesbaden, Germany, Ausstellung Internationaler Graphik des 19. Jahrhunderts (1912)
