= Jesse L. Brown =

United States Navy officer (1926–1950)

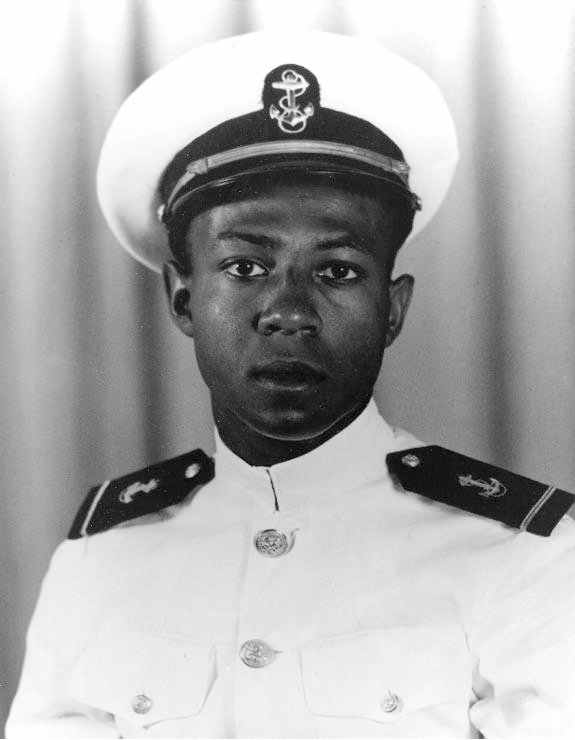
- Brown in 1948
- Born: Jesse LeRoy Brown; October 13, 1926; Hattiesburg, Mississippi, U.S.
- Died: December 4, 1950 (aged 24); Changjin County, South Hamgyong Province, North Korea
- Burial place: Changjin County, South Hamgyong Province, North Korea
- Military career
- Allegiance: United States
- Branch: United States Navy
- Service years: 1946–1950
- Rank: Ensign
- Service number: 504477
- Unit: Fighter Squadron 32
- Conflicts: Korean War; Second Phase Offensive; Battle of Chosin Reservoir (DOW)
- Awards: Distinguished Flying Cross; Purple Heart

Jesse LeRoy Brown (October 13, 1926 – December 4, 1950) was a United States Navy officer. He was the first African-American aviator to complete the United States Navy's basic flight training program (though not the first African-American Navy aviator), the first African-American naval officer killed in the Korean War, and a recipient of the Distinguished Flying Cross.

Born in Hattiesburg, Mississippi, to an impoverished family, Brown was avidly interested in aircraft from a young age. He graduated as salutatorian of his high school, notwithstanding its racial segregation, and later earned a degree from Ohio State University. Brown enlisted in the U.S. Navy in 1946, becoming a midshipman. Brown earned his pilot wings on October 21, 1948, amid a flurry of press coverage. In January 1949 he was assigned to Fighter Squadron 32 (VF-32) aboard the aircraft carrier USS Leyte based at Naval Air Station Quonset Point.

At the outset of the Korean War, Leyte was ordered to the Korean Peninsula, arriving in October 1950. VF-32 flew F4U-4 Corsair fighters in support of United Nations forces. Brown, an ensign, had already flown 20 combat missions when his Corsair came under fire and crashed on a remote mountaintop on December 4, 1950, while supporting ground troops at the Battle of Chosin Reservoir. Brown died of his wounds despite the efforts of his wingman, Thomas J. Hudner Jr., who intentionally crashed his own aircraft nearby in a rescue attempt, for which he was awarded the Medal of Honor.

Brown's life in the segregated and desegregated U.S. military has been memorialized in books and film, including the 2022 film Devotion. The frigate USS Jesse L. Brown (FF-1089) was named in his honor.

== Early life and education ==
Brown was born on October 13, 1926, in Hattiesburg, Mississippi. He was one of six children born to Julia Lindsey Brown, a schoolteacher, and John Brown, a grocery warehouse worker. He had four brothers, Marvin, William, Fletcher, and Lura, as well as an older sister known as Johnny. Brown's ancestry was African American, Chickasaw, and Choctaw. The family lived in a house without central heating or indoor plumbing so they relied on a fireplace for warmth. As a child, Jesse's brother William fell into this fireplace and was severely burned.

At the beginning of the Great Depression, John Brown lost his job and relocated the family to Palmer's Crossing, 10 miles (16 km) from Hattiesburg, where he worked at a turpentine factory until he was laid off in 1938. John Brown moved the family to Lux, Mississippi, where he worked as a sharecropper on a farm. During this time, Jesse Brown shared a bed with his brothers (as was common among many families) and attended a one-room school 3 miles (4.8 km) away. His parents were very strict about school attendance and homework, and Jesse Brown walked to school every day. The Browns also were committed Baptists and Jesse, William, and Julia Brown sang in the church choir. In his spare time, Brown also worked in the fields of the farm harvesting corn and cotton.

When Brown was six years old, his father took him to an air show. Brown gained an intense interest in flying from this experience, and afterward, was attracted to a dirt airfield near his home, which he visited frequently in spite of being chased away by a local mechanic.

At the age of thirteen, Brown took a job as a paperboy for the Pittsburgh Courier, a Black press paper, and developed a desire to pilot while reading in the newspaper about African-American aviators of the time including C. Alfred Anderson, Eugine Jacques Bullard, and Bessie Coleman. He also became an avid reader of Popular Aviation and the Chicago Defender, which he later said heavily influenced his desire to fly naval aircraft. In his childhood he was described as "serious, witty, unassuming, and very intelligent." In 1937, he wrote a letter to U.S. President Franklin D. Roosevelt in which he complained of the injustice of African-American pilots being kept out of the U.S. Army Air Corps, to which the White House responded with a letter saying that it appreciated the viewpoint.

Because the schools closer to his family were of lower quality, in 1939, Brown lived with his aunt and attended the segregated Eureka High School in Hattiesburg. He was a member of the basketball, football, and track and field teams and he was an excellent student, graduating as the salutatorian in 1944. During this time, Brown met his future wife, Daisy Pearl Nix.

Following graduation, Brown sought to enroll in a college outside of the South. His principal, Nathaniel Burger, advised he attend an all-Black college, as his brother Marvin Brown had done. But he enrolled at Ohio State University as his childhood role model, Jesse Owens, had done. Burger told Brown that only seven African Americans had graduated from the university that year, but Brown was determined to enroll, believing that he could compete well with white students.

Brown took several side jobs to save money for college, including waiting tables at the Holmes Club, a saloon for white U.S. Army soldiers. In this job, Brown was frequently the target of racist vitriol and abuse, but he persevered, earning US$600 (equivalent to $11,000 in 2025) to pay for college. In the autumn of 1944, Brown left Mississippi on a segregated train for Columbus, Ohio, where he started at Ohio State.

Brown moved into an on-campus boarding house at 61 East Eleventh Avenue in the primarily Black neighborhood of the University District in Columbus. He majored in architectural engineering. Brown attempted several times to apply to the school's aviation program, but was denied because of his race. Brown joined the track and field team as well as the wrestling team, but soon dropped both for financial reasons. He took a job as a janitor at a local Lazarus department store and was hired by the Pennsylvania Railroad to load boxcars from 15:30 to midnight each day. In spite of this, he maintained top grades in his classes.

Although facing difficulties with academics and the institutional segregation in the city, Brown found that most of his fellow students were friendly toward him. Brown rarely returned to Mississippi during the school year, but in the summers he worked at Barnes Cleaners (dry cleaner) owned by Milton L Barnes Sr. in Hattiesburg to help pay for his classes.

During his second year in college, Brown learned of the V-5 Aviation Cadet Training Program being conducted by the U.S. Navy to commission naval aviation pilots. This program operated at 52 colleges, none of which was a historically Black college, so only students such as Brown, who attended integrated colleges, were eligible. In spite of resistance from recruiters, Brown passed the entrance exams.

Brown enlisted in the U.S. Naval Reserve on July 8, 1946 and was admitted to the aviation program, becoming a Seaman Apprentice in the U.S. Navy and a member of the school's Naval Reserve Officer Training Corps (NROTC) program. A $50 monthly stipend (equivalent to $830 in 2025) allowed him to quit his jobs and concentrate on his studies; he completed his architectural engineering degree in 1947. At this time, the NROTC was the normal route to a regular Naval commission, but only 14 of the more than 5,600 NROTC students in 1947 were Black.

== Career ==
On March 15, 1947, Brown reported to Naval Air Station Glenview in Glenview, Illinois, for Student Naval Aviator training. There, his enlistment ended April 15 and Brown was appointed to the rank of midshipman, becoming the only African American in the program. Although he anticipated antagonism, he found the other cadets were generally friendly and welcoming. He found many of the Black cooks and janitors hostile to him, however, possibly due to jealousy. Brown got his first flight time aboard a Stearman N2S trainer aircraft.

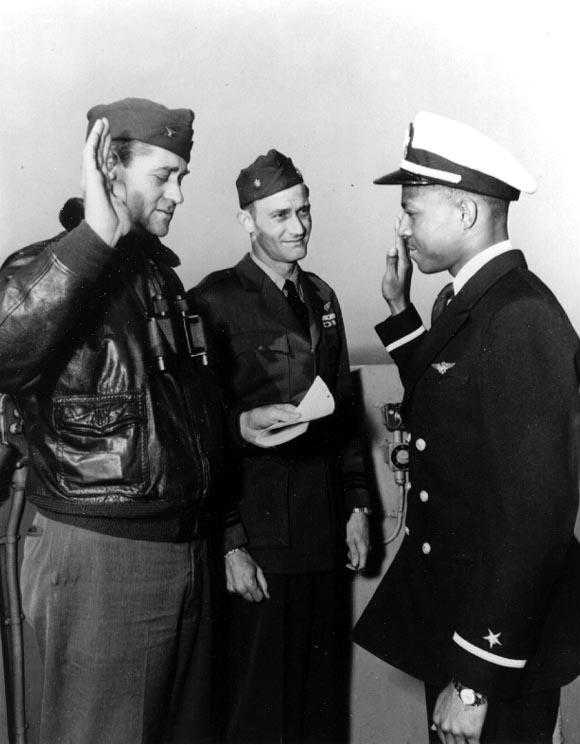
Brown is commissioned aboard USS Leyte in 1949

In spite of the rigors of the initial training, Brown was encouraged by instructors and completed the first phase of training, transferring to Naval Air Station Ottumwa in Ottumwa, Iowa, for the next phase. The Ottumwa training involved intense physical fitness and technical training, which Brown completed. Thereafter, he was moved to Naval Air Station Pensacola in Pensacola, Florida, to train in aircraft.

In Pensacola, Brown and Nix married in secret, as naval cadets were not allowed to marry until their training was complete, under threat of immediate dismissal. Nix took a room in Pensacola, and the two visited one another on weekends. In spite of overt racism from at least one instructor and several classmates at this posting, Brown completed the rigorous training in August 1947.

By June 1948, Brown had begun training for carrier-based aircraft and hoped to fly either the F4U Corsair or F6F Hellcat, both of which were fighters. He trained in carrier takeoffs and landings aboard the light carrier USS Wright, after which he was sent to Naval Air Station Jacksonville, Florida, for final flight qualifications. On October 21, 1948, he completed his training and was awarded his Naval Aviator Badge and designation as a Naval Aviator. This accomplishment was widely publicized, and Brown became known nationally. The Associated Press profiled him and his photograph appeared in Life magazine. Author Theodore Taylor later wrote that through Brown's efforts to become a pilot, he had broken the "color barrier" which had been longstanding at preventing Black people in Naval Aviation.

Brown was commissioned as an ensign in the U.S. Navy on April 26, 1949. He was assigned to Naval Air Station Quonset Point at Quonset Point, Rhode Island, as a part of the U.S. Atlantic Fleet. Brown reported that incidents of racism and discrimination, which had been harsh late in his training, were substantially relieved once he became an officer. Following his commissioning, Brown was assigned to temporary duty at Naval Air Station Norfolk in Norfolk, Virginia. His daughter, Pamela Elise Brown, was born in December. In January 1949, Brown was assigned to Fighter Squadron 32 aboard USS Leyte. Over the next 18 months, the unit conducted numerous training exercises along the East Coast, many of them taking place at Quonset Point. Brown reported here his superiors treated him fairly and held others to equal standards. The unit trained rigorously in aircraft maneuvers.

By the outbreak of the Korean War, he had gained a reputation among the others in the squadron as an experienced pilot and a capable section leader. He was well-liked among other pilots and the Black stewards and support staff of the carrier. Brown did not socialize much with the other pilots, however, and was known to spend as much time as possible visiting his wife. He was able to reveal his marriage following his commissioning.

=== Korean War ===
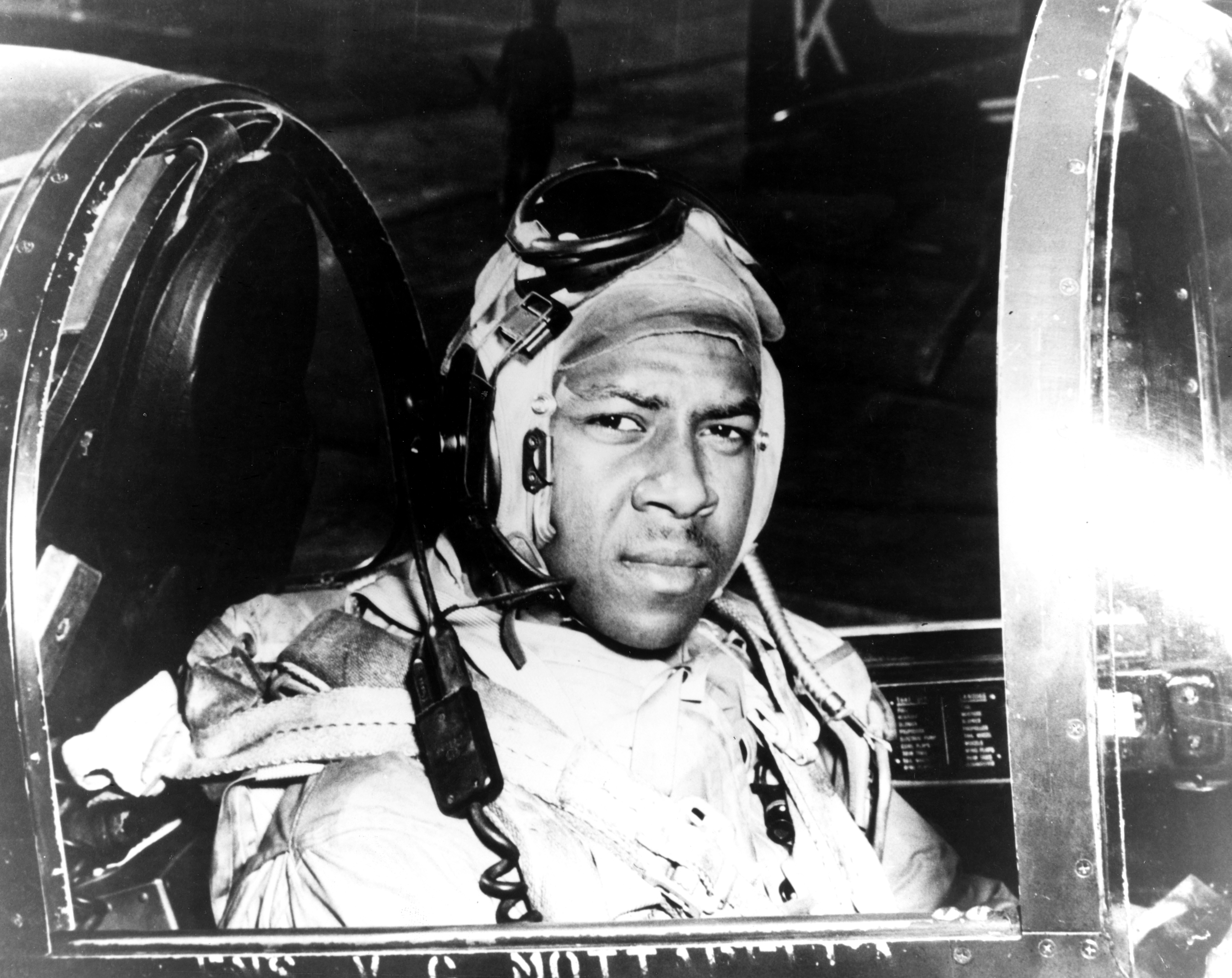
Brown in the cockpit of a Grumman F8F 'Bearcat' fighter (circa 1949), prior to deploying to Korea in late 1950

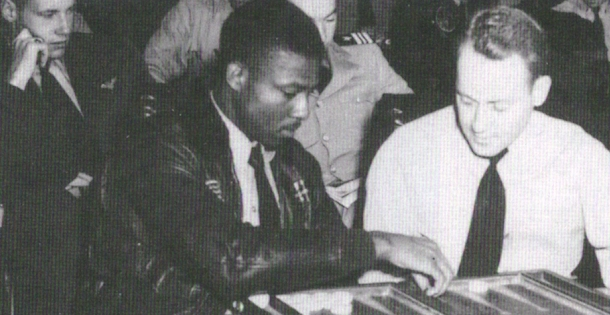
Brown in the ready room of the aircraft carrier USS Leyte.

On the night of June 25, 1950, ten North Korean and Korean ethnic Chinese infantry divisions launched a full-scale invasion of the nation's neighbor to the south, the Republic of Korea. The force of 89,000 men moved in six columns, catching the Republic of Korea Army by surprise, resulting in a rout. The smaller South Korean army suffered from widespread lack of organization and equipment, and was unprepared for war. The numerically superior North Korean forces destroyed isolated resistance from the 38,000 South Korean soldiers on the front before it began moving steadily south. Most of South Korea's forces retreated in the face of the invasion. The North Koreans were well on their way to South Korea's capital of Seoul within hours, forcing the government and its shattered army to retreat farther south.

To prevent South Korea's collapse, the United Nations Security Council voted to send military forces. The United States Seventh Fleet dispatched Task Force 77, led by the fleet carrier USS Valley Forge; the British Far East Fleet dispatched several ships, including HMS Triumph, to provide air and naval support. Although the navies blockaded North Korea and launched aircraft to delay the North Korean forces, these efforts alone did not stop the North Korean Army juggernaut on its southern advance. U.S. President Harry S. Truman ordered ground troops into the country to supplement the air support. All U.S. Navy units, including Leyte, were placed on alert. At the time, the ship was in the Mediterranean Sea and Brown did not expect to be deployed to Korea, but on August 8 a relief carrier arrived in the area and Leyte was ordered to Korea. Commanders felt the pilots on the carrier were better trained, and hence needed in the theater. The ship sailed from the Strait of Gibraltar across the Atlantic Ocean and to Quonset, then through the Panama Canal and to San Diego, California, Hawaii, and Japan before arriving in Korea around October 8.

The ship joined Task Force 77 off the northeast coast of the Korean Peninsula, part of a fleet of 17 ships from the Seventh Fleet, including the aircraft carrier USS Philippine Sea, battleship USS Missouri and cruiser USS Juneau. Brown flew 20 missions in-country. These missions included attacks on communication lines, troop concentrations, and military installations around Wonsan, Chongpu, Songjim, and Senanju.

Following the entrance of the People's Republic of China into the war in October 1950, Brown and his squadron were dispatched to the Chosin Reservoir, where an intense campaign was being fought between X Corps (United States) and the People's Volunteer Army's 9th Army. Approximately 100,000 Chinese troops had surrounded 15,000 U.S. troops, and Brown and other pilots on Leyte flew dozens of close air support missions every day to prevent the Chinese from overrunning the U.S. troops.

== Death ==
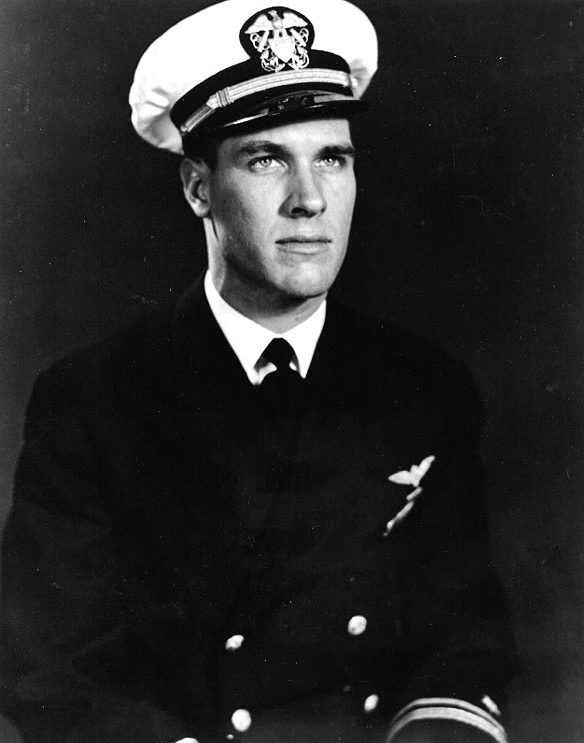
Thomas J. Hudner Jr., Brown's wingman, who was awarded the Medal of Honor for attempting to save him

On December 4, 1950, Brown was part of a six-aircraft flight supporting U.S. Marine Corps ground troops trapped by Chinese forces. At 13:38 KST, Brown took off from Leyte with squadron executive officer Lieutenant Commander Dick Cevoli, Lieutenant George Hudson, Lieutenant Junior Grade Bill Koenig, Ensign Ralph E. McQueen, and Lieutenant Junior Grade Thomas J. Hudner Jr., who was Brown's wingman. During this flight, Brown had the call sign "Iroquois 13". The flight traveled 100 miles (160 km) to the Chosin Reservoir, flying 35 to 40 minutes in very harsh wintery conditions to the vicinity of the villages of Yudam-ni and Hagaru-ri. The flight began searching for targets along the west side of the reservoir, decreasing their altitude to 700 feet (210 m). The mission was a three-hour search and destroy flight as well as an attempt to probe Chinese troop strength in the area.

Although the flight spotted no Chinese, at 14:40 Koenig radioed that Brown appeared to be trailing fuel. The damage had likely come by small arms fire from Chinese infantry, who were known to hide in the snow and to ambush passing aircraft by firing in unison. At least one bullet had ruptured a fuel line. Brown, losing fuel pressure and increasingly unable to control the aircraft, dropped his external fuel tanks and rockets and attempted to land the craft in a snow-covered clearing on the side of a mountain. Brown crashed into a bowl-shaped valley at approximately 40°36′N 127°06′E. The aircraft broke up violently upon impact and was destroyed. In the crash, Brown's leg was pinned beneath the fuselage of the aircraft, and he stripped off his helmet and gloves in an attempt to free himself, before waving to the other pilots, who were circling close overhead. The other pilots had thought he had died in the crash. Brown had crash-landed near Somong-ni, 15 miles (24 km) behind Chinese lines in 15 °F (−9 °C) weather, and the other pilots began a Mayday radio to any heavy transport aircraft in the area as they scanned the mountain for any sign of Chinese ground forces who might threaten Brown. They received a signal that a rescue helicopter would come as soon as possible, but Brown's aircraft was smoking and a fire had started near its internal fuel tanks.

Before it became clear Brown was seriously injured, Hudner attempted in vain to rescue Brown by radioing him instructions for escaping his damaged aircraft. Hudner then intentionally crash-landed his aircraft, ran to Brown's side and attempted to wrestle him free from the wreck. While Brown's condition worsened by the minute, Hudner attempted in vain to put out the aircraft fire using snow and to pull Brown from the aircraft. In great pain, Brown began slipping in and out of consciousness. A rescue helicopter arrived around 15:00; its pilot, Lieutenant Charles Ward, and Hudner were unable to put out the engine fire with a fire extinguisher, and tried unsuccessfully to free Brown with an axe for 45 minutes. They even considered, at Brown's request, amputating his trapped leg. Brown lost consciousness shortly thereafter. His last known words to Hudner were, "Tell Daisy I love her." The helicopter, which was unable to operate in the darkness, was forced to return to base at nightfall with Hudner, leaving Brown behind. Brown is believed to have died shortly thereafter of his injuries and exposure to the extreme cold. No Chinese forces threatened the site, likely owing to the heavy air presence of Brown and Hudner's unit.

Hudner begged superiors to allow him to return to the wreck to help extract Brown, but he was not allowed, as other officers feared an ambush of the vulnerable helicopters resulting in casualties. To prevent the body and the aircraft from falling into Chinese or North Korean hands, the U.S. Navy bombed the aircraft with napalm two days later, with pilots reportedly reciting the Lord's Prayer over the radio as they watched Brown's body be consumed by flames. The pilots observed that Brown's body was not stuck in the aircraft, but his clothes were gone. The remains of both Brown and the aircraft were never recovered. Brown was the first African-American U.S. Navy officer killed in the war.

== Legacy ==
"He died in the wreckage of his airplane with courage and unfathomable dignity. He willingly gave his life to tear down barriers to freedom of others."

— Hudner, speaking of Brown 17 February 1973, at the commissioning of the USS Jesse L. Brown

For his actions in Korea leading up to his death, Brown was awarded the Distinguished Flying Cross, the Purple Heart Medal, and the Air Medal. For the failed rescue attempt, Hudner received the Medal of Honor, the highest valor award presented by the U.S. military.

Brown's shipmates memorialized him in a shipwide newspaper as "a Christian soldier, a gentleman, a shipmate, and friend ... His courage and faith ... shone like a beacon for all to see." As word of his death spread, Brown inspired numerous other African Americans to become pilots, notably Seaman Apprentice Frank E. Petersen. Petersen would become the first African-American Marine Corps aviator and the first African-American Marine Corps general, graduating from the Naval Aviation Training Program in 1952 and retiring from the military after 38 years in 1988 with the rank of lieutenant general.

On February 17, 1973, the Navy commissioned the Knox-class frigate USS Jesse L. Brown (FF-1089), the third U.S. ship named in honor of an African American. Present at the commissioning ceremony in Boston, Massachusetts, were Daisy Brown Thorne (who had remarried), Pamela Brown, and Hudner, who gave a dedication. The ship was decommissioned on July 27, 1994, and renamed Damiyat after being commissioned with the Egyptian Navy.

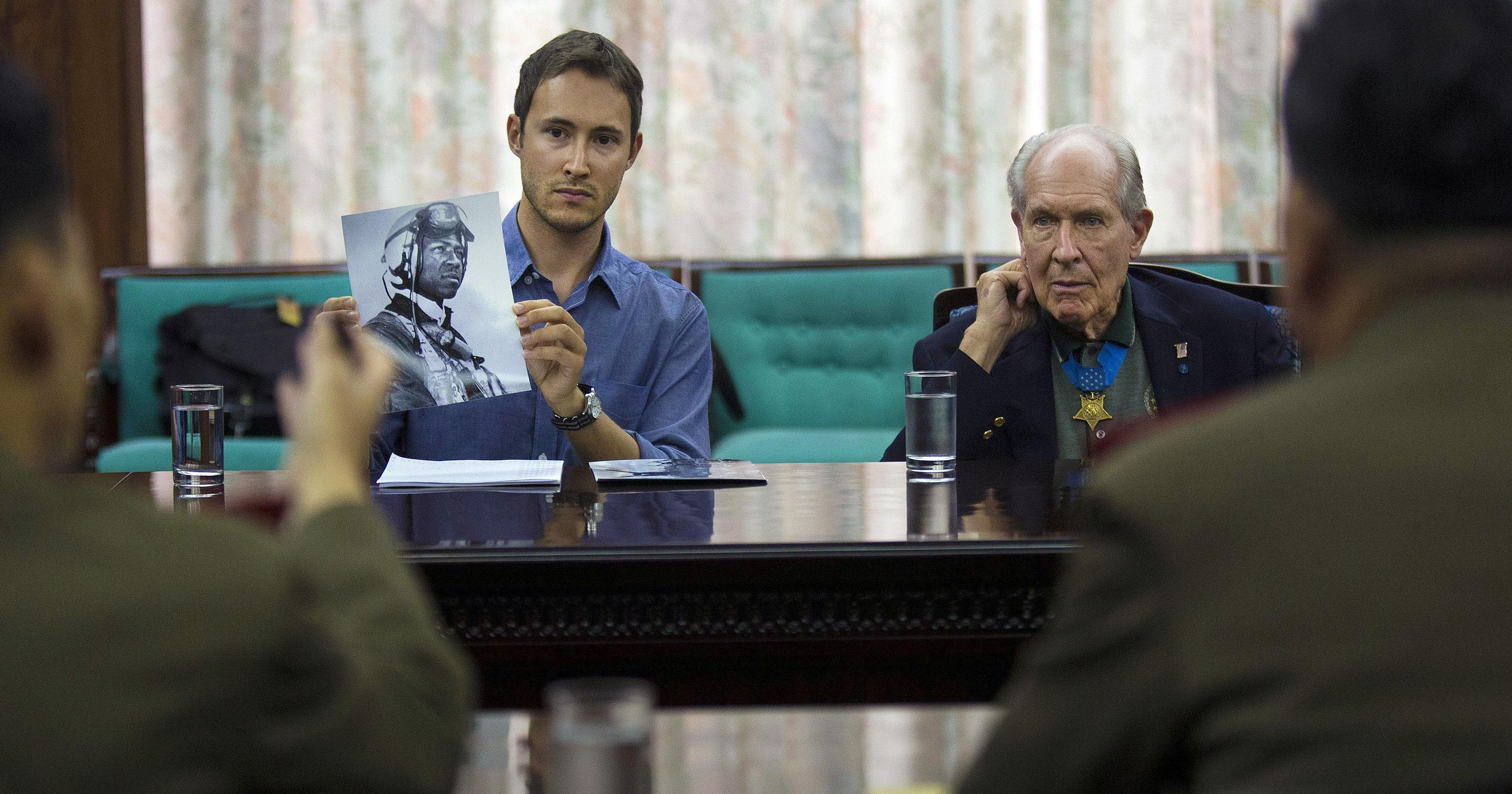
Author Adam Makos and Tom Hudner negotiate with North Korean officials for the return of Brown's remains

In July 2013, Hudner visited Pyongyang in an attempt to recover Brown's remains from the crash site. He was told by North Korean authorities to return in September when the weather would be more predictable.

While Brown is often cited as the first African-American Naval Aviator, Lieutenant (junior grade) Oscar W. Holmes preceded him, earning the designation of Naval Aviator in 1943, because the Navy did not initially realize he was an African American.

== Biographies ==
In 1998, Theodore Taylor wrote a biography titled Flight of Jesse Leroy Brown, interviewing Brown's acquaintances and with reference to his personal letters. In 2011 a traveling exhibit, "A Pilot Lights the Way" was featured in the 100th Anniversary of Naval Aviation exhibit at the National Museum of Naval Aviation, the curator was author and poet, Valada Flewellyn. The "A Pilot Light the Way" exhibit opened at the University of Central Florida (UCF) and traveled to Hattiesburg, Mississippi, and other locations. In 2015, Brown was the subject of the biography Devotion: An Epic Story of Heroism, Friendship, and Sacrifice, by Adam Makos.

Brown is portrayed in the 2022 film Devotion by Jonathan Majors.

== Awards and decorations ==
Brown's military decorations and awards included the following: (Note: While he did not enlist until 10 months after the surrender of Japan, Brown was also technically eligible for the World War II Victory Medal (United States) since it was awarded until December 31, 1946.)

Naval Aviator Badge
Distinguished Flying Cross	Purple Heart	Air Medal
Combat Action Ribbon	National Defense Service Medal	Korean Service Medal
Korean Presidential Unit Citation	United Nations Korea Medal	Korean War Service Medal (Note: In 2000 this award was made retroactive to all U.S. military personnel who served in the Korean War. See: US Navy, Korean Service Medal.)

His Distinguished Flying Cross citation reads:

The President of the United States of America takes pride in presenting the Distinguished Flying Cross (Posthumously) to Ensign Jesse Leroy Brown (NSN: 0-504477), United States Navy, for heroism in aerial flight as Pilot of a fighter plane in Fighter Squadron Thirty-Two (VF-32), attached to the USS Leyte (CV-32), in hostile attacks on hostile North Korean forces. Participating in 20 strikes on enemy military installations, lines of communication, transportation facilities, and enemy troop concentrations in the face of grave hazard, at the Chosin Reservoir, Takshon, Manp Jin, Linchong, Sinuiju, Kasan, Wonsan, Chonjin, Kilchu, and Sinanju during the period October 12 to December 4, 1950. With courageous efficiency and utter disregard for his own personal safety, Ensign Brown, while in support of friendly troops in the Chosin Reservoir area, pressed home numerous attacks destroying an enemy troop concentration moving to attack our troops. So aggressive were these attacks, in the face of enemy anti-aircraft fire, that they finally resulted in the destruction of Ensign Brown's plane by anti-aircraft fire. His gallant devotion to duty was in keeping with the highest traditions of the United States Naval Service.

== In film and literature ==
- Film: Devotion (2022)
- Book: Devotion: An Epic Story of Heroism, Friendship, and Sacrifice (2015)

== See also ==
- List of African-American firsts
