= Oscar Holmes =

American Navy aviator, air traffic controller (1916–2001)

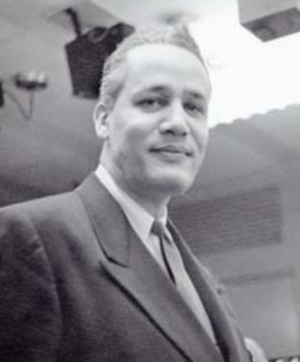
- Born: Oscar Wayman Holmes; 31 January 1916; Dunbar, West Virginia, US
- Died: 5 November 2001 (aged 85); Mitchellville, Maryland, US
- Alma mater: West Virginia State College; Ohio State University; Brooklyn Law School
- Military career
- Allegiance: United States
- Branch: United States Navy
- Service years: 1942–1946
- Conflicts: World War II

Oscar Wayman Holmes (31 January 1916 – 5 November 2001) was an American Naval Aviator in World War II and civilian flight controller, the first African-American in each position.

== Biography ==
Holmes graduated from Garnet High School in Charleston, West Virginia, in 1932, West Virginia State College in 1936 with a B.S. and Ohio State University the following year with a master's degree in chemistry. He taught chemistry (a subject he did not like) for three years at Claflin College, a historically black school in Orangeburg, South Carolina. In 1940, he went to work for the Erie Lighting Company in Erie, Pennsylvania, as a chemical analyst.

Wanting to become a pilot, he won a scholarship and enrolled in the US government's Civilian Pilot Training Program. He obtained his private pilot's license by 1941.

Later that year, he applied to become an air traffic controller for the Civil Aeronautics Administration, a position that required a pilot's license and a college degree. The application and his acceptance were both handled by telegram. After training, he was assigned to the New York traffic control center, becoming the first African-American air traffic controller. He was very light skinned, and his superiors were unaware of his African-American heritage until he had to fill out a questionnaire. He did well, and Robert L. Johnston, the chief controller at the center, told Holmes he had recommended him for promotion. However, it never came. Holmes thought for 15 years that Johnston had lied to him, but in 1957 learned that higher ups had rejected him.

In August 1942, with the United States now in World War II, Holmes read in The New York Times that the United States Navy was offering reserve commissions to those with a pilot's license and 125 hours of flying time to become flight instructors or deliver aircraft. Despite admitting that he only had 90 hours in the air, he was accepted. He was sworn in on 28 September, with his commission dated 14 September. The Navy was, at that time, still segregated – African Americans were only accepted as steward's mates, not as officers – but once again the authorities assumed he was white. Holmes later admitted he knew about the Navy's policy, "but they didn't ask me and I didn't tell them". By the time his superiors discovered their mistake, it would have been embarrassing to admit it, so they did nothing. He continued to work, eat and sleep alongside white officers, unlike other African-American servicemen, who were segregated. He successfully completed flight instructor training at Colgate University, Naval Air Station Corpus Christi, Naval Air Station Glenview and Naval Air Station New Orleans, and was made a Naval Aviator on 30 June 1943. However, while his classmates became flight instructors, he was given a desk job in Manhattan, interviewing prospective cadets.

In the fall of 1943, the Navy announced that all ensigns with a date of rank of 1 October or earlier would be promoted to lieutenant (j.g.). Holmes, however, had to pass a flight check before being promoted.

Bored, he requested a transfer to become a flight instructor or aircraft delivery pilot. In April 1944, he was transferred to Naval Air Station Dallas, where he delivered T-6 Texan trainer aircraft. In June, he was assigned to Air Ferry Squadron 3 on Mare Island, California, where he flew different types of aircraft from factories to bases in the United States.

After the end of the war, he returned to civilian life in 1946. He returned to work as a traffic controller at the New York center. He also attended Brooklyn Law School part-time and earned two degrees: an LL.B. in 1954 and an LL.M. in 1955. He passed the New York State bar and initially opened a part-time practice, but went on to work at the Federal Aviation Administration, the successor to the Civil Aeronautics Administration, and remained there until his retirement in 1973.

Oscar Wayman Holmes died in Mitchellville, Maryland, on 5 November 2001. He was married to Augusta Thomas Holmes for 53 years and had several children.

== See also ==
- Jesse L. Brown (1926–1950), the second African-American Navy aviator and the first African American in the United States Navy to be trained as an aviator and serve in combat
