= USS Jesse L. Brown =

Former Knox-class frigate of the United States Navy

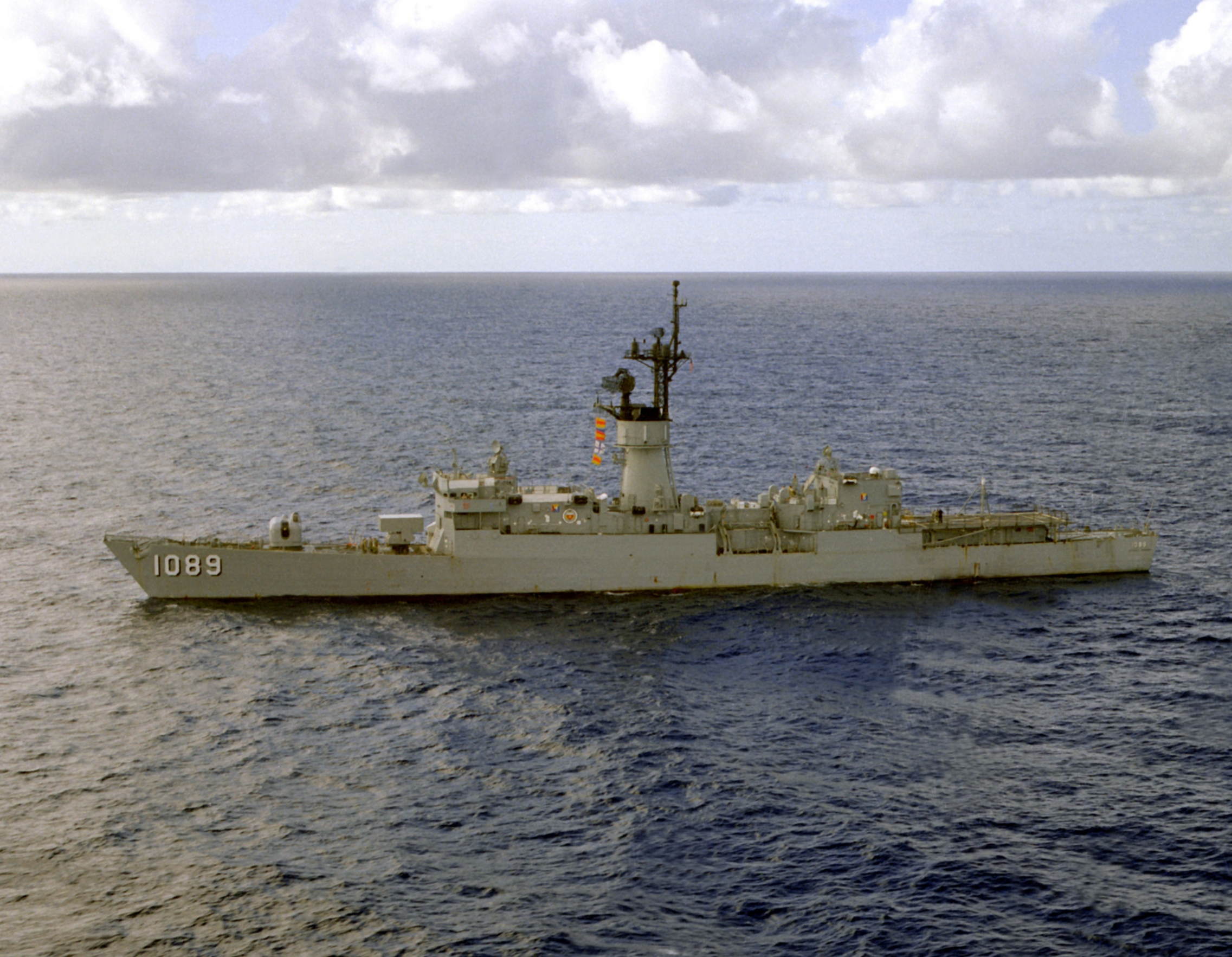
- USS Jesse L. Brown (FF-1089) sailing through Cuban waters in 1979.

History

United States
- Name: USS Jesse L. Brown
- Namesake: Jesse L. Brown
- Ordered: 25 August 1966
- Builder: Avondale Shipyard, Westwego, Louisiana
- Yard number: 1157
- Laid down: 8 April 1971
- Launched: 18 March 1972
- Sponsored by: Mrs. Gilbert W. Thorne
- Acquired: 8 December 1972
- Commissioned: 17 February 1973
- Decommissioned: 27 July 1994
- Stricken: 11 January 1995
- Identification: DE-1089 (1973–1975), FF-1089 (1975–1992), FFT-1089 (1992–1994)
- Motto: Versatility Victory Valor
- Fate: transferred to Egypt, 27 July 1994
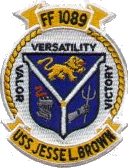
- Badge

Egypt
- Name: Damiyat
- Leased: 27 July 1994
- Purchased: 25 March 1998
- Identification: F961
- Status: in active service, as of 2018

General characteristics
- Class & type: Knox-class frigate
- Displacement: 3,201 tons (4,182 tons full load)
- Length: 438 ft (134 m)
- Beam: 46 ft 9 in (14.25 m)
- Draft: 24 ft 9 in (7.54 m)
- Installed power: 2 × CE 1200psi boilers; 1 shaft, 35,000 shp (26,000 kW)
- Propulsion: 1 Westinghouse geared turbine
- Speed: 28 1/2 kn (52.8 km/h; 32.8 mph) in service
- Boats & landing craft carried: 26 ft (7.9 m) Motor Whale Boat and Captain's Gig in port and starboard powered davits mounted amidships
- Complement: 18 officers, 267 enlisted
- Sensors & processing systems: AN/SPS-40C Air Search Radar; Originally AN/SPS-10F Surface Search Radar, later AN/SPS-67 Surface Search Radar; AN/SQS-26 Sonar; AN/SQR-18 towed array sonar system; Mk68 Gun Fire Control System
- Electronic warfare & decoys: Originally equipped with AN/SLQ-26 Electronic Warfare System consisting of AN/WLR-1C (Mod) with AN/ULQ-6C. Later removed and replaced by AN/SLQ-32 Electronic Warfare Suite
- Armament: one Mk-16 8-cell missile launcher for ASROC and Harpoon missiles; One Mk-42 5 in (130 mm)/54 caliber gun; Mark 46 torpedoes from four single tube launchers; One Phalanx CIWS
- Aircraft carried: one SH-2 Seasprite (LAMPS I) helicopter
- Aviation facilities: Retracting hangar forward of flight deck. Flight deck originally designed for the canceled DASH robotic ASW helicopter. Expanded and modified to support LAMPS program

USS Jesse L. Brown (DE/FF/FFT-1089) was a Knox-class frigate of the United States Navy. She was named for Jesse L. Brown, the first African-American aviator to complete the United States Navy's basic flight training program. The ship was eventually decommissioned and sold to the Egyptian Navy and was renamed Damiyat (F961). The name is also transliterated as Damyat and Damietta by some sources.

== History ==
Jesse L. Brown, a 3963-ton Knox-class escort ship built at Westwego, Louisiana, was commissioned in February 1973. In July 1975, she was reclassified as a frigate and designated FF-1089. Her career was spent with the Atlantic Fleet, and included several deployments to the Mediterranean Sea, the Persian Gulf and northern European waters. Jesse L. Brown also participated in two joint operations with Latin American Navies, UNITAS XX in 1979 and UNITAS XXX a decade later.

Jesse L. Brown was operating off the Guantanamo Bay area during January 1979 when USS Farragut mistakenly fired upon a Soviet oceangoing tug and Foxtrot-class submarine being given to the Cuban Navy. Farragut mistook the radar return for the US Navy fleet tug and towed target. During the next approximate 48 hours, Jesse L. Brown and the other ships maintained General Quarters while a state of near war existed, which included constant threat of attack by Cuban missile patrol boats and medium bombers.

Jesse L. Brown (in an episode foreshadowing her later service) was credited with a drug bust as a result of the rescue of an approximate 40 feet (12 m) sailboat in Casco Bay, Maine, while undergoing post yard refit sea trials from Bath Iron Works. The ship bears the marks of this operation to this day with visible dents in her hull from the strikes from the large sailboat while transferring the seasick crew in heavy sea conditions. The sailboat crew was later transferred to a former Navy ATF Coast Guard cutter out of Portland, Maine, after a failed towing attempt of the sailboat.

Jesse L. Brown's motto was "Versatility, Victory, Valor!". In one episode during the Iranian Hostage Crisis, the ship recovered an SH-3 Sea King that couldn't refuel in flight and didn't have enough fuel to return to its carrier. Jesse L. Brown's commanding officer ordered ship into the wind and recovered the Sea King onto the limited space flight deck, even though it was not rated for helicopters the size of the Sea King. The helicopter landed with her tail wheel in the safety nets and less than 18 inches (46 cm) of clearance between her rotors and the collapsed helicopter hangar. Quick repairs by both the helicopter's and ship's crew remedied the helicopter's fuel problem, and it was able to lift off and properly refuel airborne.

Jesse L. Brown and her crew were the first ship to escort three Pegasus-class patrol hydrofoils from Roosevelt Roads, Puerto Rico, to Key West, Florida, by using her helicopter refueling system as an underway replenishment refueling rig to refuel the three hydrofoils underway.

Jesse L. Brown served as the U.S. liaison and on-scene commander for rescue attempts and subsequent body recovery for a diving bell from the Phillips Petroleum oil-exploration ship MV Woodeco 5 off the Ivory Coast in October 1979.

During the later 1980s and early 1990s, she engaged in counter-narcotics operations in the Caribbean area.

Jesse L. Brown was transferred to the Naval Reserve in January 1992, and was redesignated FFT-1089. She was actively involved in training reservists while participating in operations in the western Atlantic and the Gulf of Mexico area. In 1993, she transited the Panama Canal and paid a visit to Ecuador. Jesse L. Brown was decommissioned on 27 July 1994 and leased to the Egyptian Navy the same day. Named Damiyat (F961) in Egyptian service (but also transliterated as Damyat or Damietta in some sources), she was purchased outright by the Egyptians on 25 March 1998. As of 2010, Damiyat remained active with the Egyptian Navy as seen making a sortie out of the harbour at Alexandria by cruise ship passengers.

== Awards and decorations ==

1st Row	Joint Meritorious Unit Award (with two bronze oak leaf clusters)		Navy Unit Commendation (with one bronze service star)
2nd Row	Navy Meritorious Unit Commendation	Navy "E" Ribbon (3)	Navy Expeditionary Medal (with one bronze service star)
3rd Row	National Defense Service Medal (with one bronze service star)	Sea Service Deployment Ribbon	Coast Guard Special Operations Service Ribbon
