= Rita Moss =

American jazz musician

Rita Moss (born Loreta L. Waynesboro; July 4, 1918 – July 16, 2015) was an American jazz and ballad singer, notable for her four-octave vocal range. Although she took piano lessons as a child, she was a mostly self-taught multi-instrumentalist who could play piano, organ and drums. She was born in Cabin Creek, Kanawha, West Virginia, grew up in Charleston, WV, and, sometime in the mid-to-late 40s, arrived in New York City. She credited the discovery of her vocal range to singing along to saxophonist Freddy Gardner's recording of "Body and Soul", a record she had turned up in a Manhattan store's bargain bin.

== Career ==
Almost nothing is known about the early development of Moss's talents. At the age of 17, in October 1935, she copyrighted a song called "You've Set My Heart On Fire" as Lorita Waynesboro, and in August 1937 she copyrighted another, called "Confusion" under the name of Lorita Waynesboro Davis. At her graduation with honors in 1936 from Garnet High School in Charleston, she played Mendelssohn's "War March of The Priests" on piano at the convocation. During her time in New York in the late 1940s leading up to her first public appearances and first commercial recordings in 1949, she recorded two sides on shellac at Nola Recording Studios. Nola was a popular local rehearsal venue which also offered private recording services for artists and bands. This non-commercial recording only came to light in 2022 pursuant to a media donation to the Internet Archive for the purposes of digitization and historical record.

Moss first came to public attention following a 1949 debut at New York's Park Avenue Restaurant, where a positive reception led to a stay of over 7 months. Liner notes from her later 1956 Epic LP state that appearances in London, Ontario, and Cleveland, Ohio, followed, but no independent reportage – music press or otherwise – can be found to support it. These same liner notes also mis-state her place of birth as Akron, Ohio, which is not consistent with census or marriage records. She is placed performing at jazz DJ and impresario Leonard Feather's contemporary concerts, including at Soldier Meyer's Brooklyn Bop House, the Pomp Room, the Sing Song Room of the Confucius Restaurant, and the Town And Country Restaurant. Initially billed as "Reta" Moss, her first 4 sides on shellac were released in January 1950 on Futurama Records, a local label run by Main Stem record store owner Arthur Bangel. Bangel formed Futurama to cut jazz, blues and rhythm, including artists involved in Feathers' contemporary bop concerts at Carnegie Hall.

In the early 1950s, Moss cut a few singles on Debonair, Decca and Mercury, including a four-song EP on Clef (Verve) in 1952 with Chicago's George Williams Orchestra, although her first LP, Introducing Rita Moss, was issued by Epic Records only in 1956. The selections were standards by Hart, Rodgers, Gershwin, Webster and Ellington; the release was notable in that one number was an original by Moss. A brief review in Billboard notes her "remarkable" vocal range and "breezy whimsical style". In 1956, she headlined at the Living Room night club in New York, and in 1957, decided to head for the West Coast.

From 1957 to 1966 Moss appears to have focused on touring and night-club appearances. Sporadic singles cropped up on obscure labels and a four-song EP appeared on Moss's private Los Angeles-based label Rozell, including at least one self-penned song, "Bobby's Blues", copyrighted under the name of Rita Roszelle. This period shows Moss honing exotica type vocal gymnastics in the vein of Yma Sumac to whom she had earlier drawn comparisons. The Gothic single features an arranging credit to Jack Montrose, a key West Coast jazz figure. The turn of the 1960s saw Moss playing LA area venues including Hollywood's Exotica Club and the Tahitian Village. In 1964 she did two consecutive extended stints at the Riverside Hotel's Showboat Lounge, playing simultaneous organ and piano with vocal. In 1966 she turned up at a popular San Diego club where her second album, of live material, Rita Moss Reigns at Islandia, was issued on the Islandia's house label and generated considerable local acclaim for her vocal range, Sumac-esque stylizing and scat vocals. Airplay and coverage by radio and TV stations such as KOGO, KFMX and KFMB (then home of Regis Philbin) attracted the attention of Dot Records who went on to issue three albums.

Talk to Me Tiger!, the first Dot LP, consisted of several familiar live club repertoire numbers from the Islandia LP, plus ballad material; the next LP, Superb, was arranged and conducted by Marty Paich. In 1968, the third and last Dot LP produced a now obscure eponymous single, that would become arguably Moss's most enduring song: "Just a Dream Ago", although the LP also included a worthy cover of "Sleep Safe and Warm", the theme from the film Rosemary's Baby.

In the 1970s Moss recorded an LP of spiritual jazz issued on the private Retep label in San Diego. The compositions were mostly self-penned, with a lyrics co-credit to Dr. Russell Paul Schofield, founder-director of Actualism for Lightworkers, a spiritual training regime. Moss continued to perform live in San Diego and Los Angeles into the 2000s.

== Personal life ==
Lorita Waynesboro was born to parents Wayne Bernice Waynesboro and Minnie Peters. Prior to her settlement in New York, school and marriage records place Moss in Charleston, West Virginia and Lawrence, Ohio. She had two sisters, Elnore and Frances, three and seven years younger respectively.

Moss appears to have never publicly discussed her family life; records show her father serving jail time as of 1935 and in a court case with Minnie over a property dispute, and as of 1940 the entire family living in an extended household with Fred Waynesboro (to whom Minnie is now married), and Lorita, now 21, married to Melvin Davis.

She married Herbert Richard Moss on March 15, 1944, in Lawrence, Ohio, and retained the Moss surname for the duration of her professional career.

As of 1964, Rita Moss was married to Bob Roszelle who was also her manager.

She died on July 16, 2015, at her residence in San Diego, California, at the age of 97.

== Discography ==
- 1949 – "I Should Know" / "No One"; Futurama 3008 single
- 1950 – "Tradin' In the Old for a New" / "I'm in the Middle Again"; Futurama 3009 single
- 1951 – "I Never Was So Surprised" / "I'll Be Waiting for You"; Glenn Records 1001 78 rpm. Billed as Rita Moss and The Satisfiers (Sonny Dunham Orchestra)
- 1951 – "Darlin'" / "Love Me or Please Let Me Be"; Decca 27873 single 78 rpm
- 1953 – "You Never Had It So Good" / "When Day Is Done"; Mercury/Clef 89024 78 rpm 89024x45 45 rpm single
- 1953 – "You Never Had It So Good" / "When Day Is Done" / "Happiness Is Just a Thing Called Joe" / "Memories of You"; Clef EPC 256 45 rpm
- 1956 – Introducing Rita Moss; Epic LN 3201 LP (12"), Philips B-07865R (10")
- 1957 – "My Ole Kentucky Home" / "I Should Know"; Debonair 1839 single 45 rpm
- 1959 – A-side: "Daydream" / "Bobby's Blues" / B-side: "CHY-A-CHA" / "Irish Jag"; Rozell K80H-1198
- 1959 – A-side: "Irish Jag" / "Linger Awhile" / B-side: "Passion Flower" / "Bobby's Blues"; 45 rpm EP V-Tone V-101
- 1960 – "Zatika Part 1" / "Zatika Part 2"; Rozell 205 single
- 1961 – "Jaggin'" / "Exactly Like You" (as "Voices of Rita Moss); Gothic 003 45rpm single
- 1964 - "Jingle Bells" / "I'm Shooting High"; Arvee 5084 single 45 rpm
- 1964 – "My Melancholy Baby" / "Red Balloon"; Challenge 59245 45 rpm single
- 1966 – Reigns at Islandia; retep RTP-M 1381 LP
- 1966 – Talk to Me, Tiger!; Dot DLP 25763 (S) 3763 (M) LP
- 1968 – Superb; Dot DLP 25839 (S) 3838 (M) LP
- 1968 – "Just a Dream Ago" / "The Measure of a Man"; Dot 17120 45 rpm single
- 1968 – Just a Dream Ago; Dot DLP 25889 (S) LP
- 1977 – Inner Experience Vol. 1; Retep CG-011 LP
- 2019 – Queen Moss 1951-1959; Fresh Sound Records FSR-CD 983, compilation
