= Garnet High School =

- U.S. National Register of Historic Places
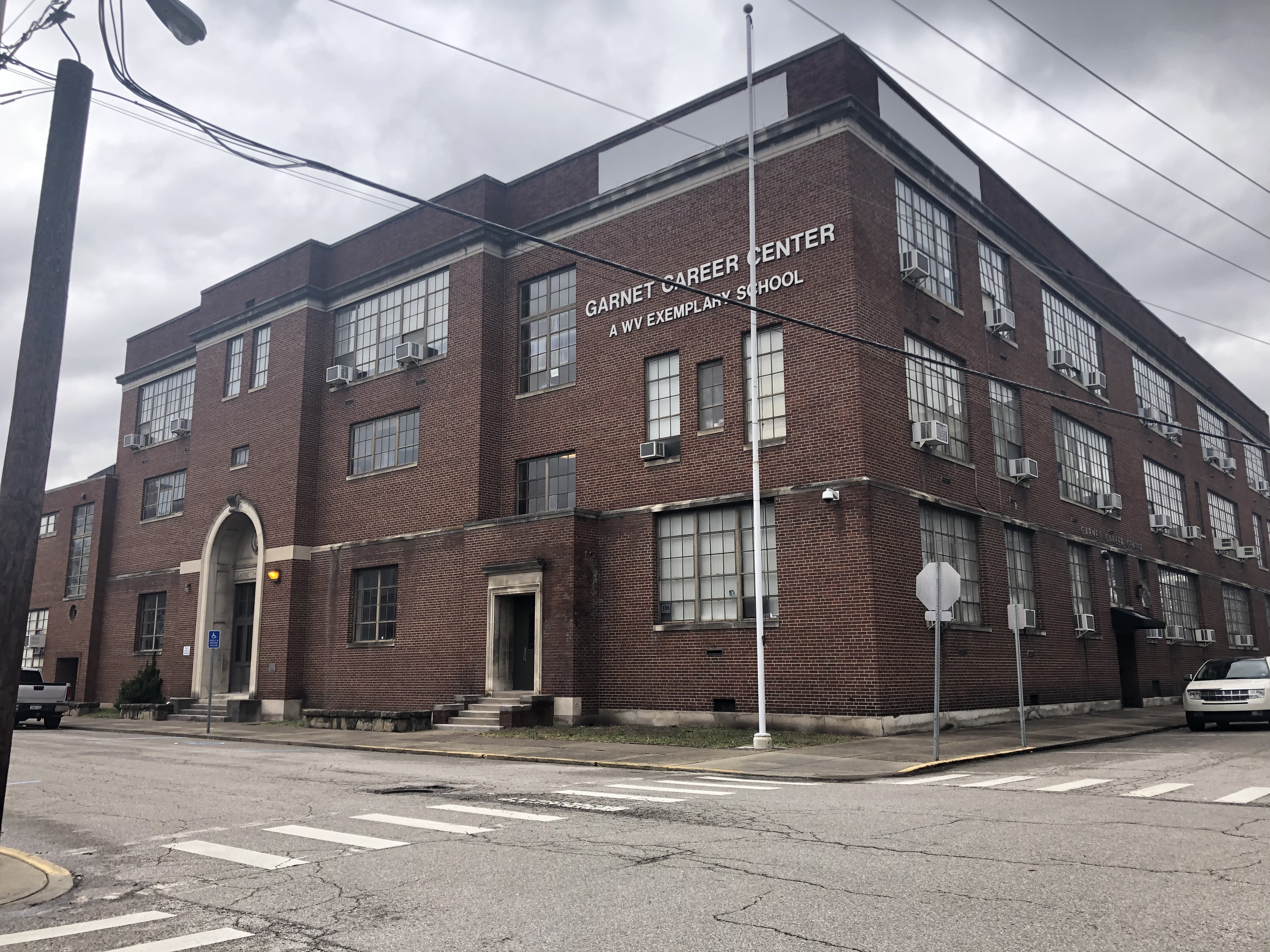

- Location within West Virginia Location within the United States
- Location: 422 Dickinson St., Charleston, West Virginia
- Coordinates: 38°21′4″N 81°37′48″W
- Area: The Block
- Built: 1928
- Architect: Warne, Tucker, Silling & Hutchison
- Architectural style: Classical Revival
- NRHP reference No.: 90001068
- Added to NRHP: July 24, 1990

Garnet High School, also known as Garnet Career Center and Garnet Adult Education Center, is a historic African-American high school in Charleston, West Virginia. The school was established when "twelve African-American students in Kanawha County passed an entrance examination for high school level course work." It was named after Henry Highland Garnet, a former slave who became the United States' ambassador to Liberia. It is a three-story, brick structure, constructed in 1928-29 from the plans of the prestigious Charleston architectural firm of Warne, Tucker, Silling and Hutchison, and dedicated December 2 to 4, 1929. The façade features a limestone-arched entrance containing two sets of double doors, transom light, and a limestone tympanum. Garnet was one of three high schools in the Kanawha Valley built for African-American students. It closed as a high school in 1956, following integration of the public schools, but has been used as a public resource building since that time.

It was listed on the National Register of Historic Places in 1990.

== Alumni ==
Singer, musical performer and Dot Records recording artist Rita Moss graduated in 1936. At her convocation she played Mendelssohn's "War March of The Priests" on piano.

Oscar Holmes (1916–2001) graduated from this school and became the first African-American Naval Aviator and air traffic controller.

== Gallery ==
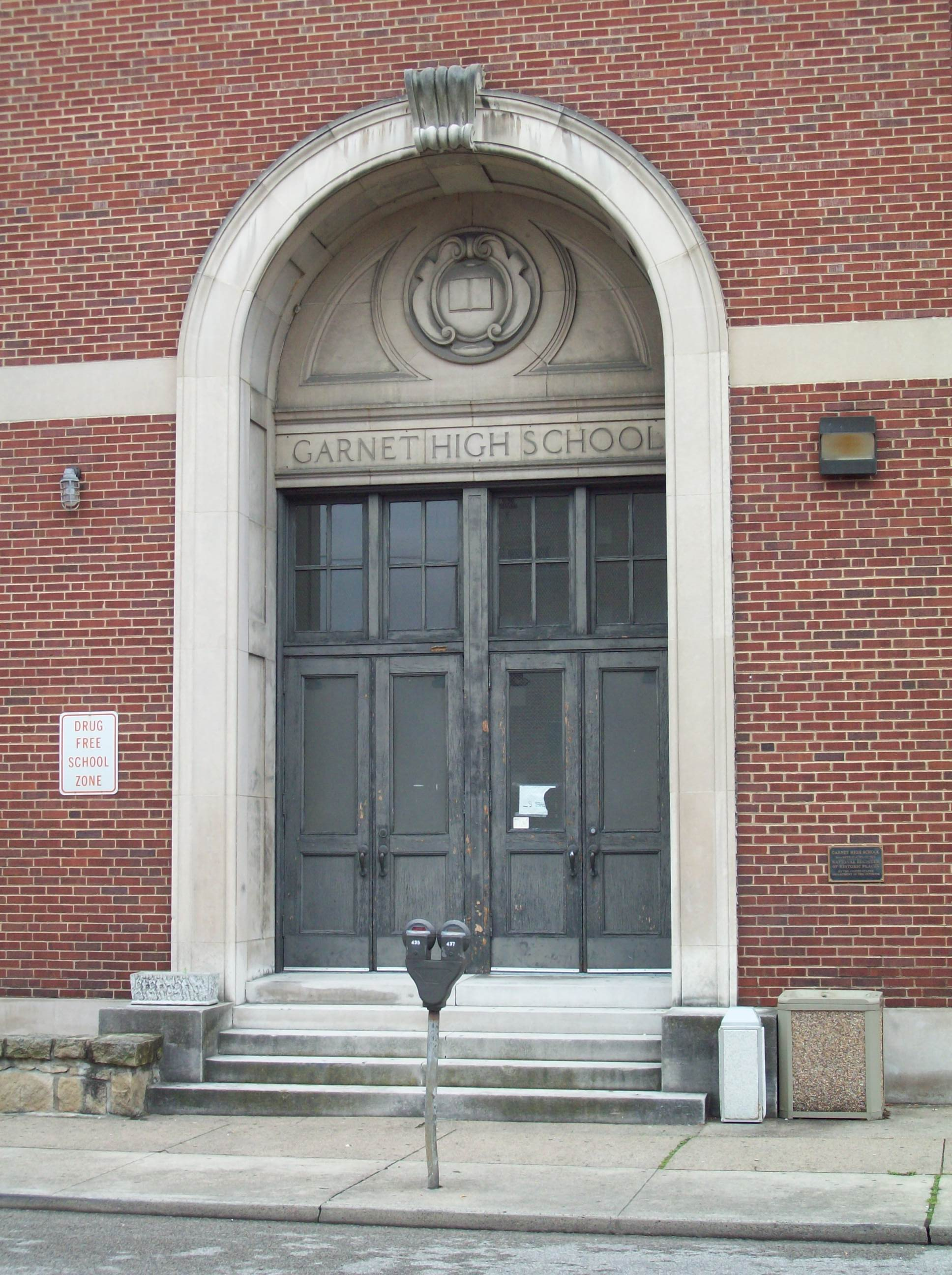
Garnet High School entry, April 2009
