= SS Bosnia =

Five steamships have borne the name Bosnia, after Bosnia:

- SS Bosnia (1878) was a 339-ton cargo ship launched in August 1878, by Abendroth in Rostock, North German Confederation. Sold to Argentina and renamed Toro in 1889, she was wrecked off Chile on 16 July 1907.
- SS Bosnia (1898) was a 2,548-ton passenger/cargo ship built in 1898, by Ansaldo in Sestri Ponente, Italy. Shelled and sunk by a submarine around 100 nautical miles (190 km; 120 mi) north-north-east of Derna, Libya on 10 November 1915, with the loss of 12 lives.
- SS Bosnia (Jarrow, 1898) was a 7,436-ton passenger/cargo ship launched on 18 August 1898, by Palmers' in Jarrow, England, for the Hamburg America Line. Sold in 1922 to Hong Kong and renamed Frangestan. Lost in a fire on 2 April 1924
- SS Bosnia (1899) was a 530-ton passenger/cargo ship launched on 20 May 1899 by Lloyd Austriaco in Trieste, Austria-Hungary. Transferred to Yugoslavia in 1922 and renamed Bosna. Seized by the Italians in 1941 and renamed Lissa. Bombed and sunk by aircraft at Zara, Italy, on 17 August 1944.
- SS Bosnia (1928) was a 2,402-ton cargo ship launched on 6 February 1928, by Thompson, J.L. in North Sands, England. Torpedoed and sunk by the German U-boat U-47 on 5 September 1939.
