= Betsy Plank =

Public relations executive

- Born: April 3, 1924; Tuscaloosa, Alabama
- Died: May 23, 2010 (aged 86)
- Education: University of Alabama
- Occupation: Public relations

Betsy Ann Plank (3 April 1924–23 May 2010) is commonly referred to as the first lady of public relations. In her 63-year-long career, she achieved many first in public relations leadership positions for women.

The Arthur W. Page Center for Integrity in Public Communication recognized her as a "PR pioneer... and champion of public relations education". The New York Times referred to her as "a true trailblazer in the field of public relations".

== Early life ==
Plank was born in Tuscaloosa, Alabama on 3 April 1924. She received a bachelor's degree in history and a minor in English literature from the University of Alabama. The university had no public relations major when she attended, which inspired her efforts to develop and advance public relations education. Following her 1944 graduation from the University of Alabama, she moved to Chicago in 1947 and began an unsuccessful career in radio broadcasting. Through her radio broadcasting career, Plank was able to meet her first mentor, Duffy Schwartz, one of the city's only female executives. Through Schwartz, Plank was first introduced to public relations when she was recommended to work a temporary position for a non-profit organization. Because of her performance, Plank was offered a permanent position that she held throughout the 1950s.

== Career ==
Plank's career as a public relations executive began in 1960 when she began working with Daniel J. Edelman, Inc. (now known as Edelman Public Relations Worldwide). She served as the executive vice president and treasurer from 1960 to 1973. In 1973, she became the director of public relations planning for AT&T. Following her brief stint at AT&T, Plank transferred to Illinois Bell (now SBC Communications Inc.) and became the head of a staff of a 102-person department, directing external affairs. In this role she was the first woman to head a company department. Plank says she faced her greatest career challenge during her 17 years at SBC, being SBC's divestiture of the Bell System. On the difficulty of the situation, Plank stated that "we had a couple of years to break up the world's largest corporation and prepare it without a single missed step."

In 1963, she became the first female president of the Publicity Club of Chicago, a position that is now referred to as chair and CEO.

In 1967, she helped create the Public Relations Student Society of America (PRSSA), which is the student affiliate of the Public Relations Society of America (PRSA), to help students advance their knowledge of public relations and network with public relations professionals.

In 1979, she helped establish The Chicago Network. Chicago Tribune described it in 2010 as "a still-prominent organization of professional women."

From 1981 until 1983, Plank, known as the godmother of PRSSA, partnered with Jon Riffel, known as the godfather of PRSSA, to start a group now called Champions for PRSSA. This group was composed of public relations professionals with a special interest in public relations education and PRSSA students. Beginning in 1988, the Champions for PRSSA began giving out scholarships which would later be given out in Plank's name. Between the program's inception in 1988 and 2005, more than $65,000 scholarships had been awarded for those seeking an education in the field.

In 1987, she served as the co-chair of the 1987 Commission on Undergraduate Public Relations Education, which was responsible for the development of guidelines for public relations education curricula, both undergraduate and graduate education at colleges and universities across the country. In 1989, Plank played a key role in creating PRSA's Certification in Education in Public Relations program, which provides the opportunity for universities to obtain PRSA's feedback about their public relations programs and potentially earn PRSA's endorsement. She also became a founding member of the PRSA College of Fellows.

In 1990, Plank left Illinois Bell and started a public relations agency in Chicago called Betsy Plank Public Relations.

In 2005, she endowed the Plank Center for Leadership in Public Relations at the University of Alabama. Its mission is to "help develop and recognize outstanding leaders and role models in public relations." The Center works through a wide array of programs, along with groups and student organizations, in order to develop future leaders in public relations through the development of ethical and effective practices. The program is the 12th in the nation to be certified by the PRSSA and has grown to be the largest undergraduate program within the University of Alabama's College of Communication and Information Sciences. Every April since 2017, the Plank Center hosts a #BetsyPlank Day competition, challenging PRSSA chapters across the US to implement coordinated social media campaigns.

During her career, she served as the president of United Christian Community Services, a coalition including nine community agencies. She also was a board member of United Way, Girl Scouts of Chicago, and Girl Scouts of the USA.

== Beliefs ==
Plank contributed to the credibility of and respect for the field of public relations and public relations education, stating that "the hallmark of every respected profession is a formal program of study." Plank expressed that the future of public relations depends on education and research. She emphasized the importance of interpersonal communication: "Communications technology is a magical, wonderful tool, but simply a tool. It will never replace the human encounter." Plank also called for increased credibility, ethics and transparency in the practice of public relations. During her speech for the Alexander Hamilton award in 2000, Plank stated, "Public relations is fundamental to a democratic society where people make decisions in the workplace, the marketplace, the community and in the voting booth. Its primary mission is to forge responsible relationships of understanding, trust and respect among groups and individuals – even though they often disagree."

== Awards ==
Plank received the Gold Anvil Award (PRSA's top award) in 1977 in recognition of her lifetime achievements.

She is the only person to be president of four Chicago communications organizations: the Publicity Club of Chicago in 1963, the Welfare Public Relations Forum from 1966 to 1967, the Chicago Chapter PRSA in 1969, and the Public Relations Forum in 1979.

Plank was the first woman elected by Public Relations News readers for the title of Professional of the Year in 1979.

Plank was recognized as one of the World's 40 Outstanding Public Relations Leaders by Public Relations News in 1984.

PRSA awarded her the Paul M. Lund Public Service Award in 1989.

PRSSA recognized Plank with the 25th Anniversary Award in 1993.

Plank was the first recipient of the PRSA Educators Academy's David W. Ferguson Award in 1997, an award that recognizes outstanding contributions to public relations education by a public relations professional.

Plank became the first person to receive the Arthur W. Page Society's Distinguished Service Award in 2000, formerly called the Lifetime Achievement Award. Also in 2000, Plank was the first woman to receive the Alexander Hamilton Award, an award for significant contributions to the field of public relations, from the Institute for Public Relations

Plank received the Patrick Jackson Award for Distinguished Service to PRSA in 2001. Also in 2001, Plank was inducted into the University of Alabama's Communication Hall of Fame in 2001, and five other universities also gave her similar honors for her leadership as a public relations professional.

== Personal life ==
As a social activist, Plank traveled to Alabama in 1965 to participate in the final part of the Civil Rights March from Selma to Montgomery.

Plank married film producer and editor Sherman V. Rosenfield. They bought a powerboat called Yearling for their first anniversary of their marriage which is kept in Lake Michigan. Following her husband's death in 1990, she spent many summers on the Yearling in the harbor, talking with friends and feeding the ducks.
