= Evanston/Skokie School District 65 =

School district in Cook County, Illinois

Address
- 1500 McDaniel Avenue Evanston, Illinois, Cook, 60201; US

District information
- Motto: Every Child, Every Day, Whatever it Takes.
- Grades: Prekindergarten – 8th
- Chair of the board: Dr. Nichole Pinkard

Students and staff
- Students: 5,568
- Staff: 1,400
- Student–teacher ratio: 1:21

Other information
- Website: district65.net

The Evanston/Skokie School District 65 is a school district headquartered in Evanston, Illinois, north of Chicago, United States. The district serves Evanston and Skokie, operating elementary schools, middle schools, and K–8 schools.

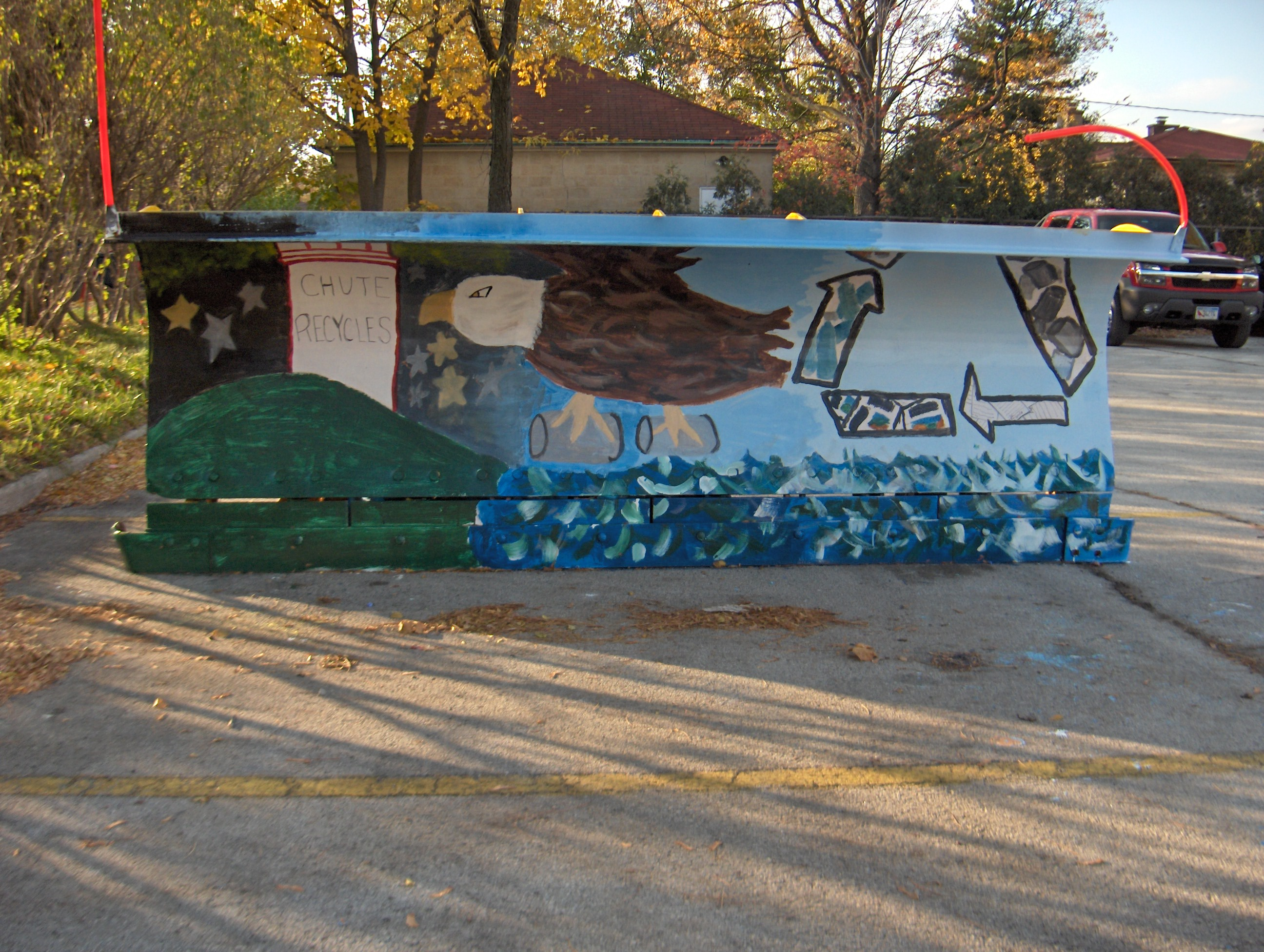
An Evanston city snowplow blade painted by District 65 middle school students

== Schools ==
=== K–8 schools ===
There are two selective enrollment schools in the district.

- Martin Luther King Jr. Literary and Fine Arts School (Evanston)

=== Middle schools ===
- Chute Middle School (Evanston)
- Haven Middle School (Evanston)
- Nichols Middle School (Evanston)

=== Elementary schools ===
- Dawes Elementary School (Evanston)
- Dewey Elementary School (Evanston)
- Foster Elementary School (Evanston)
- Lincoln Elementary School (Evanston)
- Lincolnwood Elementary School (Evanston)
- Oakton Elementary School (Evanston)
- Orrington Elementary School (Evanston)
- Walker Elementary School (Skokie)
- Washington Elementary School (Evanston)
- Willard Elementary School (Evanston)

=== Early childhood ===
- Joseph E. Hill (JEH) Education Center (Evanston)

Also one of the headquarters in the district.

=== Special schools ===
- Park School (Evanston) – For students ages 3–21: students with physical and/or learning difficulties
- Daniel and Ada Rice Education Center (REC) (Evanston) – Disciplinary school

== See also ==
- List of school districts in Illinois
