= Ludwig Brackebusch =

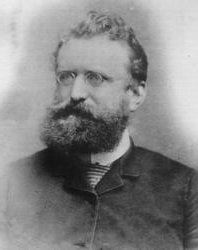
- Born: 4 March 1849; Northeim, Kingdom of Hanover (German Confederation)
- Died: 2 June 1906 (aged 57); Hannover, German Empire
- Citizenship: German
- Education: University of Göttingen (PhD)
- Known for: his study on the High Andes, especially the Penitente (snow formation) and the first geological map of Argentina (in Spanish and German)
- Awards: Prussian Order of the Red Eagle, fourth class (1855)
- Scientific career
- Fields: geology, mineralogy, paleontology

Ludwig Brackebusch (4 March 1849 – 2 June 1906) was a German geologist, mineralogist, and paleontologist, who was a pioneer of geology in Argentina. He was a professor at the University of Córdoba.

== Life ==
Brackebusch grew up in the Harz Mountains, studied theology and geology from 1869 and mathematics and natural sciences from 1871 at the University of Göttingen, where he received his doctorate in 1874 (development of the geognostic conditions in the area between Falkenstein and Königerode in the Lower Harz) with a thesis written while working as an assistant geologist at the Prussian Geological Survey, where he mapped the Harz Mountains from 1873 to 1875. From 1875, at the invitation of Hermann Burmeister, he succeeded Alfred Wilhelm Stelzner (who moved to the Freiberg Mining Academy) as Professor of Mineralogy and Director of the Mineralogical Institute at the University of Córdoba in Argentina.

He undertook numerous research trips, including to the previously little-explored High Andes in northwestern Argentina, where he described the penitentes. He also investigated the passes to Chile, which was of importance to the Argentine government, and oil deposits in the Andean region. His knowledge of Argentine territory was based on explorations in the provinces of Córdoba, San Luis, Catamarca, Salta, and Jujuy. He collected extensive material and expanded the existing collections of the Mineralogy Museum by over 8,000 specimens. He sent duplicates of local rocks and minerals to Europe for exhibition and study. From 1880, he was a member of the National Academy of Sciences in Córdoba and eventually became its dean. His extensive fossil, rock, and mineral collection is housed primarily at the University of Córdoba, with a smaller portion at the Natural History Museum, Berlin (1,700 specimens of rocks and minerals from Argentina).

In 1877 he married Maria Emilia Charlotte Weule, with whom he had six children.

The German-Argentine chemist, geologist and zoologist Adolfo Doering named the mineral Brackebuschite after him in 1880.

In 1888, he returned to Lower Saxony and worked independently as a consulting geologist. His successor as professor in Córdoba was Wilhelm Bodenbender.

Around 1890, Brackebusch settled in Hanover.

In 1891, in Gotha, he published the first geological map of Argentina (in German and Spanish).

== Selected works ==
- Geological map of the interior of the Argentine Republic, Gotha 1891.
- Travels in the Cordilleras of the Argentine Republic. In: Proceedings of the Berlin Geographical Society, 18, 1891, pp. 53–79.
- Elevation map of the northwestern part of the Argentine Republic. Justus Perthes, Gotha 1893.
- Physiographic map of the northwestern part of the Argentine Republic. Justus Perthes, Gotha 1893.
- Mining Conditions in the Argentine Republic. In: Journal of Mining, Metallurgy, and Saltworks in the Prussian State, 41, 1893, pp. 1–33.
- Geological map of the province of Hanover and the adjacent regions, including mineral deposits, mineral springs, metallurgical plants, cement factories, mineral mills, etc., published by Hahn'sche Buchhandlung, Hanover & Leipzig 1899.
