= Dr. Martin Luther King Jr. Literary and Fine Arts School =

Coordinates: 42.0437°N 87.7081°W

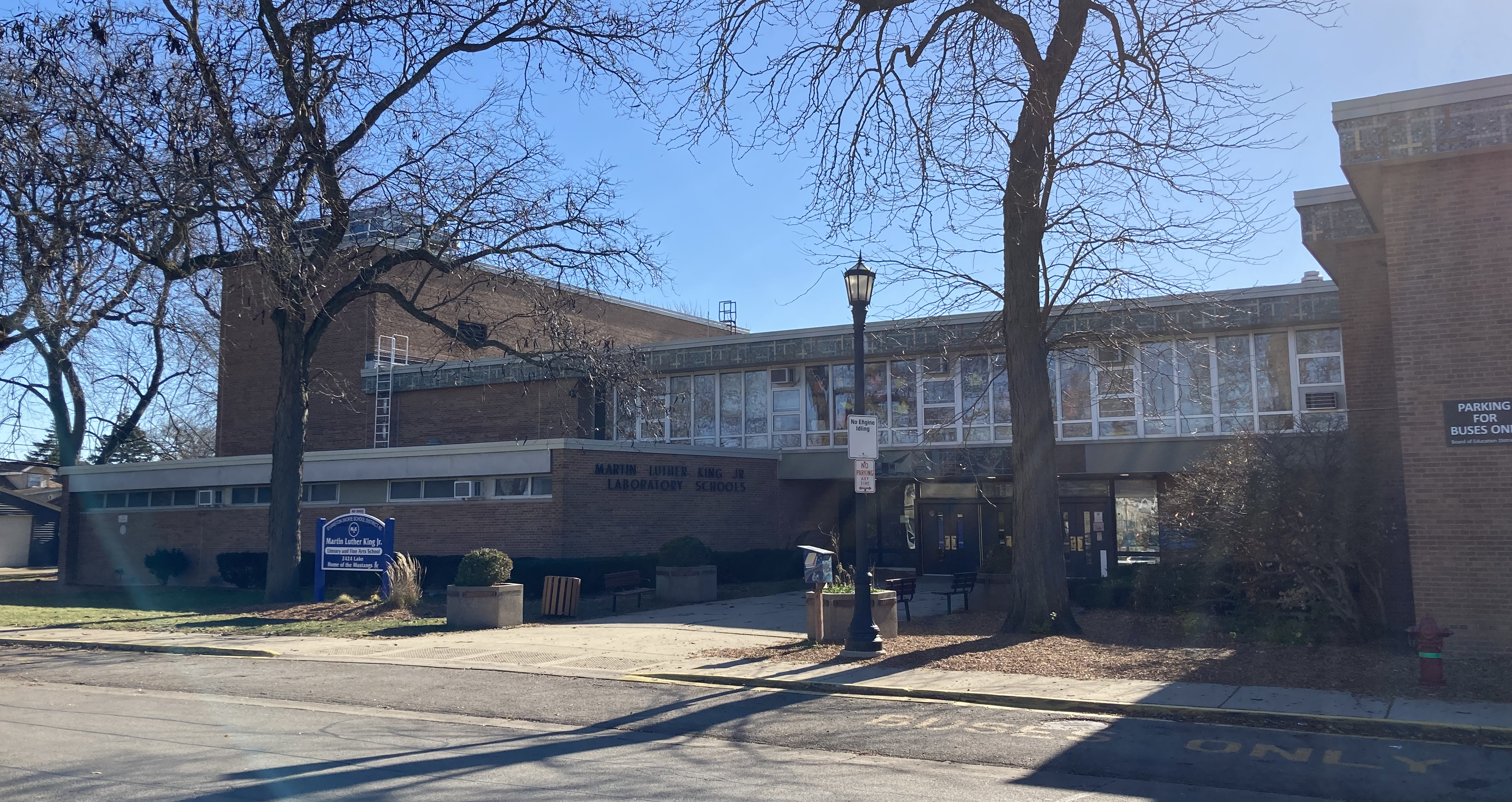

Location
- 2424 Lake Street; Evanston, Illinois 60201

Information
- School type: Public school
- Founded: 1967
- School district: Evanston-Skokie School District 65
- Principal: Dr. Henderson
- Grades: K-8
- Gender: co-ed
- Enrollment: 571
- Team name: Mustangs
- Website: district65.net/kingarts

Dr. Martin Luther King Jr. Literary and Fine Arts School, or King Arts, is a K-8 magnet school located in Evanston, Illinois. The school was formed in 1967 by combining Skiles Middle School, which had taught grades 6-8 and sat on the site of the current King Arts School and the original Martin Luther King Jr. Laboratory School, which had taught grades K-5 and was housed in the building of the old Foster School at Foster and Dewey.

== History ==
Foster School was a de facto segregated school in Evanston, Illinois named after Northwestern University president Randolph Sinks Foster. Founded in 1903 and opened in 1905, Foster School began with a one hundred percent white student body and faculty, but by 1945 it was nearly one hundred percent African American. Foster School was one of the only public schools in the Evanston area where African American children were encouraged to attend and where African-American teachers could find employment until 1967, when School District 65 was desegregated. The Foster School Reunion collection is housed at the Shorefront Legacy Center in Evanston, Illinois. The collection was processed by the Black Metropolis Consortium as part of the Color Curtain Processing Project.

In 1967, Foster School transitioned into the Martin Luther King Jr. Laboratory School in which 25% of the school's student body was African American during the first year of enrollment. The school moved from the Foster School building into the Skiles Middle School building in 1976.

By contrast with contemporaneous forced bussing of African-American students to historically white schools, King Lab as a magnet school brought voluntarily bussed white, Asian and Latino students to attend school on the site of Evanston's historically African-American school (Foster School) in its predominantly African-American neighborhood. This project integrated its schools while improving educational opportunities for Evanston's African-American children.

As the declining student population was causing a number of Evanston's elementary schools to close (including Foster School), the King Lab project survived by combining with Skiles Middle School, first in 1976 as a transitional grade 5-8 program called Ski-Lab on the site of Skiles Middle School and then moving grades K-4 to the site in 1978 to form a K-8 program under the name Martin Luther King Junior Laboratory School.

In 2011, following the school district's strategic planning initiative, the school took on a new "literary and fine arts focus," causing its renaming.
