= June 1924 =

Month of 1924

<<	June 1924					>>
Su	Mo	Tu	We	Th	Fr	Sa
1	2	3	4	5	6	7
8	9	10	11	12	13	14
15	16	17	18	19	20	21
22	23	24	25	26	27	28
29	30

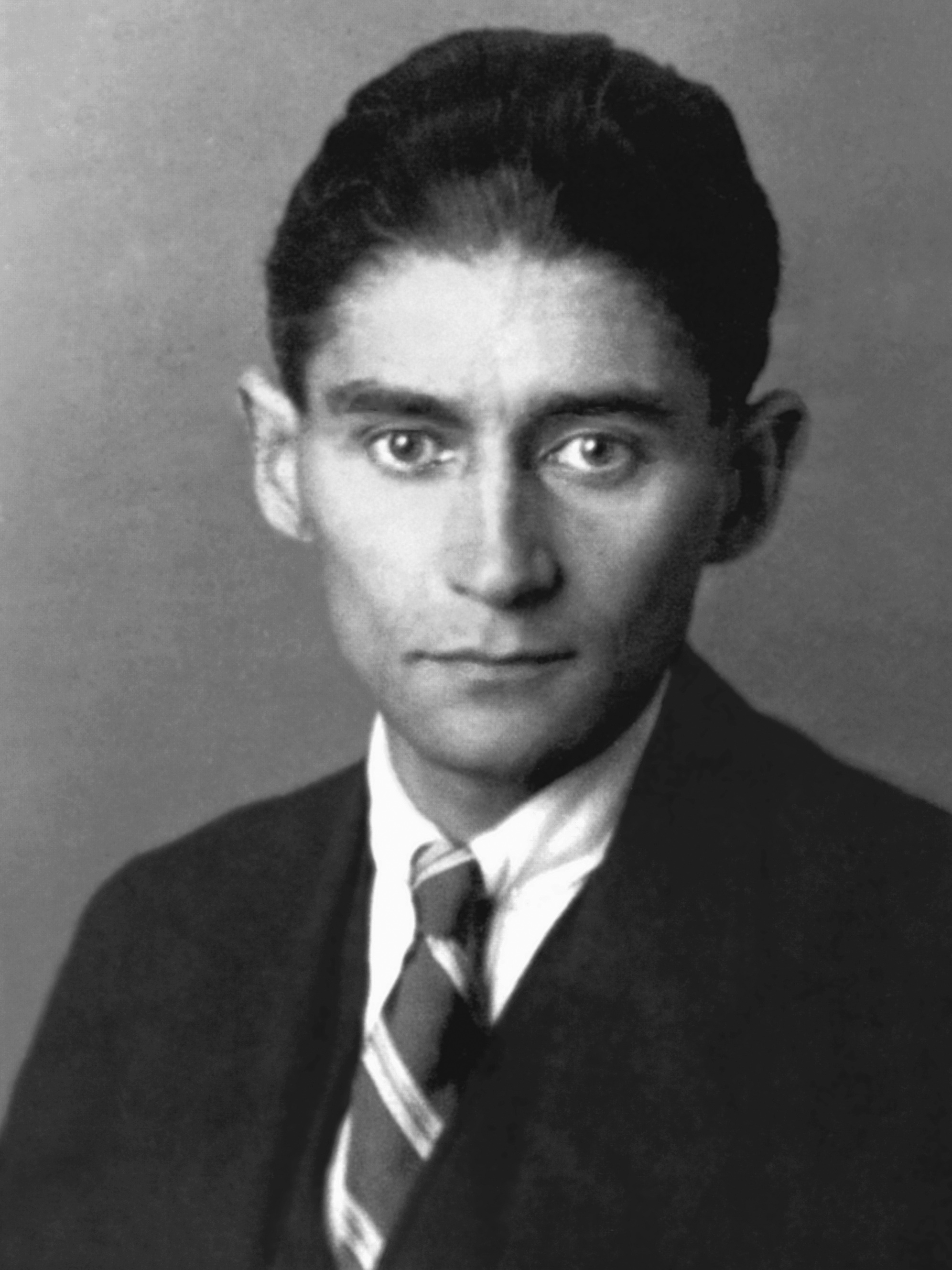
June 3, 1924: Renowned novelist Franz Kafka dies in obscurity in Austria

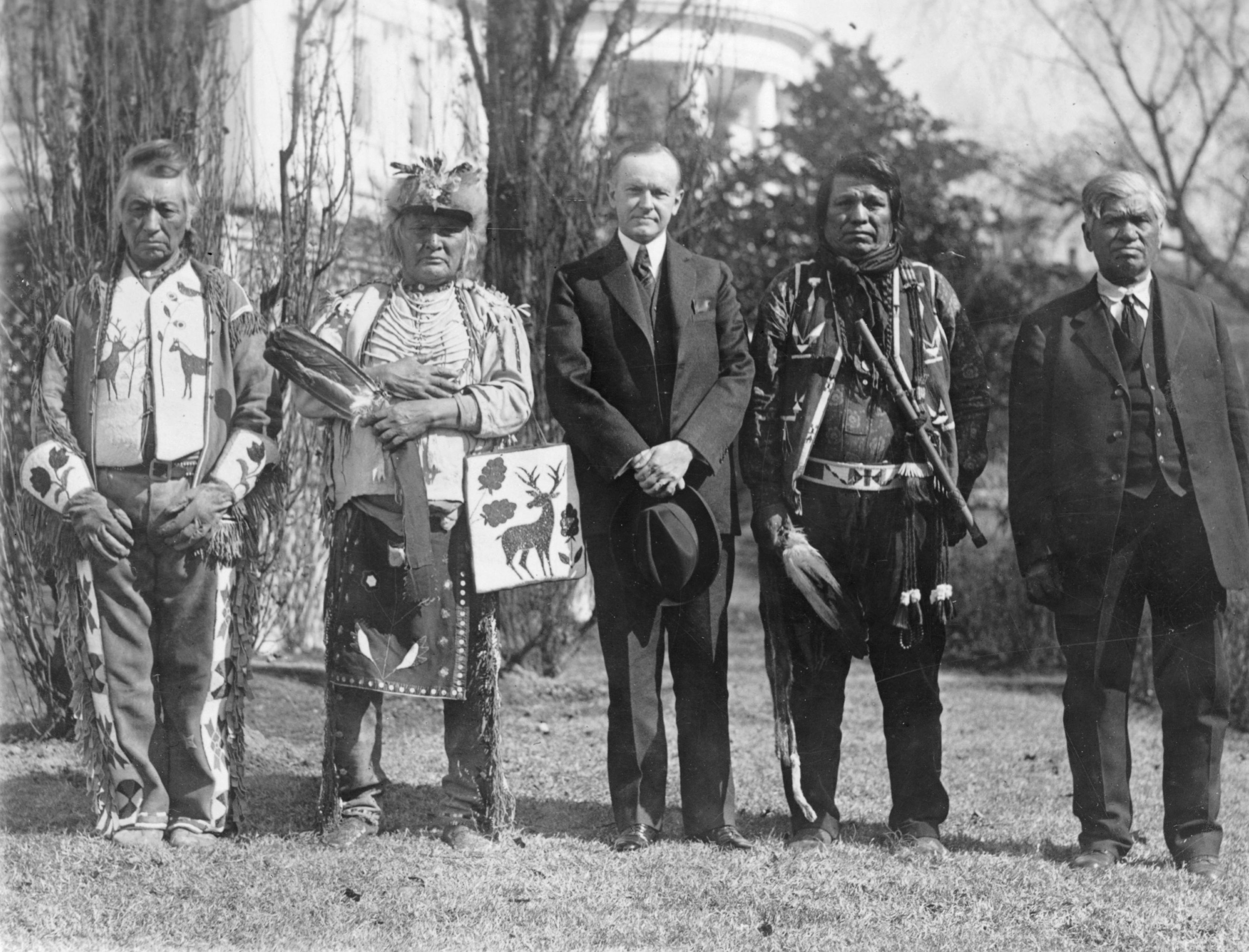
June 2, 1924: U.S. President Coolidge poses with Osage Indian representatives at signing of law granting U.S. citizenship to all American Indians

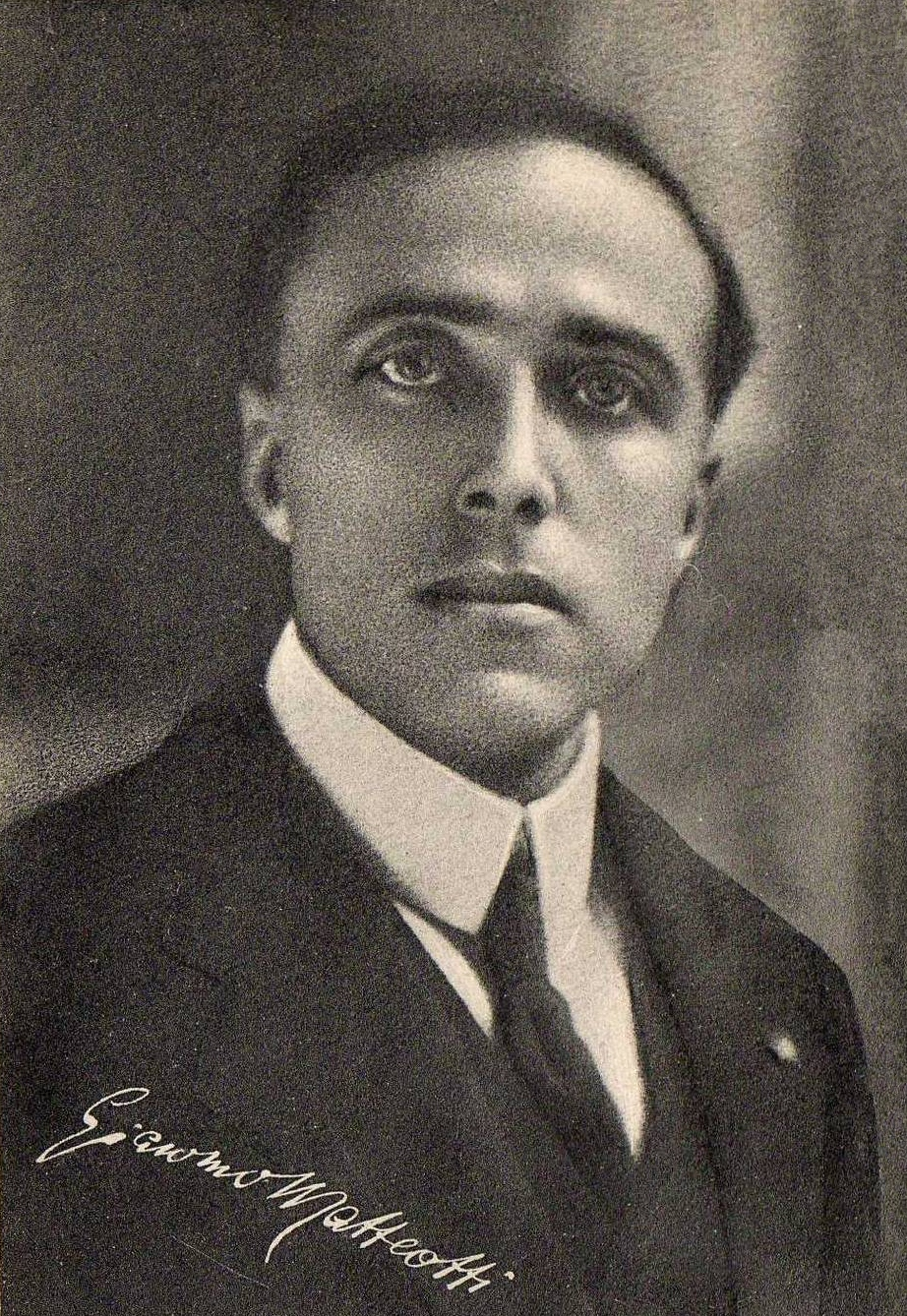
June 10, 1924: Fascists kidnap and murder Italian legislator Giacomo Matteotti after his harsh criticism of Prime Minister Mussolini

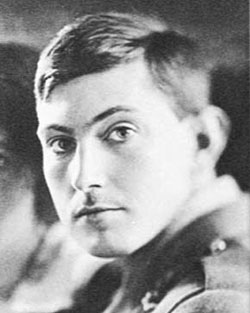
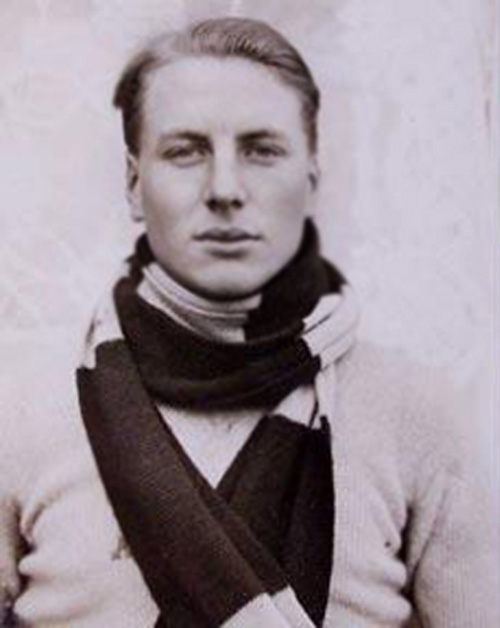
June 8, 1924: British climbers George Mallory and Andrew Irvine vanish during Mount Everest climb

The following events occurred in June 1924:

== June 1, 1924 (Sunday) ==
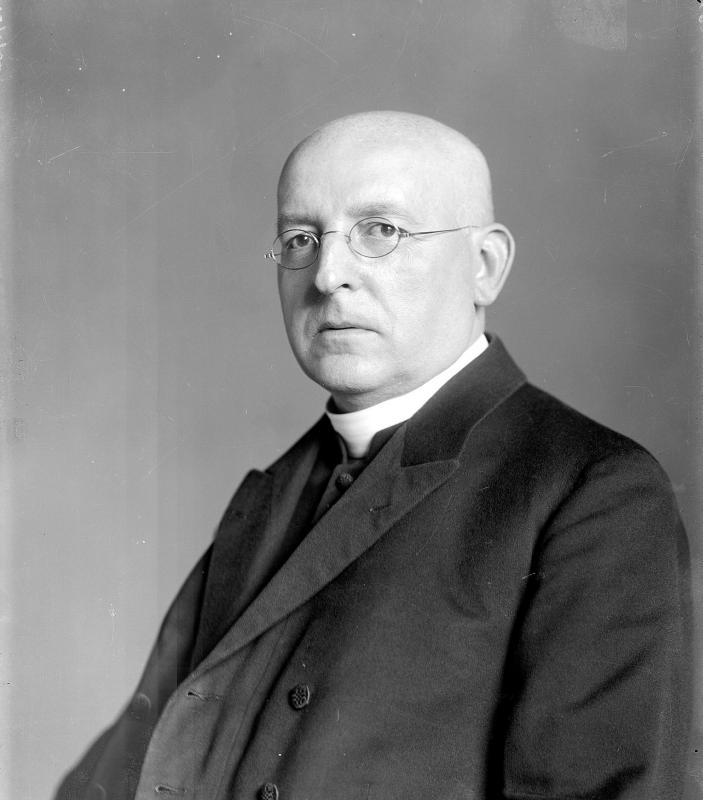
Seipel

- Austrian Chancellor Ignaz Seipel was shot by a disgruntled worker. A bullet was extracted from his lung and he survived.
- The June Revolution began in Albania as an army of 6,000 nationalists marched on Tirana.
- Raymond Poincaré resigned as Prime Minister of France along with his entire cabinet.
- The Bengal Provincial Congress Committee passed a resolution acknowledging the sacrifice of Gopinath Saha. It stated that 'this conference, while denouncing and dissociating itself from violence and adhering to the principle of non-violence, appreciates Gopinath Saha's idea of self-sacrifice, misguided though it is, in respect of the country's best interest and expresses respect for such self-sacrifice.' Mahatma Gandhi opposed the resolution.
- What would become one of the most widely-heard radio stations in the U.S. as well as a widely-seen television station was created as the Chicago Tribune newspaper purchased Chicago's WDAP radio station and renamed it WGN, an abbreviation of the Tribune slogan, "World's Greatest Newspaper".
- Born: William Sloane Coffin, Christian clergyman; in New York City (d. 2006)

== June 2, 1924 (Monday) ==
- In the United States, the Indian Citizenship Act was signed into law by President Calvin Coolidge, recognizing U.S. citizenship for all indigenous Native Americans (referred to at the time as "American Indians") who had been born within the United States and its territories, regardless of whether they had been granted citizenship by other means, such as service in the U.S. military or formal renunciation of tribal affiliation. At the time, there were 300,000 Native Americans in the U.S., of whom 175,000 had already been granted U.S. citizenship, out of a population measured in 1920 as 106,021,537 people.
- The Soviet Communist Party Central Committee selected the seven members of the Politburo, the de facto rulers of the Soviet Union. To replace the vacancy left by the death of Vladimir Lenin, candidate member Nikolai Bukharin was elevated to full status, while full members Joseph Stalin, Leon Trotsky, Alexei Rykov, Lev Kamenev, Mikhail Tomsky and Grigory Zinoviev were re-elected.
- U.S. President Coolidge signed the Revenue Act of 1924 into law, despite his many criticisms of the bill.
- The Frank Lloyd-directed film The Sea Hawk premiered at the Astor Theatre in New York City.
- In Germany, miners in the Ruhr ended their strike after accepting a 6 percent wage increase.
- Born:
  - Eric Voice, British Scottish nuclear scientist known for his decision to voluntarily ingest plutonium to demonstrate his belief that exposure was not lethal; in London (died of neurological disease, 2004)
  - June Callwood, Canadian journalist, writer and activist; in Chatham, Ontario (d. 2007)

== June 3, 1924 (Tuesday) ==
- The Gila Wilderness, which would become the first government-protected wilderness area (defined as an area not significantly affected by human activity) in the world, was founded in the U.S. state of New Mexico as the first wilderness area in the National Forest System. The designation followed the lobbying efforts of Aldo Leopold, the United States Forest Service supervisor of the Carson National Forest, who proposed that the headwaters area of the Gila River should be preserved by an administrative process of excluding roads and denying use permits.
- In Albania, fighting was reported in Shkodër and Vlorë, while an Italian destroyer arrived at the port of Durrës. It was thought that Italy might intervene in the June Revolution if any Italian interests in Albania were threatened.
- Born:
  - Torsten Wiesel, Swedish neurophysiologist and 1981 recipient of the Nobel Prize in Physiology or Medicine; in Uppsala (alive in 2026)
  - Muthuvel Karunanidhi, Indian author and politician who served four times as Chief Minister of the state of Tamil Nadu (1969–1976; 1989–1991; 1996-2001 and 2006–2011); in Thirukkuvalai, Madras Province, British India (d. 2018)
  - Jay Van Andel, American businessman and billionaire who co-founded the Amway Corporation; in Grand Rapids, Michigan (d. 2004)
  - Herk Harvey, American film director, actor and producer known for Carnival of Souls; in Windsor, Colorado (d. 1996)
- Died: Franz Kafka, 40, Austro-Hungarian-born author and playwright, died of starvation due to complications from laryngeal tuberculosis.

== June 4, 1924 (Wednesday) ==
- Indian physicist Satyendra Nath Bose contacted Albert Einstein to report his development of what would become known as the Bose–Einstein statistics. Bose mailed his short manuscript, Planck's Law and the Light Quantum Hypothesis to Einstein to get it published after the prestigious journal Philosophical Magazine rejected it. Einstein, recognizing the importance of the paper, translated it from English into German himself and submitted it on Bose's behalf to the prestigious Zeitschrift für Physik. Einstein would later apply Bose's principles on particles with mass and quickly predict the Bose-Einstein condensate.
- Anti-government forces in Albania captured Shkodër.
- The E.M. Forster novel A Passage to India was first published, originally by the British imprint Edward Arnold. It would be published in the U.S. August 14, 1924, by Harcourt, Brace and Company.
- Born: Dennis Weaver, American TV and film actor, known for McCloud, Gunsmoke and Gentle Ben, as well as being president of the Screen Actors Guild, 1973 to 1975.; in Joplin, Missouri (d. 2006)

== June 5, 1924 (Thursday) ==
- Nathan Leopold and Richard Loeb were indicted on 11 counts of murder and 16 counts of kidnapping arising from the death of Bobby Franks.
- Born: Art Donovan, American football player and inductee to the Pro Football Hall of Fame; in The Bronx, New York (d. 2013)
- Died: Qian Nengxun, 55, former Premier of the Republic of China, 1918 to 1919

== June 6, 1924 (Friday) ==
- Germany's Reichstag approved the Dawes Plan by a vote of 247 to 183.
- Belva Gaertner was acquitted of murder in Chicago; her story partially inspired the play Chicago.
- Cyril Walker of England won the U.S. Open golf tournament by three strokes over Bobby Jones of the U.S., at Oakland Hills Country Club in the Detroit suburb of Birmingham, Michigan.

== June 7, 1924 (Saturday) ==
- The Canada men's national soccer team played its first international match, a 3 to 2 loss to the Australian national team in Brisbane, Queensland on June 7, 1924.
- The United States enacted the Clarke–McNary Act, facilitating the purchase of land to expand the National Forest System. On the same day, U.S. President Coolidge signed the Anti-Heroin Act of 1924 and the Oil Pollution Act of 1924 into law.
- Born:
  - Dolores Gray (stage name for Sylvia Dolores Finkelstein), American stage actress and singer, winner of a Tony Award for Carnival in Flanders; in Los Angeles (d. 2002)
  - William Close, American surgeon who played a major role in stemming a 1976 outbreak of the Ebola virus in Zaire; in Greenwich, Connecticut (d. 2009)
  - Ed Farhat, U.S. professional wrestler known as "The Sheik"; in Lansing, Michigan (d. 2003)
  - Bob Tizard, Deputy Prime Minister of New Zealand, 1974 to 1975; in Auckland (d. 2016)

== June 8, 1924 (Sunday) ==
- British mountain climbers George Mallory and Andrew "Sandy" Irvine, seeking to become the first persons to climb to the top of the world's highest mountain, Mount Everest, were last seen alive as Noel Odell watched the two men ascend from a base camp. For almost 75 years, no trace of either climber would be found until the discovery of Mallory's body on May 1, 1999, at an altitude of 26,760 feet (8,160 m).

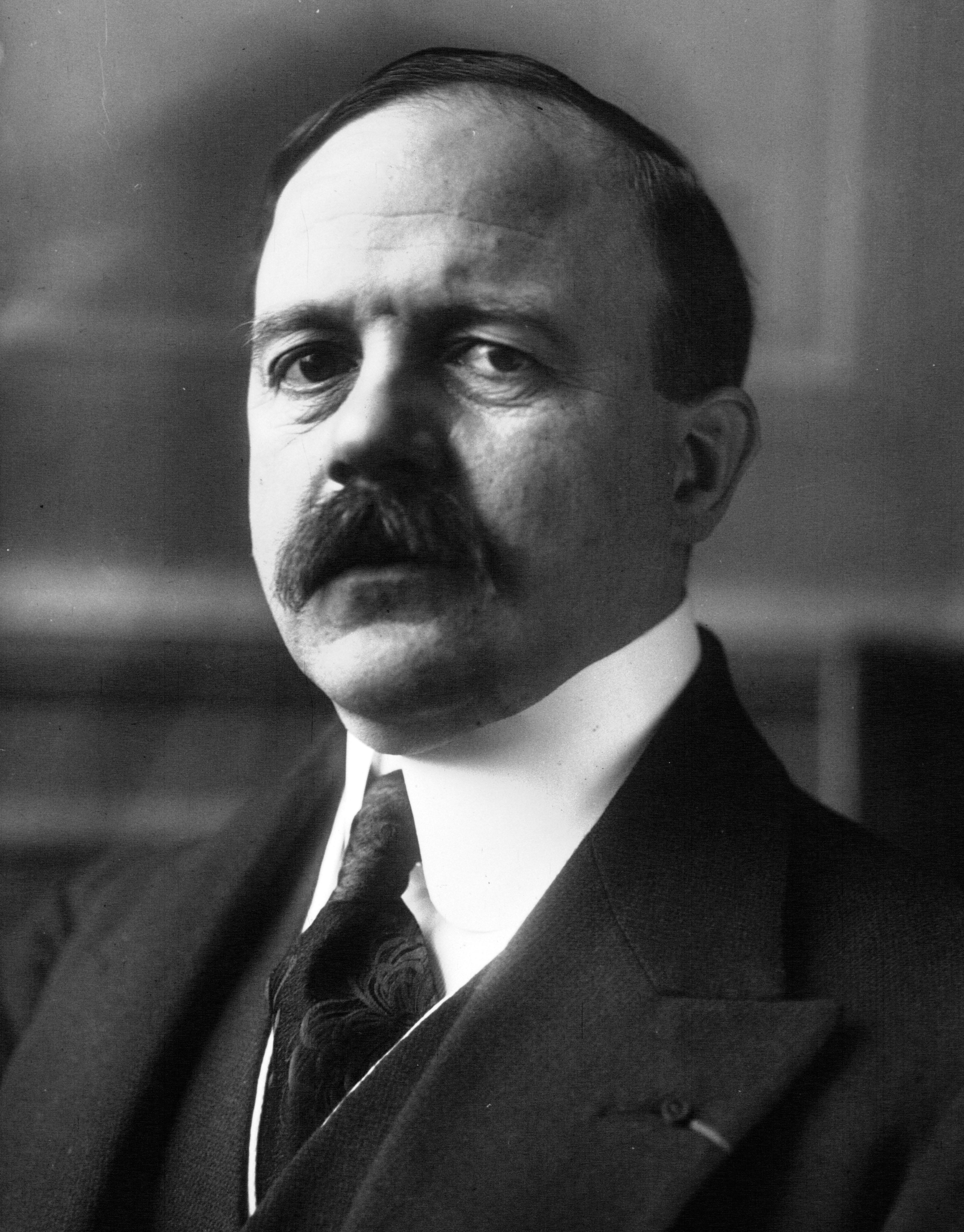
François-Marsal, Prime Minister for a week

- Frédéric François-Marsal formed a cabinet as the new Prime Minister of France but would serve for only seven days before his government collapsed.
- The American team of aviators who were attempting to become the first people to fly around the world reached Hong Kong. The team would arrive in Saigon on June 16, followed by Bangkok and Rangoon, and Calcutta by June 26.
- Born: Kenneth Waltz, American political scientist, author of Theory of International Politics; in Ann Arbor, Michigan (d. 2013)

== June 9, 1924 (Monday) ==
- The two unbeaten teams of the Olympic soccer football championship, Uruguay (4 wins, no draws or losses) and Switzerland (3 wins, 1 draw, no losses) played before 40,522 fans at the Olympic Stadium in Colombes. Uruguay won, 3 to 0 for the championship and the gold medal.
- Ecuador became the first nation in South America to extend the right to vote to women, after the lobbying of Dr. Matilde Hidalgo, as the Council of State of Ecuador ruled that Ecuadorian women enjoyed the right to elect and be elected ("Las mujeres ecuatorianas gozaban del derecho de elegir y ser elegidas.")
- 1. F.C. Nuremberg beat Hamburger SV, 2 to 0, to win the German football championship.
- Born:
  - John Scott, New Zealand architect; in Haumoana (d. 1992)
  - Dwaram Bhavanarayana Rao, Indian violinist; in Bapatla, (now in Andhra Pradesh) (d. 2020)
- Died:
  - Frederick Burlingham, 47, American world traveler and film documentary producer known for his series of silent film travelogues, died of a heart attack at his home.
  - Peter Clark MacFarlane, 53, American novelist, committed suicide by a gunshot wound to the head.

== June 10, 1924 (Tuesday) ==
- Giacomo Matteotti, a socialist member of the Italian Chamber of Deputies and one of Benito Mussolini's most outspoken critics, was kidnapped in broad daylight. On May 30, he had spoken out against Prime Minister Mussolini and the Fascist movement in general. His fate would be a mystery until his body was found in August, with signs that he had been beaten to death. Six men were arrested for the crime, including Amerigo Dumini, who would confess a week later. Mussolini said he would order summary justice if any of the kidnappers were identified.
- The Anglo-Iraqi Treaty of 1922, making Iraq a self-governing British protectorate, was ratified by the Iraqi Constituent Assembly by a vote of 36 to 25, with the United Kingdom having control of Iraq's foreign affairs and Iraq handling its own domestic affairs.
- The June Revolution was completed in Albania when anti-government forces took the Albanian capital, Tirana.
- The Republican National Convention opened in Cleveland, Ohio.
- Died: General Salvador Alvarado, 43, former Mexican Treasury Secretary and Governor of Yucatán, later an anti-government rebel, was killed by agents of Mexico's President Obregon.

== June 11, 1924 (Wednesday) ==
- Alexandre Millerand, President of France since 1920, resigned after the triumph of the Cartel des Gauches candidates in the May elections for the Chamber of Deputies.
- Comedian and actor Frank Tinney was held to the grand jury on $25,000 bail over the assault charge brought by Imogene Wilson. Tinney denied ever striking her and made jokes on the witness stand despite admonitions from the bench.
- Born:
  - Adib Boroumand, Iranian poet and politician; in Gaz-e Borkhar (d. 2017)
  - General Akhtar Abdur Rahman, Chief of Staff of the Pakistan Armed Forces from 1987 until his death in 1988 in the assassination of President Muhammad Zia-ul-Haq; in Peshawar, North-West Frontier Province, British India (d.1988)
- Died: Théodore Dubois, 86, French composer and music teacher

== June 12, 1924 (Thursday) ==
- The largest train robbery in American history, based on adjusted value of the money taken, took place as the Newton Gang carried out the robbery of the express mail train number 57 of the Milwaukee Road (the Chicago, Milwaukee and St. Paul Railroad) near Rondout, Illinois. The train was stopped by the robbers while it was carrying out its "Fast Mail" service. The amount of cash and bonds taken was more than three million dollars (similar to $54.3 million in 2024).
- Asphyxiation killed 44 crewmen aboard the USS Mississippi off San Pedro, when the battleship's Number Two main battery turret exploded and filled the interior with smoke from a fire. A few minutes later, four rescuers were killed when the fire caused gunpowder in another cannon to explode. The explosion was, at the time, the deadliest peacetime disaster in U.S. Navy history.
- On the last day of the Republican National Convention, U.S. President Calvin Coolidge was formally nominated as the Republican candidate for the 1924 U.S. presidential election, receiving the votes of all but 44 delegates. Robert M. La Follette of Wisconsin received 44 votes of delegates from Wisconsin and North Dakota, and Hiram Johnson of California got 10 delegate votes from South Dakota. Charles G. Dawes won the Republican nomination for vice president to be Coolidge's running mate.

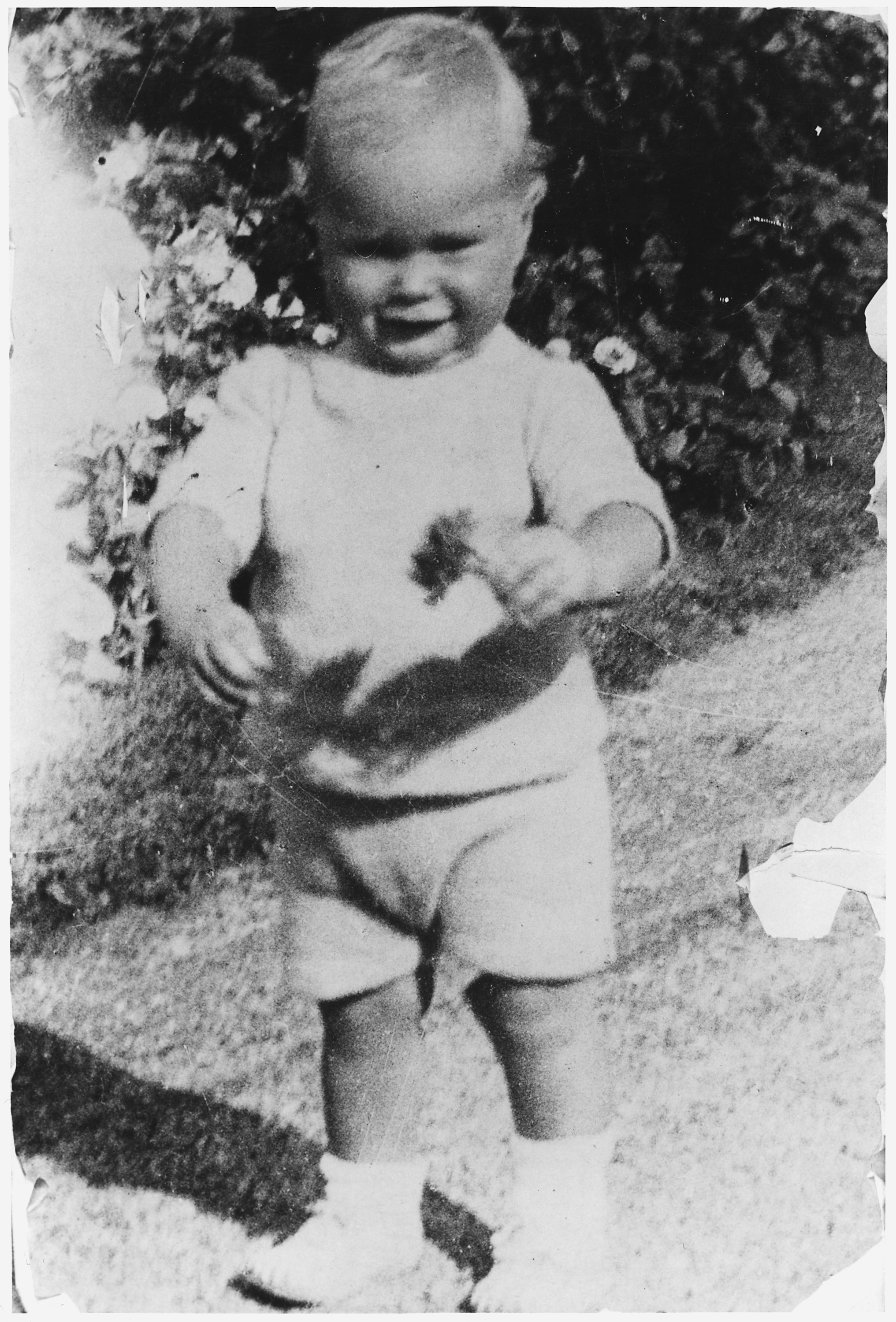
Future president Bush in 1925

- Born: George H. W. Bush, 41st President of the United States (from 1989 to 1991) was born at 173 Adams Street in Milton, Massachusetts (d. 2018)
- Died: Frederic Lister Burk, 61, Canadian-born U.S. educator who was the founder and president of San Francisco State University.

== June 13, 1924 (Friday) ==
- Gaston Doumergue was sworn in as the 13th President of France, succeeding Alexandre Millerand.
- U.S. Army Lieutenant John A. Macready became the first airplane pilot to bail out of a stricken aircraft at night successfully. Macready was approaching McCook Field at Dayton, Ohio, when the engine died. Unable to see a site for an emergency landing, Macready parachuted from his plane and was able to survive after landing in a tree.
- The oratorio Le Laudi, written by Swiss composer Hermann Suter, was performed for the first time, premiering at Basel to celebrate the 100th anniversary of the Basel Choral Society.
- Born:
  - Gemini Shankaran (stage name for Moorkkoth Vengakkandi Sankaran), Indian circus performer and owner; in Kolassery, Madras Province, British India (now Kerala state (d. 2023)
  - Barbara Ball, white Bermudan physician and civil rights activist on behalf of black Bermudans; in St. George's (d. 2011)
  - Major General Tajammul Hussain Malik, Pakistan Army officer who attempted two coups d'état against the Pakistani government in 1977 and 1980; in Chakwal District, Punjab Province, British India (now Punjab province in Pakistan (d. 2003)

== June 14, 1924 (Saturday) ==
- The International Football Association Board legalized the scoring of a goal by corner kick in advance of the 1924 Summer Olympics competition. The first score by corner kick in international play would be made on October 2, 1924, by Cesáreo Onzari of the Argentina national football team in 2 to 1 win over the Olympic champion Uruguay, and the goal was called "an Olympico" as a result.
- Aldo Finzi resigned as Italy's Under Secretary of State over the Matteotti disappearance, explaining he was doing so in order to defend himself from "libelous accusations" spread against him by the opposition. Rome's Chief of Police, Emilio De Bono, resigned three days later.
- The Sea Hawk, the most popular film of 1924, starring Milton Sills and Enid Bennett, premiered in New York City before being released to theaters on June 14.
- Born:
  - Sir James Black, Scottish pharmacologist and 1988 Nobel Prize laureate; in Uddingston, Lanarkshire (d. 2010)
  - Arthur Erickson, Canadian architect; in Vancouver (d.2009)
  - Yaakov Rechter, Israeli architect; in Tel Aviv (d.2001)
- Died:
  - Frank Bunker Gilbreth, 55, American efficiency expert and occupational engineer, died of a heart attack while talking to his wife by telephone. Gilbreth would become best known as the central figure in the bestselling book and popular film Cheaper by the Dozen.
  - Joseph Henry Kibbey, 71, American politician and jurist, Territorial Governor of Arizona 1905 to 1909

== June 15, 1924 (Sunday) ==
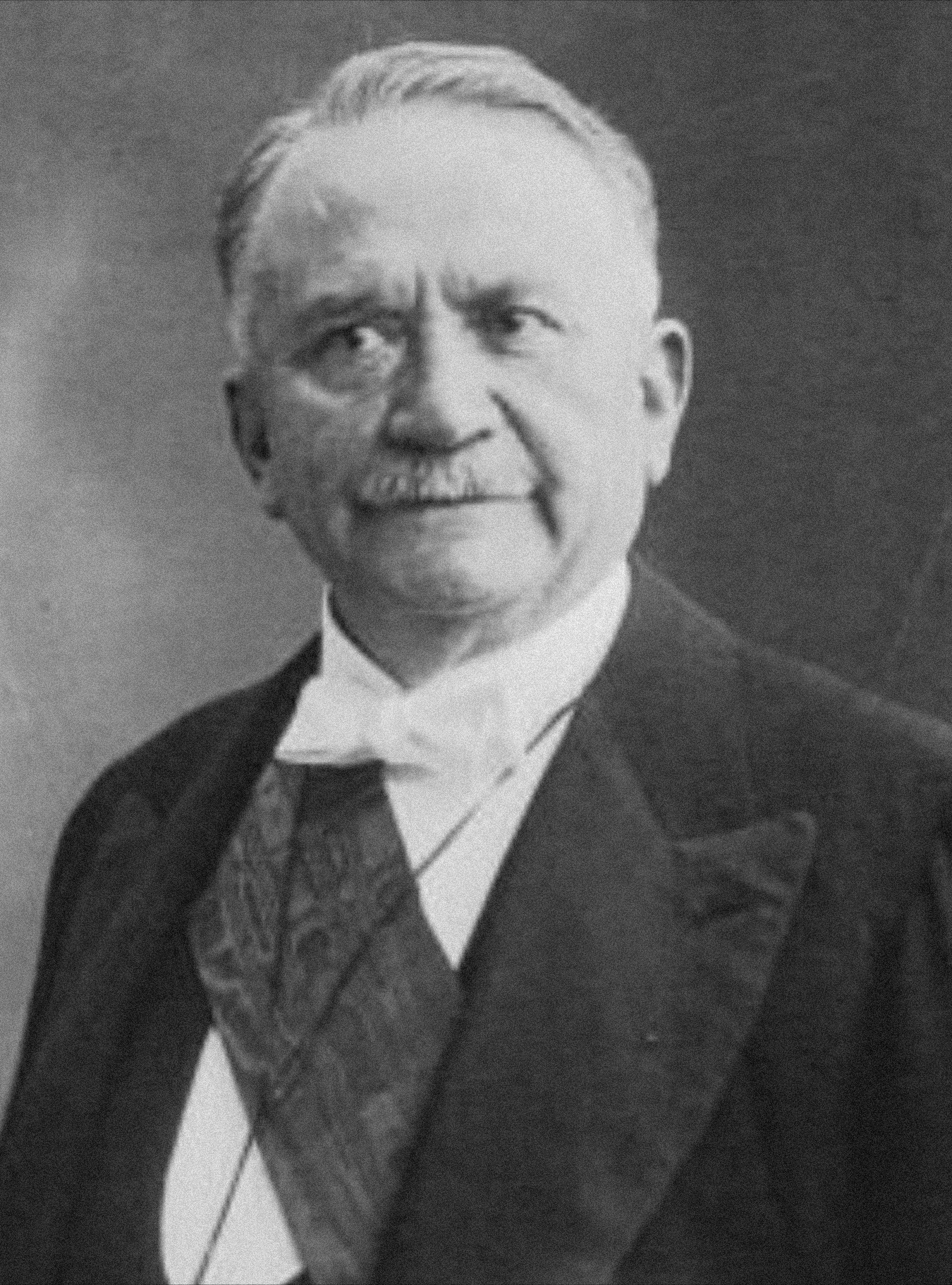
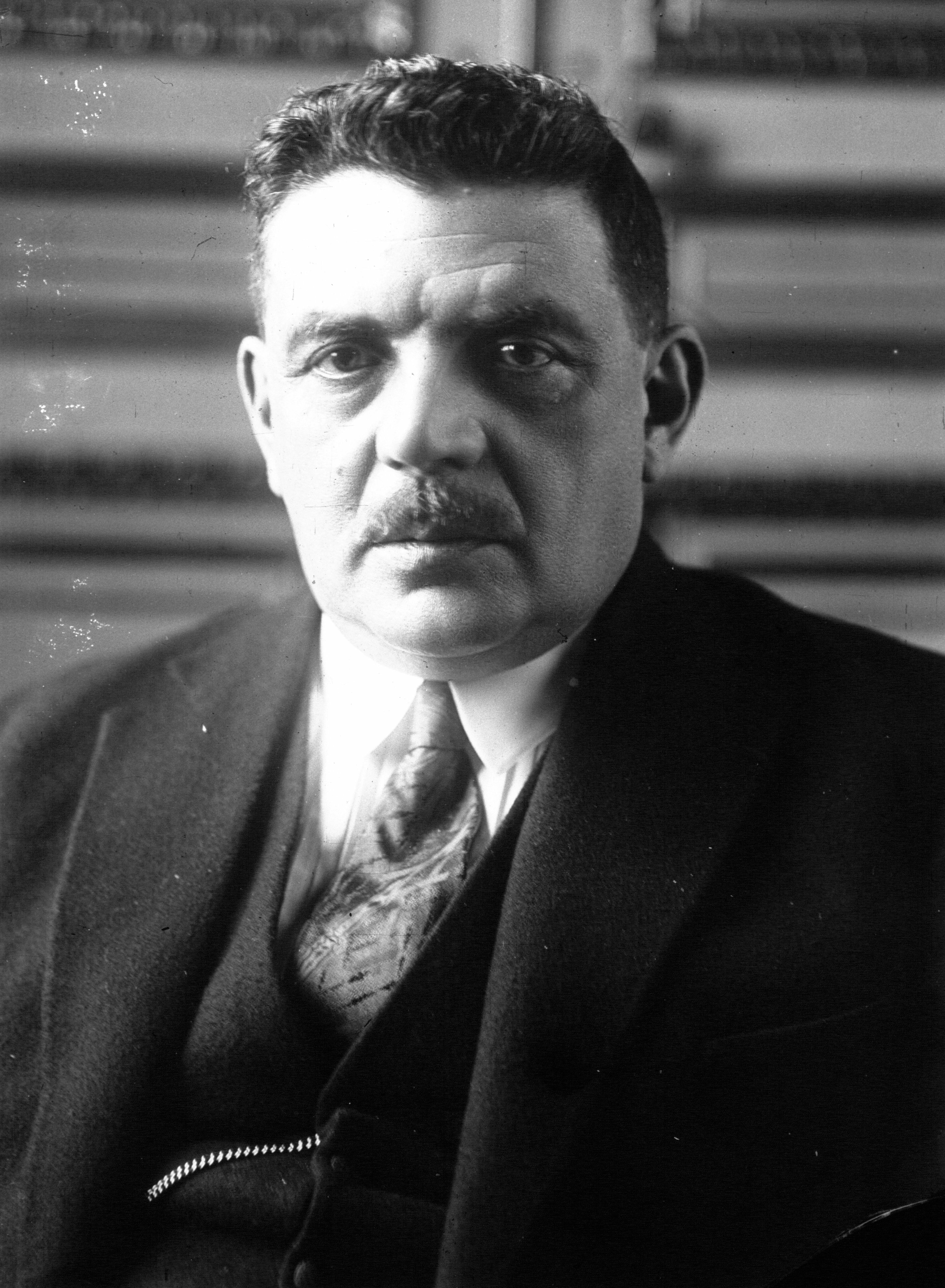
President Gaston Doumergue of France and Prime Minister Édouard Herriot
- Édouard Herriot became Prime Minister of France.
- The ballet Mercure, choreographed by Léonide Massine, with decor and costumes by Pablo Picasso and music by Erik Satie, was performed for the first time, premiering at the Théâtre de la Cigale in Paris.
- Born: Ezer Weizman, President of Israel from 1993 to 2000; in Tel Aviv (d. 2005).
- Died: Bill Brennan, 30, American boxer, was shot and killed outside the Tia Juana Tavern that he owned in New York City, after ejecting two mobsters from his establishment.

== June 16, 1924 (Monday) ==
- The Lone Scouts of America, founded in 1915 by newspaper publisher W. D Boyce as a rural version of the Boy Scouts, merged with the Boy Scouts of America and discontinued operations.
- Fan Noli (Theofan Stilian Noli), one of the leaders of Albania's June Revolution, formed a government of ministers with himself as Prime Minister of Albania.
- King Victor Emmanuel III of Italy held an extraordinary council with former Prime Ministers and members of the royal family to discuss the Matteotti crisis as Mussolini's hold on power appeared increasingly tenuous. Italian Fascist politician Cesare Rossi surrendered to police the same day after having been in hiding.
- The much-delayed trial of Mabel Normand's chauffeur, over the New Year's Day shooting of millionaire Courtland S. Dines, opened in Los Angeles. Edna Purviance once again testified that she was out of the room when the shooting happened.
- Born: Faith Domergue, American film and TV actress; in New Orleans (d. 1999)

== June 17, 1924 (Tuesday) ==
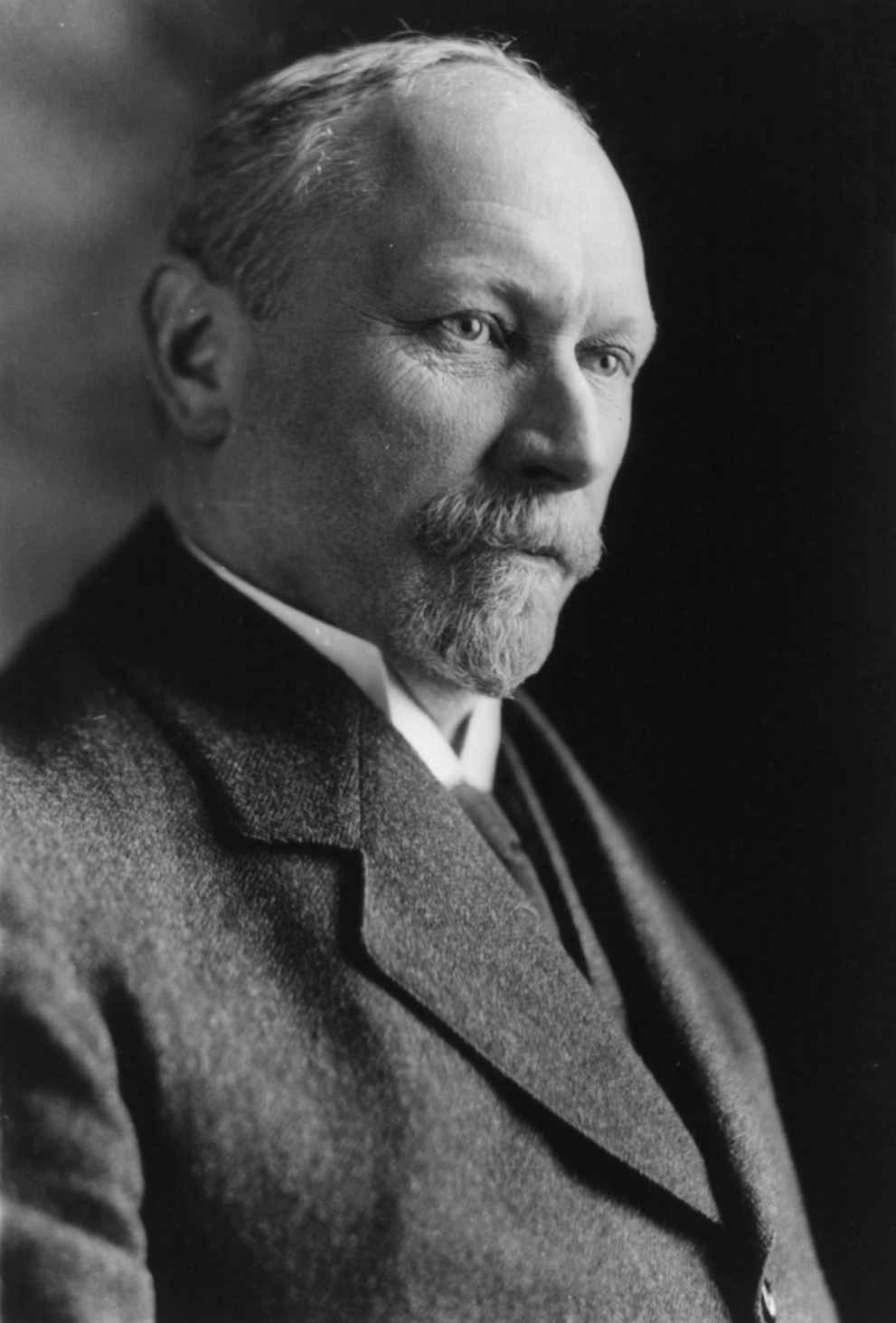
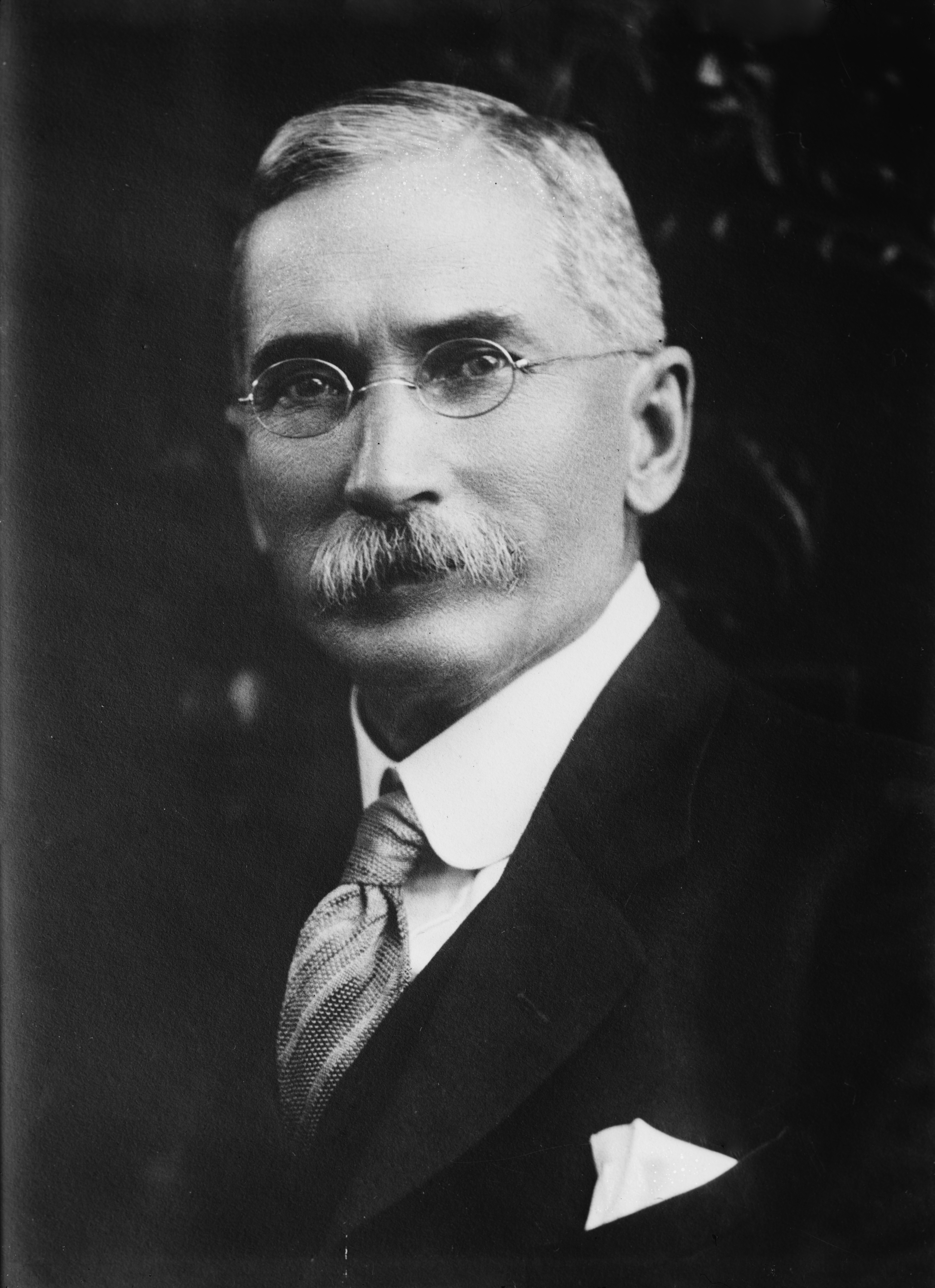
Outgoing South African premier Smuts, and new premier Hertzog
- Voting was held in South Africa for the 135 seats of the House of Assembly. The ruling South African Party, led by Prime Minister Jan Smuts, lost 24 of its 77 seats, while the National Party of J. B. M. Hertzog gained 19 seats for 63 overall, five short of a majority.
- Born: Charlotte Armstrong, American baseball pitcher for the All-American Girls Professional Baseball League (AAGPBL) and for the lesser-known rival National Girls Baseball League; in Dallas, Texas (d. 2008)

== June 18, 1924 (Wednesday) ==
- The United Kingdom broke off its relations with Mexico over the treatment of diplomatic agent H.C. Cummins.
- Denmark formally recognized the Soviet Union.
- Born:
  - George Mikan, American basketball star; in Joliet, Illinois (d. 2005)
  - Efren Reyes Sr., Filipino film actor and director known for playing the title role in Pedro Penduko; in Manila (d. 1968)

== June 19, 1924 (Thursday) ==
- A postal strike began in Canada.
- Finnish athlete Paavo Nurmi broke two world records on the same day at a meet at Eläintarha Stadium in Helsinki, running the 1500 meters in 3 minutes, 52.6 seconds, and later winning the 5000 meters in 14 minutes, 28.2 seconds.
- Italian fascist Giovanni Marinelli, was arrested in relation to the Matteoti Crisis.
- Mabel Normand's chauffeur was acquitted on the assault charge from the New Year's Day shooting, though he was immediately re-arrested on a separate liquor charge. Despite the acquittal, the scandal was too much for Normand's film career after the William Desmond Taylor murder and she was effectively finished as a Hollywood star.

== June 20, 1924 (Friday) ==
- Sir Francis Younghusband of the Royal Geographical Society sent a telegram informing the media that George Mallory and A.C. Irvine had died attempting to climb Mount Everest.
- The ballet Le Train Bleu, choreographed by Bronislava Nijinska, with music by Darius Milhaud, was performed for the first time, premiering in Paris at the Théâtre des Champs-Élysées.
- Steve Sullivan won the world junior lightweight boxing title by defeating titleholder Johnny Dundee in a bout at Brooklyn.
- Born:
  - Chester "Chet" Atkins, guitarist and record producer; in Luttrell, Tennessee (d. 2001)
  - Bill Malone (stage name for William Malone Polglase), American game show host known for Supermarket Sweep; in Brooklyn (killed in car accident, 1973)
- Died: Charles "Chick" Morrison, 46, American silent film actor, was killed at the Hal Roach Studios by his horse, "Spec", a wild horse whom he was training for a film.

== June 21, 1924 (Saturday) ==
- The South American nations of Peru and Ecuador reached an agreement on their disputed border in the Ponce-Castro Oyanguern Protocol", agreeing to U.S. arbitration if they were unable to reach any points on the division of Tacna and Arica.
- In advance of the Democratic National Convention in the U.S., Governor Al Smith of New York "spoke for six minutes via Phonofilm, three years before the first motion picture with sound, to the delegates of the New York Democratic Convention.
- Born:
  - Ezzatolah Entezami, Iranian actor; in Tehran (d. 2018)
  - Wally Fawkes (pen name for Walter Pearsall), Canadian-born British cartoonist who signed his work with the name "Trog"; in Vancouver (d. 2023)

== June 22, 1924 (Sunday) ==
- Britain and France agreed to hold a conference in London starting in mid-July to discuss implementation of the Dawes Plan.
- Died: Judson Whitlocke Lyons, 65, African-American attorney who served as the highest-ranked black federal government official during the administrations of Presidents McKinley and Roosevelt as the Register of the Treasury, 1898 to 1906

== June 23, 1924 (Monday) ==
- U.S. Army First Lieutenant Russell Maughan successfully made the first dawn-to-dusk transcontinental flight across the United States, landing at Crissy Field in San Francisco at 9:46 in the evening local time, one minute before sundown, after having departed earlier on the same day from Mitchel Field on Long Island near Garden City, New York at 3:58 in the morning local time. During his flight of 20 hours and 48 minutes, in a Curtiss P-1 Hawk, he made refueling stops at Dayton, Ohio; St. Joseph, Missouri; North Platte, Nebraska; Cheyenne, Wyoming and the Bonneville Salt Flats at Salduro, Utah before completing a journey of 2,670 miles (4,300 km).
- German serial killer Fritz Haarmann, called the Butcher of Hanover, was arrested eight days after murdering and dismembering his final victim, Erich de Vries, after he was seen stalking boys at the Central Station. A search of his apartment turned up bloodstains and possessions of victims as one of the most notorious serial killers in German history was revealed. Haarmann was implicated by another teenager who had been arrested at Hanover station the night before.

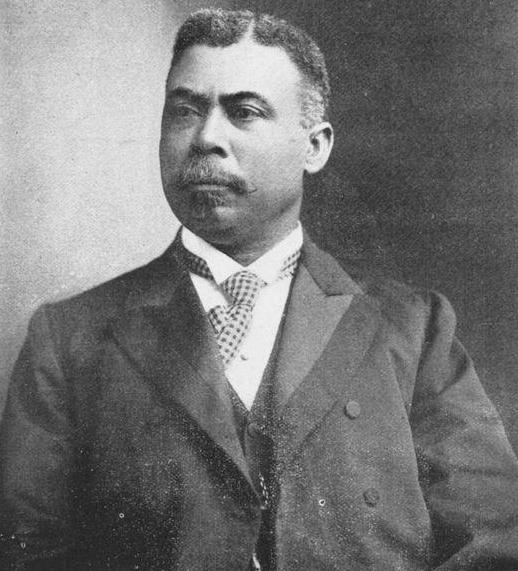
U.S. Treasury Register Lyons

- Born: Ranasinghe Premadasa, President of Sri Lanka from 1989 until his assassination in 1993, and Prime Minister from 1978 to 1989; in Colombo, British Ceylon

== June 24, 1924 (Tuesday) ==
- Attorney General Hugh Kennedy took office as the first Chief Justice of Ireland, presiding over the Supreme Court of the Irish Free State.
- The Democratic National Convention opened at Madison Square Garden in New York City. Former Treasury Secretary William Gibbs McAdoo was considered the front-runner going into the convention, but required two-thirds of the 1,092 delegate votes for a majority. The convention would last 16 days before a nominee would be picked on July 9.
- The brand name for Kleenex, which would become synonymous with facial tissue, was used for the first time in commerce, according to an application for registered trademark filed with the U.S. Patent and Trademark Office (USPTO) by the original manufacturer, the Cellucotton Products Company of Neenah, Wisconsin.
- The Italian Senate held a ceremony commemorating Giacomo Matteotti, now presumed dead. Benito Mussolini promised to reform his government and then put it to a vote of confidence the last week of July, but said that the Fascists did not need to be removed from power over the crisis.
- The New York Daily Mirror was launched by publisher William Randolph Hearst as a morning paper in New York City, to compete against the popular New York Daily News. Hearst, who already owned the morning New York American and the New York Evening Journal, would sell the Daily Mirror in 1928 and then buy it back in 1932; the paper would continue publication until October 16, 1963.
- Born:
  - Brian Bevan, Australian rugby league footballer, and the only player ever to have been inducted into both the Australian Rugby League Hall of Fame and British Rugby League Hall of Fame; in Sydney (d. 1991)
  - Estela Quesada, Costa Rican politician and the first woman to serve as a cabinet minister in the Central American nation; in Alajuela (d. 2001)
  - László Fuchs, Hungarian-born American mathematician; in Budapest. (alive in 2026)

== June 25, 1924 (Wednesday) ==
- Frank B. Kellogg was appointed as the U.S. delegate for next month's London conference.
- Francisco Santiago's Piano Concerto in B-flat minor was performed for the first time, premiering in Chicago.
- Born:
  - Sidney Lumet, American film director, producer and screenwriter; in Philadelphia (d. 2011)
  - Deng Jiaxian (Chia Hsien Teng), Chinese nuclear physicist who led the development of atomic and hydrogen nuclear weapons for the People's Republic of China; in Huaining, Anhui province (d. 1986) (simplified Chinese: 邓稼先; traditional Chinese: 鄧稼先; pinyin: Dèng Jiàxiān; Wade–Giles: Teng Chia-Hsien
- Died: Antonia García de Videgain, 74, Spanish opera singer and actress

== June 26, 1924 (Thursday) ==
- Jesse Barnes of the Boston Braves opposed Virgil Barnes of the New York Giants in the first brother vs. brother pitching matchup in major league baseball history. Jesse took the loss and Virgil a no-decision as the Giants won, 8 to 1.
- The United States and Bulgaria exchanged ratifications of an extradition treaty.
- Born:
  - Jørgen Læssøe, Danish archaeologist of Assyrian history; in Jægerspris (d. 1993)
  - Hector Catling, British archaeologist (d. 2013)
  - John Strohmeyer, American journalist and 1972 Pulitzer Prize winner; in Boston (d. 2010)

== June 27, 1924 (Friday) ==
- The "Aventine Secession" took place as 123 members of the opposition in the Italian Chamber of Deputies walked out of the Chamber, retreated to Aventine Hill and gave Premier Benito Mussolini an ultimatum. The Deputies demanded an acknowledgment of government responsibility for Fascist crimes, a complete and thorough investigation of the Matteotti affair and the abolition of the Blackshirts. If the government did not accede, the ultimatum read, the opposition would stage a boycott of parliament. On the same day, 10 minutes of silence were observed all over Italy in respect for Giacomo Matteotti. Ultimately, the strategy of the 123 legislators would backfire and they would be declared on November 9, 1926, to have forfeited their seats, clearing the way legally for Italy to become a one-party state under Fascist control.
- American golfer Walter Hagen won the British Open.
- Born: Bob Appleyard, English cricketer (d. 2015)

== June 28, 1924 (Saturday) ==
- A tornado killed 85 people in the U.S. state of Ohio, 72 of them in Lorain, Ohio (including 15 inside a theater and eight inside a bath house on Lake Erie), after starting off the coast of Sandusky, where it killed eight people.
- At the Democratic National Convention, a plank calling for participation in the League of Nations was soundly rejected by a margin of 742½ to 353½. A plank denouncing the Ku Klux Klan by name was also narrowly rejected.
- Born: Pushpa Lal Shrestha, Nepalese Communist leader; in Ramechhap (d. 1978)

== June 29, 1924 (Sunday) ==
- Canada's postal strike ended.
- Studded leather collars were reported as the latest fad in women's fashion in Paris.
- Born:
  - Ezra Laderman, American composer, in Brooklyn (d. 2015)
  - Flo Sandon's (stage name for Mammola Sandon), Italian singer; in Vicenza (d. 2006)
  - Irene Pollin, American sports executive and philanthropist; as Irene Sue Kerchek in St. Louis. (d. 2020)

== June 30, 1924 (Monday) ==
- Mexico's President Álvaro Obregón announced that he was suspending further payments from the Mexican Treasury to the International Committee of Bankers on Mexico (ICBM), abrogating the De la Huerta–Lamont Treaty that had been signed on June 16, 1922. Mexico had paid $16,250,000 to the ICBM Bankers in 1922 and 1923.
- After the first day of balloting and 15 rounds of voting, and no candidate receiving the necessary 729 votes for a two-thirds majority, the Democratic National Convention adjourned at midnight. William Gibbs McAdoo (with 479 votes) and Al Smith (with 305.5) were deadlocked in balloting. On the first ballot, McAdoo had 431.5 and Smith 241, with the eventual nominee in seventh place with 31.
- J. B. M. Hertzog took office as the new Prime Minister of South Africa.
- Sixteen-year-old Calvin Coolidge Jr. played a tennis match on the White House tennis court wearing tennis shoes but no socks. During the course of the match he developed a toe blister that would lead to fatal blood poisoning.
- Dutch-born Jewish poet Jacob Israël de Haan was assassinated in Jerusalem by the Avraham Tehomi on the orders of Haganah leader Yitzhak Ben-Zvi for his anti-Zionist activity and contacts with Arab leaders. Tehomi waited outside the synagogue at the Shaare Zedek Hospital for De Haan, then shot him three times.
- Born:
  - Amos Horev, Israeli military official who was commander of the Palmach, the underground fighting force of the Zionist terrorist group Haganah; in Jerusalem, British Mandate of Palestine (alive in 2026)
  - Elga Ruth Wasserman, American educator and lawyer who guided the transformation of Yale University's undergraduate college from an all-male institution to the 1969 admission of women as students for the first time. (d. 2014)
- Died: Praskovya Uvarova, 84, Russian archaeologist
