= May 1924 =

Month of 1924

<<	May 1924					>>
Su	Mo	Tu	We	Th	Fr	Sa
				1	2	3
4	5	6	7	8	9	10
11	12	13	14	15	16	17
18	19	20	21	22	23	24
25	26	27	28	29	30	31

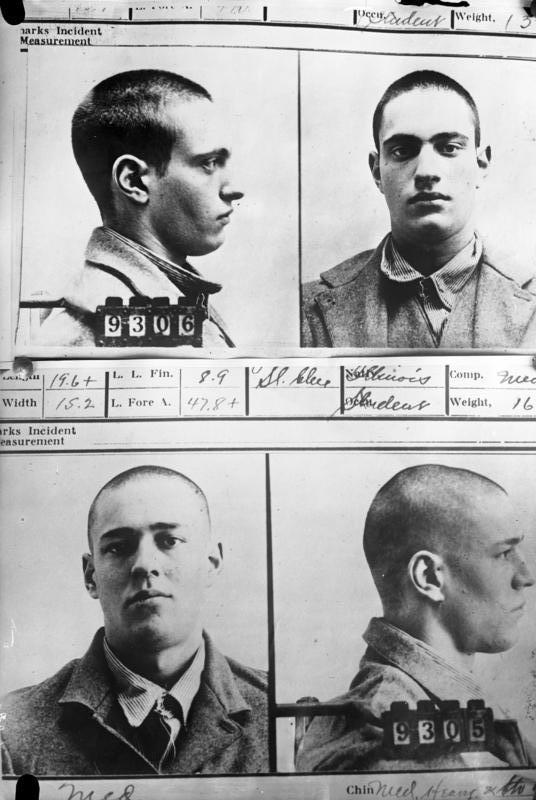
May 21, 1924: Thrill-killers Nathan Leopold and Richard Loeb kidnap and murder 14-year old Bobby Franks

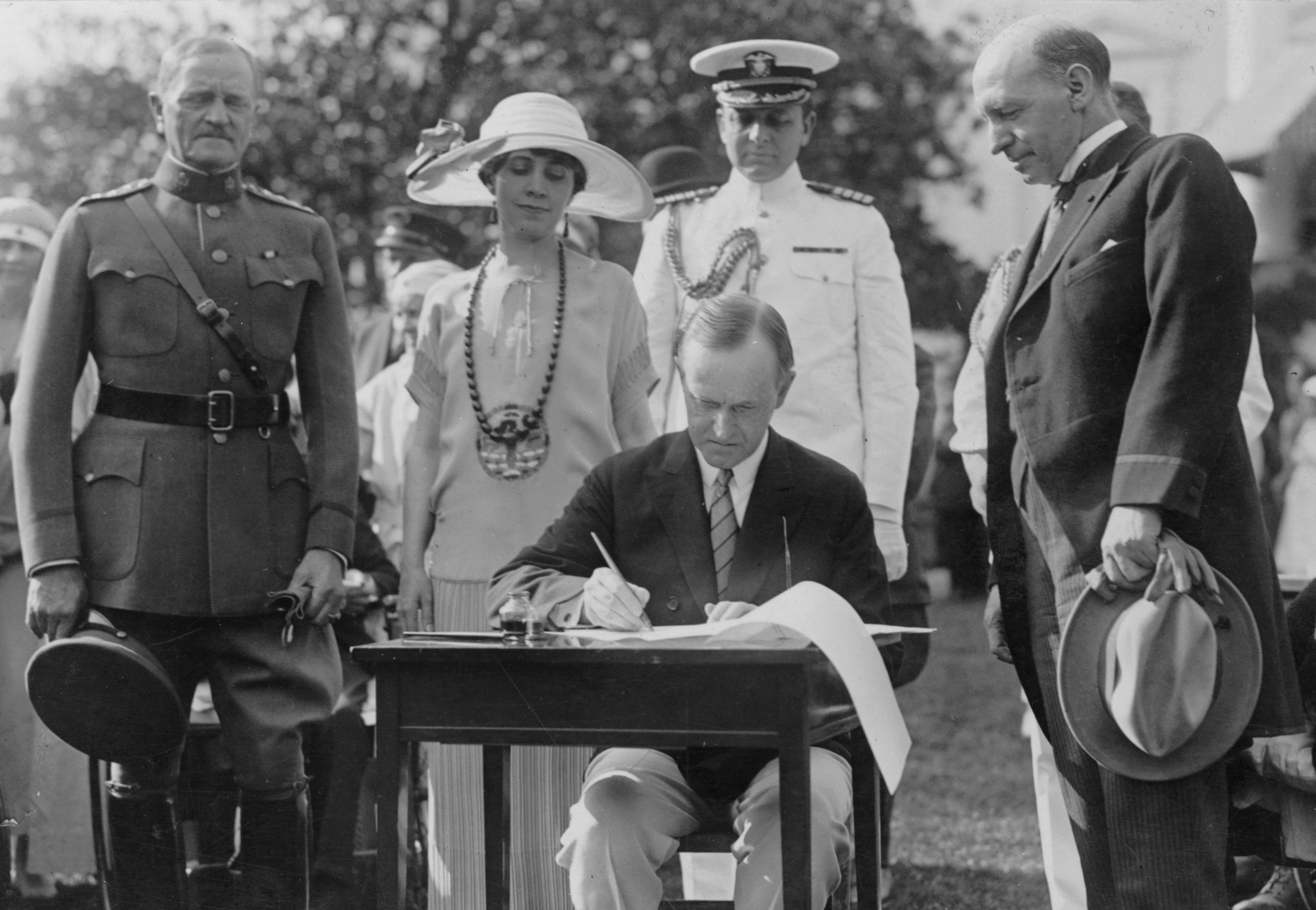
May 26, 1924: U.S. President Coolidge signs discriminatory Immigration Act of 1924 into law

The following events occurred in May 1924:

== May 1, 1924 (Thursday) ==
- Iodized salt, now used in table salt worldwide, was introduced in the United States after Canadian-born pediatrician David Murray Cowie became aware that the Swiss addition of sodium iodide or potassium iodide to salt could safely remedy the problem of iodine deficiency that was a leading cause of thyroid problems. With problems including related goiters prevalent in Michigan, Dr. Cowie was able to persuade several saltmakers (Diamond Crystal Salt, Mulkey Salt, Inland Delray Salt, Michigan Salt Works, and Ruggles and Rademaker) to use the Swiss process and distribute the product, starting in Michigan grocery stores.
- Two German automobile manufacturers, Benz und Companie (founded by Carl Benz) and Daimler Motoren Gesellschaft (founded by Gottlieb Daimler and Wilhelm Maybach) signed an Agreement of Mutual Interest to combine operations, which would result in their 1926 merger into Daimler-Benz, manufacturers of the Mercedes-Benz automobile.
- The German military suppressed attempts to hold May Day demonstrations all over the country. Eight people died and hundreds were wounded.
- The Whampoa Military Academy, which would later become the military academy for the Republic of China in Taiwan, officially opened at Guangzhou in China.
- Chinese premier Sun Yat-sen delivered the opening address at ceremonies at Changzhou Island.
- Born:
  - Grégoire Kayibanda, the first President of Rwanda (from 1962 to 1973); in Tare, Belgian territory of Ruanda-Urundi (killed, 1976)
  - Art Fleming (stage name for Arthur Fleming Fazzin), American TV actor, newscaster and television game show host known for the original version of the Jeopardy!; in New York City (d. 2005)
  - Big Maybelle (stage name for Mabel Smith), American rhythm and blues singer, posthumous inductee into the Grammy Hall of Fame; in Jackson, Tennessee (d. 1972)
  - Terry Southern, American screenwriter and novelist; in Alvarado, Texas (d. 1995)
  - Enriko Josif, Yugoslavian Serbian composer; in Belgrade, Yugoslavia (d. 2003)

== May 2, 1924 (Friday) ==
- The Craters of the Moon National Monument, located in the U.S. state of Idaho near the town of Arco, was designated for federal protection.
- U.S. president Calvin Coolidge issued an arms embargo on Cuba at the request of its government.
- Born:
  - Jamal Abro, Pakistani writer; in Mehar Tehsil, Bombay Province, British India (now Pakistan) (d. 2004)
  - Lynn Evans Mand (stage name for Carolyn Hartgate), American pop music singer for The Chordettes, known for "Mr. Sandman" and "Lollipop"; in Youngstown, Ohio (d. 2020)

== May 3, 1924 (Saturday) ==
- In the closest finish ever for the championship of English football, Huddersfield Town A.F.C., with a record of 22 wins and 11 draws, defeated Nottingham Forest F.C., 3 to 0, while Cardiff City F.C. of Wales, with a record of 22 wins and 12 draws, played to a scoreless draw against Birmingham City F.C., leaving both with the same record of 57 points (23-11 for Huddersfield, 22-13 for Cardiff, based on two points for a win and one point for each draw), to finish in first place in the English League's First Division. Under the English League rules, the tiebreaker for identical records was based on the ratio of goals scored divided by goals allowed, and Huddersfield's 60/33 ratio of 1.818 was slightly higher than Cardiff's 61/34 ratio of 1.794. If Huddersfield had scored only 2 goals in its final game, a ratio of 59/33 would have been 1.7878 for second place.
- The Jewish fraternity Aleph Zadik Aleph was formed in Omaha, Nebraska. It would in turn form the B'nai B'rith Youth Organization (BBYO) a year later.
- The steamship SS Catalina, known as "The Great White Steamer", and for making thousands of trips between Los Angeles and Santa Catalina Island in the U.S. state of California, was launched for the first time. Over the next 51 years, it would transport as many as 2,000 passengers at a time on the 2½ hour and 26 miles (42 km) trip to and from Santa Catalina, carrying 25 million people over the years, more passengers than any other vessel anywhere in the world, according to the Steamship Historical Society of America.
- In Argentina, 150,000 workers participated in a general strike protesting the mandatory deduction of 5% of their wages for a fund for old-age pensions.
- The "Bozenhardt incident" occurred in Berlin when German police raided the Soviet Trade Delegation.
- Zinaida Kokorina, the first female military pilot in history, made her first solo flight.
- Born:
  - Isadore Singer, American mathematician known for index theory and the Atiyah–Singer index theorem which paved the way for new interactions between pure mathematics and theoretical physics, as well as the Kadison–Singer problem, the Ambrose–Singer holonomy theorem and the McKean–Singer theorem; in Detroit (d. 2021)
  - Jane Morgan (stage name for Florence Currier), American singer and actress; in Newton, Massachusetts (d. 2025)
- Died: Mykola Mikhnovsky, 50, Ukrainian nationalist, was found hanged outside the home of his longtime political ally, Volodymyr Shemet, after having been arrested and released by the Soviet secret police agency, the GPU.

== May 4, 1924 (Sunday) ==
- At least 50 Muslims were killed in the Iraqi city of Kirkuk by the British-sponsored Assyrian Levies paramilitary force.
- Elections were held in Germany for all 472 seats of the Reichstag. The Social Democratic Party of Germany narrowly maintained its small plurality of 100 seats, and the German National People's Party finished second with 95. Among the new Reichstag electees was Erich Ludendorff, who ran under the banner of the National Socialist Freedom Movement, a stand-in for the Nazi Party which was banned at the time.
- The Summer Olympics preliminary competitions began in Paris, with a 41 to 3 win by France's Olympic rugby league team over the Romanian team in front of 15,000 people at the Colombes Stadium, although the official opening ceremony would not be held until July 5.
- Soviet officials said the Bozenhardt incident would have serious consequences unless Germany apologized and paid reparations.
- Symphony No. 6 in E-flat minor, written by Russian composer Nikolai Myaskovsky, premiered at the Bolshoi Theatre in Moscow.
- Real Unión defeated Real Madrid, 1 to 0, to win the 24th Copa del Rey football championship.
- Born: Tatiana Nikolayeva, Soviet Russian pianist and composer; in Bezhitsa, Russian SFSR (d. 1993)
- Died: E. Nesbit (Edith Nesbit), 65, English author

== May 5, 1924 (Monday) ==
- The Pusan Public Industrial Continuation School, later the Busan National University of Technology, was established in Japanese-ruled Korea near Busan (at the time, Fuzan, Chōsen) in Bosu. It is now part of Pukyong National University.
- The Cuban rebellion spread to Oriente Province.
- Born: Betty Cooke, American jewelry designer; in Baltimore (d. 2024)
- Died:
  - Kate Claxton, 75, American stage actress, star of The Two Orphans on Broadway
  - Chattampi Swamikal, 70, Indian Hindu social reformer

== May 6, 1924 (Tuesday) ==
- The Soviet Union suspended trade with Germany as it had not received satisfaction over the Bozenhardt incident.
- Near Iași, Corneliu Zelea Codreanu opened the founding meeting of the new anti-Semitic Romanian organization, Frăția de Cruce ("Brotherhood of the Cross"). The meeting was invaded by Romania's national police, the Poliția Română, on orders of the local police chief, Constantin Manciu. Codreanu and his associates were severely beaten and tortured before they were released, and he made plans to take revenge on Manciu, whom he would assassinate five months later on October 24.
- Macedonian separatists presented the May Manifesto, an attempted declaration of independence.
- The Batley Bulldogs defeated the Wigan Warriors 13–7 to win the championship of the Northern Rugby Football League a predecessor to England's Rugby Football League.
- The strike in Argentina ended in victory for the workers.

== May 7, 1924 (Wednesday) ==
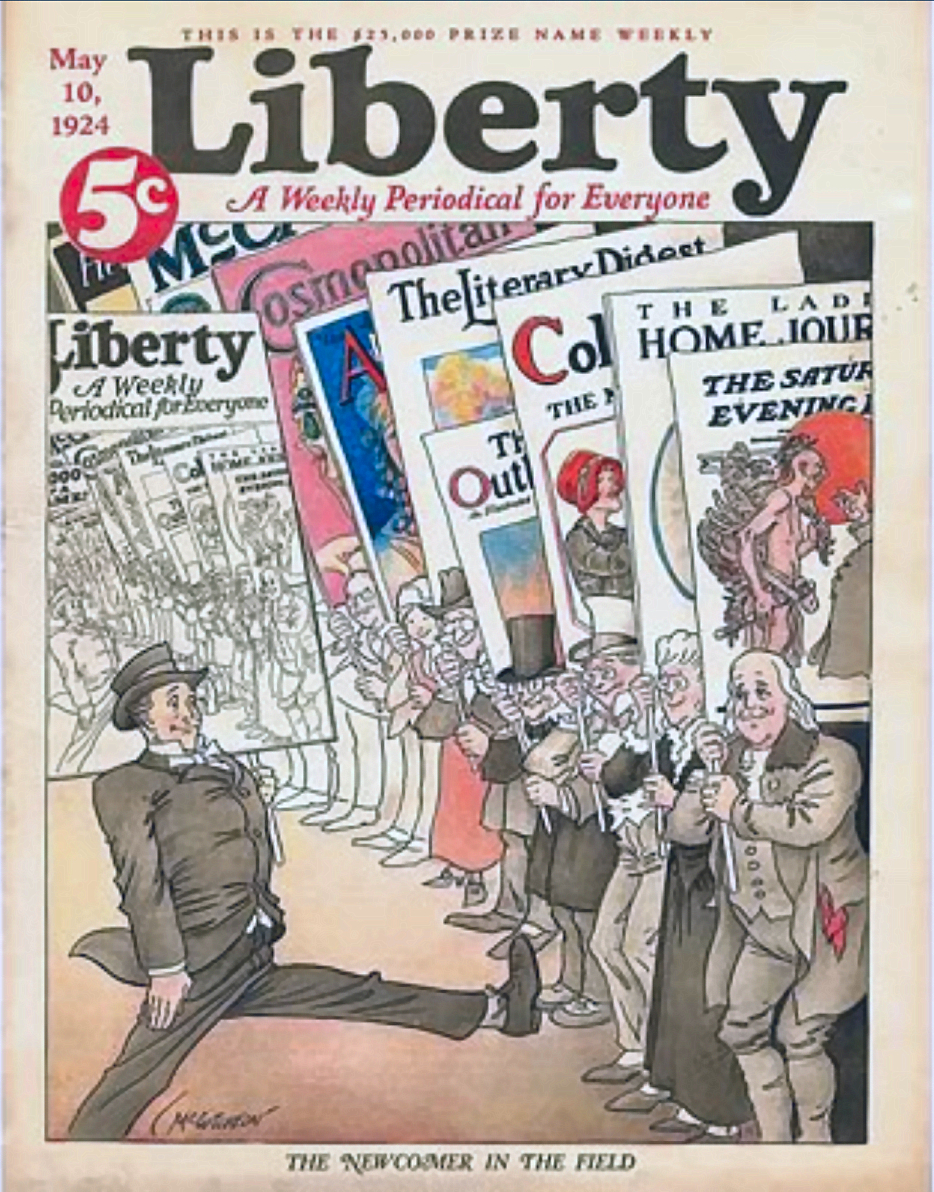

- The first issue of Liberty magazine, with a cover date of May 10, appeared on newsstands. The weekly general-interest magazine would decline in popularity, becoming a monthly magazine and ceasing publication in July 1950.
- The American Popular Revolutionary Alliance (Alianza Popular Revolucionaria Americana) was founded in Mexico City by Peruvian politician Víctor Raúl Haya de la Torre.
- In the Ruhr region of Germany, 300,000 miners went on strike over working hours.
- The Turkish daily newspaper Cumhuriyet, founded by Yunus Nadi Abalıoğlu, published its first issue.
- Died:
  - Dimitar Blagoev, 67, Bulgarian political leader
  - Alluri Sitarama Raju, 26, Indian independence activist, was executed by firing squad in the village of Koyyuru (now in the state of Andhra Pradesh by orders of the British Indian government.

== May 8, 1924 (Thursday) ==
- The Klaipėda Convention was signed in Paris between the government of Lithuania and representatives of the Conference of Ambassadors from the Allied powers of World War One, recognizing Lithuania's January 19 annexation of the Memel Territory between Germany and Lithuania, on condition that the annexed region would have limited autonomy.
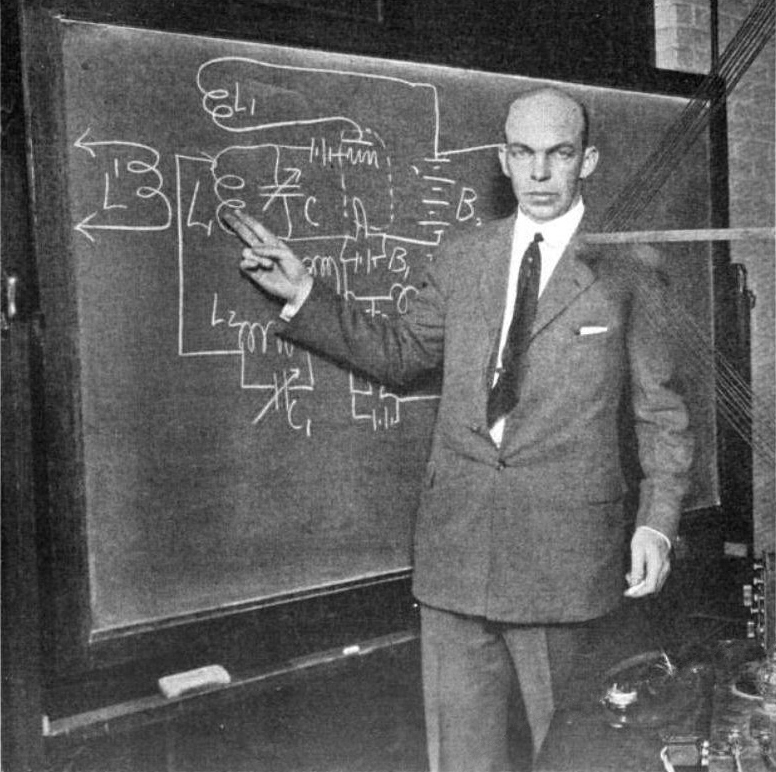
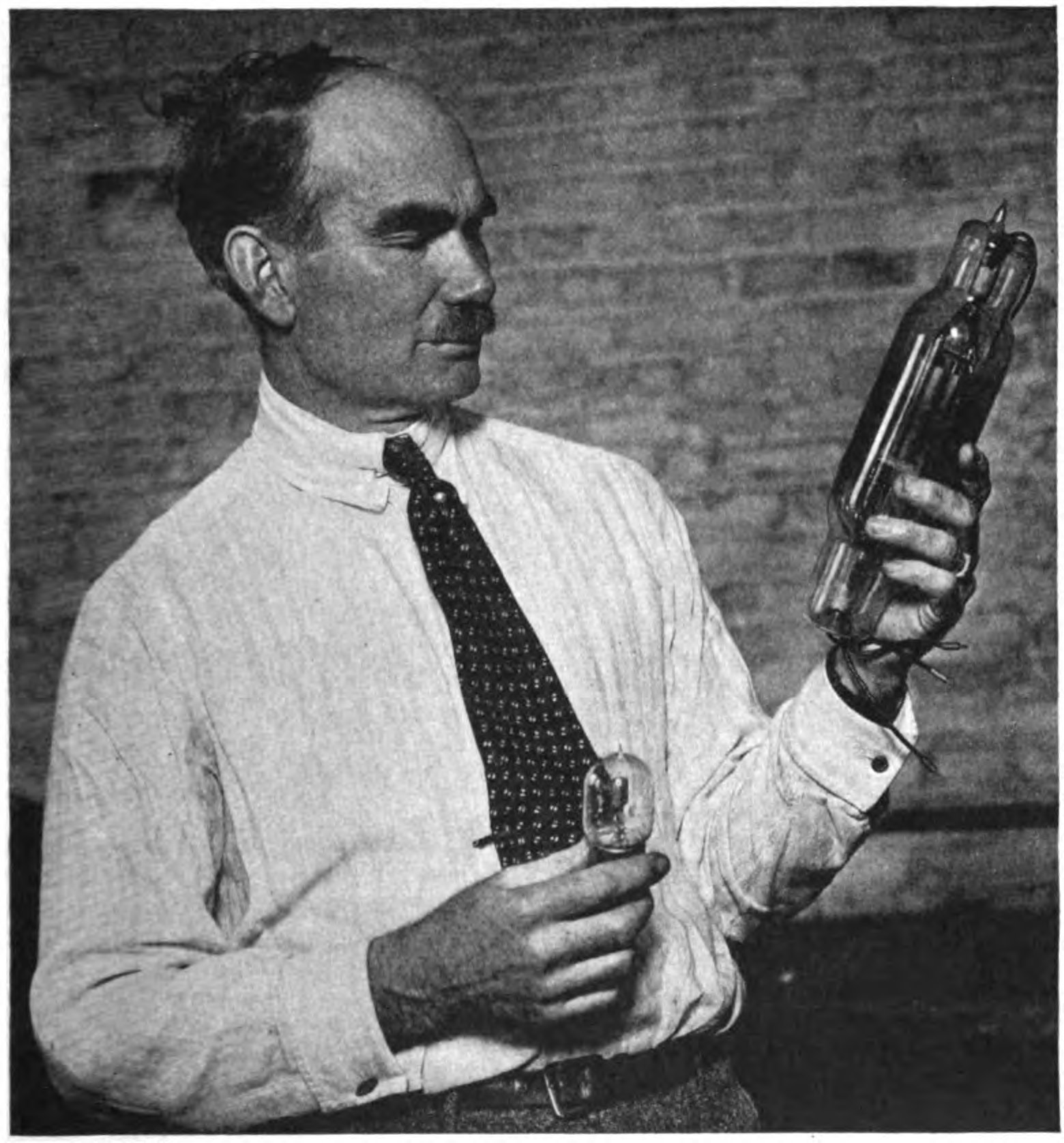
Armstrong and de Forest
- In a lawsuit between inventors Edwin Howard Armstrong and Lee de Forest on the question of who was entitled to the patent for the regenerative circuit, the U.S. District Court for the District of Columbia reversed a finding by the interference board of the U.S. Patent Office, and held that de Forest had invented regeneration. The decision would be upheld by the D.C. Circuit Court of Appeals and by the U.S. Supreme Court.
- Federico Laredo Brú, leader of the short-lived Cuban rebellion, negotiated the terms of his surrender.
- The revised version of the Sergei Prokofiev's Piano Concerto No. 2 was premiered more than 10 years after the September 5, 1913, premiere of the original version. Prokofiev had reconstructed the music after the only manuscript had been destroyed by a fire in 1917.
- Died: Sophie Lyons, 75, American philanthropist and reformed swindler, was fatally injured in a home invasion by three men.

== May 9, 1924 (Friday) ==
- U.S. president Coolidge's attempt to delay the controversial anti-Japanese immigration bill, until March 1, 1925, was defeated in the House of Representatives by a vote of 191 to 171.
- The Richard Strauss ballet Schlagobers (German for "Whipped Cream") was given its first performance, in a premiere at the Vienna State Opera.
- A home rule bill for Scotland was introduced by George Buchanan into the British House of Commons, but the debate degenerated into a shouting match and the Speaker of the House adjourned the session for the day.
- The futuristic Westland Dreadnought, designed for Britain's Westland Aircraft company by Russian-born inventor Nicolas Woyevodsky, crashed on its first, and only, flight. Test pilot Stuart Keep, who had taken the Dreadnought on short takeoff and landing hops, lost control of the aircraft at an altitude of 100 feet (30 m) and plummeted to the ground. Keep survived, but was seriously injured.
- Born: Bulat Okudzhava, popular Soviet Russian folk music singer; in Moscow (d. 1997)

== May 10, 1924 (Saturday) ==
- Voting was held for all 464 seats of Japan's House of Representatives, with 972 candidates running for office. While former foreign minister Katō Takaaki's Kenseikai won 151 seats, no party came close to the 233 needed for a majority. Katō sought to form coalition government with Takahashi Korekiyo's Rikken Seiyūkai party, which had won 103 seats.

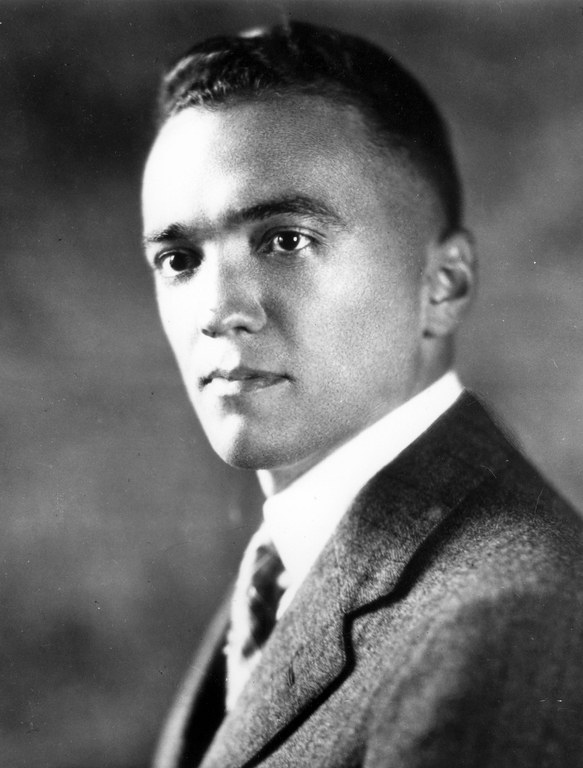
new BOI director Hoover

- J. Edgar Hoover, a 29-year-old lawyer, became the U.S. Justice Department's acting director of the Bureau of Investigation, the predecessor to the Federal Bureau of Investigation (FBI). Hoover, the associate director for William J. Burns, took office on a temporary basis after Burns resigned. U.S. attorney general Harlan Fiske Stone was reportedly expected to appoint former bureau director William J. Burns to the position, but would eventually choose the young prosecutor to the job. Hoover would direct the FBI for the next 48 years and use the bureau to gather information on his political enemies.
- A cave-in trapped five miners in the Black Iron Mine near Gilman, Colorado. All five were rescued 80 hours later, on May 13.
- Born:
  - Edward T. Hall, British scientist known for exposing the Piltdown Man as a fraud, and for inventing a wheelchair with a built-in respirator to allow quadraplegic persons to leave the confinement of bed; in London (d. 2001)
  - Goliarda Sapienza, Italian novelist who achieved posthumous success more than a decade after her death with the publication of L'arte della gioia ("The Art of Joy"); in Catania (d. 1996)
  - Zahrad (pen name for Zareh Yaldizciyan), Turkish Armenian language poet; in Istanbul (d. 2007)
- Died: George Kennan, 79, American explorer known for his ethnographies of many of the native people of Siberia

== May 11, 1924 (Sunday) ==
- The first round of voting for the 581-seat French Chamber of Deputies was held. Runoff elections were held on May 25 for those seats where no candidate had won a majority.
- The dedication of a restored monument to Helmuth von Moltke in Halle, Saxony, Germany turned into a violent confrontation in which eight people died.
- Born:
  - Antony Hewish, British radio astronomer and recipient of the 1974 Nobel Prize in Physics; in Fowey, Cornwall (d. 2021)
- Died:
  - Moses Fleetwood Walker, 67, the first African-American major league baseball player prior to the institution of the color ban in U.S. professional baseball. Walker played one season in 1884 for the Toledo Blue Stockings of the American Association.
  - H. H. Windsor, 64, American publisher and founder (in 1902) of Popular Mechanics magazine
  - John Stedronsky, 73, Austrian-born U.S. baseball player known for being the first Austrian major leaguer and for his career batting average of 0.83

== May 12, 1924 (Monday) ==
- French prime minister Raymond Poincaré, taking the election results as a defeat, said he would resign once the newly elected deputies took their seats in June.
- Nellie Morse became the fourth and last filly to win the Preakness Stakes.
- The Soviet Union began a boycott of Germany over the Bozenhardt incident.
- Two government-owned liquor stores opened in the Canadian province of Alberta, ending Prohibition in that province after eight years.
- Born:
  - Alexander Esenin-Volpin, Russian-born American mathematician known for Esenin-Volpin's theorem and ultrafinitism; in Leningrad (d. 2016)
  - Tony Hancock, English radio and TV comedian known for the 1950s programme Hancock's Half Hour; in Hall Green, Birmingham(d. of suicide, 1968)

== May 13, 1924 (Tuesday) ==
- In Canada, Peter Smith, the former treasurer of the province of Ontario, was arrested along with financier Aemilius Jarvis, on charges of theft and conspiracy to defraud the provincial government, in what became known as the Ontario Bond Scandal. While Smith and Jarvis would be acquitted of theft and fraud, they would both be found guilty of conspiracy on October 24, with Smith being given a three year sentence and spending six months in jail.
- Crowds in Moscow hanged effigies of Gustav Stresemann and Raymond Poincaré during a protest against the Bozenhardt incident.
- Bohemian F.C. of Dublin, commonly called "Bohemians", won their first championship, finishing in first place in the 10-team League of Ireland, the highest level of soccer football competition in the Irish Free State. Bohemians finished with 16 wins, no draws and two losses for 32 points, ahead of runner up Shelbourne F.C. (13-2-3), whom they had defeated 2—0 and 5—2 during the season.
- Born: Gerald Westheimer, German-born Australian professor of ophthalmology and researcher into visual optics; in Berlin (alive in 2026)
- Died: Louis Hirsch, 36, American songwriter, died of pneumonia

== May 14, 1924 (Wednesday) ==
- The new multiracial Legislative Council of Kenya, with 11 white members, 5 Asians and one Arab (but no black Africans) convened for the first time after elections held on April 2.
- In Springfield, Massachusetts, the Methodist general conference committee voted 76 to 37 to recommend to the conference that the Methodist church never again as an organization participate in any kind of warfare under any circumstances, not even self-defense. An amendment to make an exception for wars to save the country and help humanity was tabled.
- The last college championship in the U.S. for cricket was played before the Intercollegiate Cricket Association disbanded, as Haverford College defeated the University of Pennsylvania, 94 to 34.
- Born: Eduard Petiška, popular Czech novelist; in Prague, Czechoslovakia (d. 1987)
- Died: General Fortunato Maycotte, 32, former rebel military officer and supporter of Francisco I. Madero, was executed by firing squad.

== May 15, 1924 (Thursday) ==
- President Coolidge vetoed the World War Adjusted Compensation Act, more commonly called the "Bonus Bill", a grant of benefits for U.S. veterans of World War One. In his veto message, Coolidge wrote, "Patriotism, which is bought and paid for is not patriotism." Congress would override the veto on May 19.

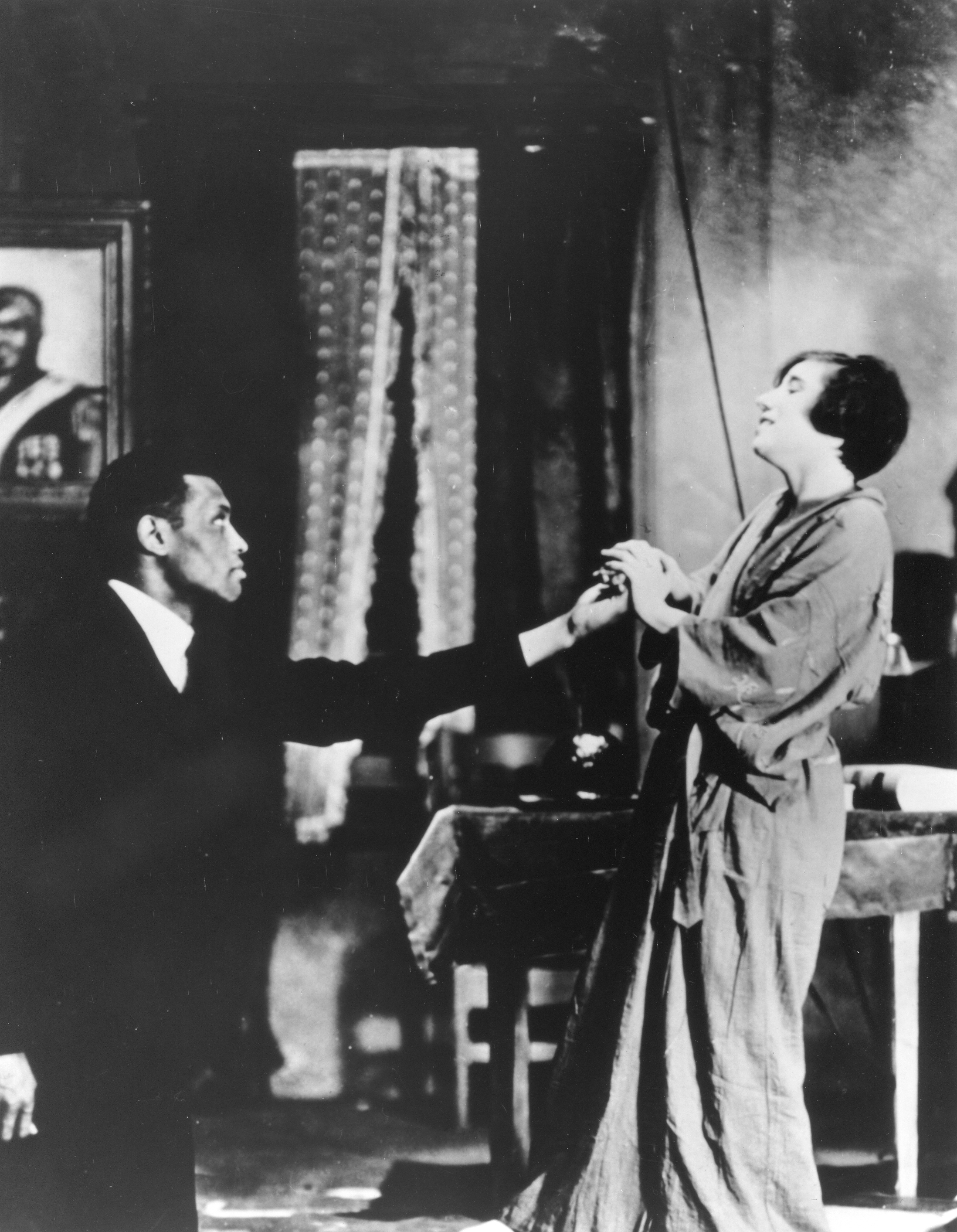
Robeson and Blair's scene was controversial in 1924

- Eugene O'Neill's play All God's Chillun Got Wings, based on a Negro spiritual of the same name, premiered in New York with Paul Robeson as the star. The controversial play, addressing the subject of interracial relations, caused an uproar in the United States because of its scene of Robeson, an African-American actor, having his hand kissed by white actress Mary Blair, who played the role of his character's wife. One critic would write "“The scene where Miss Blair is called upon to kiss and fondle a Negro’s hand is going too far, even for the stage."
- An assassination attempt against China's foreign minister Wellington Koo failed after a bomb was delivered to his home in a gift package. One of Dr. Koo's servants opened the package and was killed, while two others were seriously injured.
- Born:
  - Maria Koepcke, German ornithologist who discovered 14 species of birds in Peru; in Leipzig (killed in the crash of LANSA Flight 508 in 1971). Among the birds named for her are Koepcke's screech owl (Megascops koepckeae), Koepcke's hermit (Phaethornis koepckeae) and Koepcke's hairy-nosed bat (Mimon koepckeae).
  - Ernest C. Wilson Jr., American architect known for designing the Nixon Presidential Library and Museum; in Burbank, California (d. 1992).
  - Don Kenyon, English cricketer who played in international Test Cricket during the 1950s; in Wordsley, Staffordshire (d. 1996)
- Died:
  - Paul Henri Balluet d'Estournelles de Constant, 71, French diplomat and recipient of the 1909 Nobel Peace Prize for organizing the Hague Conferences and co-creating the Permanent Court of Arbitration of the League of Nations
  - Major General Pedro Díaz Molina, 74, former Cuban slave who rose through the ranks to become a general in the Cuban Revolutionary Army
  - Ed Swartwood, 65, American baseball player who was the major league American Association batting champion in 1883

== May 16, 1924 (Friday) ==
- The "control chart", now commonly used for quality control in business, was first proposed by statistician and physicist Walter A. Shewhart, who diagrammed the chart in a memorandum to George Edwards, his boss at Bell Laboratories.
- A Labour government bill to nationalize Britain's coal mining industry was defeated, 264 to 168, when the Liberals refused to support it. The nationalization bill was the first attempt by the government of Prime Minister Ramsay MacDonald to introduce truly socialist legislation.
- The Soviet Russian monthly children's magazine Murzilka published its first issue. Aimed at primary school children aged 6 to 12, Murzika would continue to be published almost a century later, and has been recognized as the longest running children's magazine in the world.
- Born: Dawda Jawara, the first prime minister of the Gambia (1965–1970) and then the president of the Gambia (1970–1994); in Barajally, Gambia Colony and Protectorate (d. 2019)
- Died: Harry Yount, 85, American wilderness guide who served as the first game warden of the first U.S. National Park, Yellowstone National Park

== May 17, 1924 (Saturday) ==
- The United States House of Representatives voted, 313–78, to override President Coolidge's veto of the World War Adjusted Compensation Act, far more than the two-thirds required, and sent the resolution to a vote in the United States Senate.
- Black Gold won the 1924 Kentucky Derby.
- People living near the Kīlauea volcano in Hawaii began to evacuate as a huge eruption appeared imminent.
- The Giant Dipper, a wooden roller coaster that would later be designated a National Historic Landmark and would still be operational almost 100 years later, opened at the Santa Cruz Beach Boardwalk in the U.S. state of California.
- The three planes trying to fly around the world completed the longest and most hazardous leg of their journey, flying from Attu Island in Alaska to Paramashiru in the Kurils.
- Born:
  - Guy Pedroncini, French historian and biographer; in Paris (d. 2006)
  - Gabriel Bacquier, French operatic baritone; in Béziers, Hérault département (d. 2020)
- Died:
  - William "Candy" Cummings, 75, American major league baseball pitcher and Baseball Hall of Fame enshrinee, credited by the Hall with inventing the curve ball
  - José A. Baca, 47, U.S. politician and Lieutenant Governor of New Mexico since January 1, 1923, died of pneumonia.
  - Tankerville Chamberlayne, 80, British politician kicked out of the House of Commons in 1895 for election irregularities

== May 18, 1924 (Sunday) ==
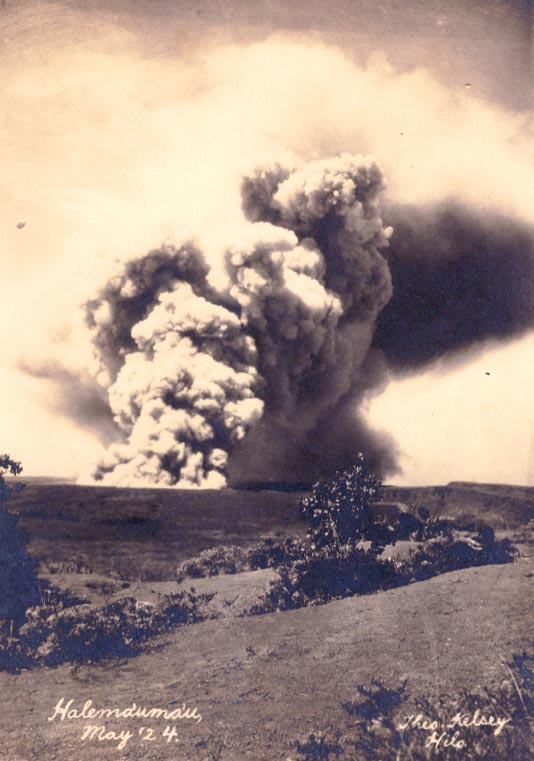
Kilauea erupting in 1924

- The Kīlauea volcano erupted in Hawaii with a violent explosion at the Halema‘uma‘u crater.
- In the last Olympic rugby union game ever played, the United States defeated France, 17 to 3, before 30,000 fans at the Stade Olympique in Colombes, as part of the 1924 Summer Olympic Games. A variant of the sport, rugby sevens, would become an Olympic sport beginning in 2016.
- Born:
  - Wolfgang Rindler, Austrian astrophysicist and author, known for coining the term "event horizon" in his 1956 paper "Visual Horizons in World Models", as well as for the Rindler coordinates and for the ladder paradox; in Vienna (d.2019)
  - Priscilla Pointer, American stage, film and TV actress; in New York City (d. 2025)
  - Maya Kopitseva, Soviet Russian painter; in Gagry, Georgian SSR, Soviet Union (d. 2005)

== May 19, 1924 (Monday) ==
- The United States Senate passed the World War Adjusted Compensation Act (unofficially, the "Bonus Bill") into law when it voted 59–26 to override U.S. president Coolidge's veto.
- The first use of telephone lines to transmit images was made in a demonstration by the American Telephone and Telegraph Company of "a new process of transmitting pictures by electricity". Over a period of two hours, the company transmitted 15 photographs from its office in Cleveland, Ohio to the AT&T headquarters in New York City.
- An attempt by Korean nationalists to assassinate Makoto Saito, the Japanese Governor-General of Korea, failed after one of the eight-member Yukgunjamuibu team fired at Saito's patrol boat from the Chinese side of the Yalu River. The boat, which was conducting border patrol at Saito's request, was able to retreat before further shots could be fired.
- Dr. Roscoe R. Spencer of the U.S. Public Health Service successfully tested his research team's vaccine against Rocky Mountain spotted fever, injecting himself with "a large dose of mashed wood ticks, from lot 2351B, and some weak carbolic acid", after which he and other persons given the vaccine were able to achieve full or partial immunity to the fatal disease.
- A conference in Istanbul to resolve the Mosul question, a dispute between the United Kingdom and Turkey over possession of the former Mosul Vilayet, an oil-abundant province of the Ottoman Empire, broke up with no agreement reached. The Republic of Turkey claimed Mosul, on its south border, while Britain asserted that the territory should be part of the British mandate, the Kingdom of Iraq.
- The Marx Brothers made their Broadway debut with the presentation of the stage show I'll Say She Is at the Casino Theatre.
- The first aerial circumnavigation of Australia was carried out by an RAAF crew in a Fairey IIID.
- Born:
  - Alexander "Sandy" Wilson, English composer and lyricist known for the successful musical The Boy Friend, in Sale, Cheshire (d. 2014)
  - Harry Wald, German-born American casino executive and Holocaust survivor who served as president of the Caesars Palace casino in Las Vegas; as Hans Eichenwald in Rheine (d. 1996)

== May 20, 1924 (Tuesday) ==
- Over one million radio listeners in the United Kingdom listened in on an experimental broadcast from a garden in Surrey in which a nightingale's song was picked up by a microphone concealed in a bush. Cellist Beatrice Harrison played a few soft notes in the garden until the nightingale joined in. It has since been suggested, however, that the "nightingale" was actually the work of a bird impressionist.
- Eight sailors were killed and five wounded in the explosion of an artillery shell during gunnery drills on the French battleship Patrie.
- Born: Stan Paterson, Scottish glaciologist whose research provided data on climate change in the past 100,000 years; in Edinburgh (d. 2013).
- Died: Laure Conan (pen name for Marie-Louise-Félicité Angers), 79, popular French-Canadian novelist, book author and journalist

== May 21, 1924 (Wednesday) ==
- In one of the most famous kidnapping cases in U.S. history, 14-year-old Bobby Franks, son of the millionaire head of a watch manufacturer, disappeared while walking home from school in the Kenwood area of Chicago.
- Many people were injured in Gelsenkirchen during rioting over the Ruhr miners' strike. Belgian troops and German police fought a mob trying to prevent emergency employees from working in the mines.
- In accordance with its participation in the Boxer Protocol for forgiving the Republic of China from the indemnities paid for damage during the Boxer Rebellion of 1900, the U.S. agreed to remit the final $6,137,552.90 of its share for use for improvements by China.
- The Bulgaria national football team played its first international game, a 6 to 0 loss to Austria in Vienna.
- Born: Tjokropranolo, Indonesian politician and Governor of Jakarta, 1977 to 1982 (d. 1998)
- Died: Lucia Fairchild Fuller, 53, American painter, died of multiple sclerosis.

== May 22, 1924 (Thursday) ==
- The Concerto for Piano and Wind Instruments by Igor Stravinsky premiered at the Opera of Paris.
- Bobby Franks' wealthy parents received a ransom note demanding $10,000, but the boy's body was found near Wolf Lake before any money was paid.
- The airmen trying to fly around the world landed at Kasumigaura, Japan where they were welcomed by Japanese military commanders and schoolchildren waving American flags.
- Born:
  - Charles Aznavour (stage name for Shahnour Vaghinag Aznavouryan), French singer of Armenian ancestry, actor and songwriter; in Paris (d. 2018)
  - Cuddly Dudley (stage name for Dudley Heslop), Jamaican born British rock and roll singer, known as ""Britain's first black rock & roller"; in Kingston

== May 23, 1924 (Friday) ==
- The 13th Congress of the Soviet Union's Communist Party, the first since the death of First Secretary Vladimir Lenin, opened at Moscow with 1,164 delegates, 748 of whom had voting rights. The nine-day conference was a confrontation between Joseph Stalin and Leon Trotsky over the future direction of the Communist movement.
- French authorities notified owners of mines in the Ruhr that occupying forces would seize their coal if the coal miners' strike continued.
- Born:
  - Bette Henritze, American stage actress, winner of the 1967 Obie Award for Best Actress; in Betsy Layne, Kentucky (d.2018)
  - Arnaud Fraiteur, Belgian resistance fighter hanged for assassinating Belgian newspaper editor and collaborator with the Nazis, Paul Colin; in Ixelles (d. 1943)
  - Kenneth Grant, English ceremonial magician and occultist, known for founding the Typhonian Order in 1973; in Ilford, Essex (d. 2011)

== May 24, 1924 (Saturday) ==
- U.S. president Coolidge signed into law the Rogers Act, officially the Foreign Service Act of 1924, creating the United States Foreign Service to make diplomatic service a career track by rotating employees to posts around the world.
- The government of the Turkish Republic purchased the Port of Haydarpaşa.
- In a shift on policy of World War I reparations payments, Germany's president Friedrich Ebert ordered the dissolution of the Reich Ministry for Reconstruction (Reichsministerium für Wiederaufbau).
- Born:
  - José Manuel Martín, popular Spanish film and television character actor, primarily in Spaghetti Westerns and EuroHorror films, including the first European western, Savage Guns (Tierra brutal), and I Want Him Dead (Lo voglio morto); in Casavieja (d. 2006)
  - Vincent Cronin, historical writer and biographer, in Tredegar, England (now Wales) (d. 2011)
  - Philip Pearlstein, American painter, in Pittsburgh (d. 2022)

== May 25, 1924 (Sunday) ==
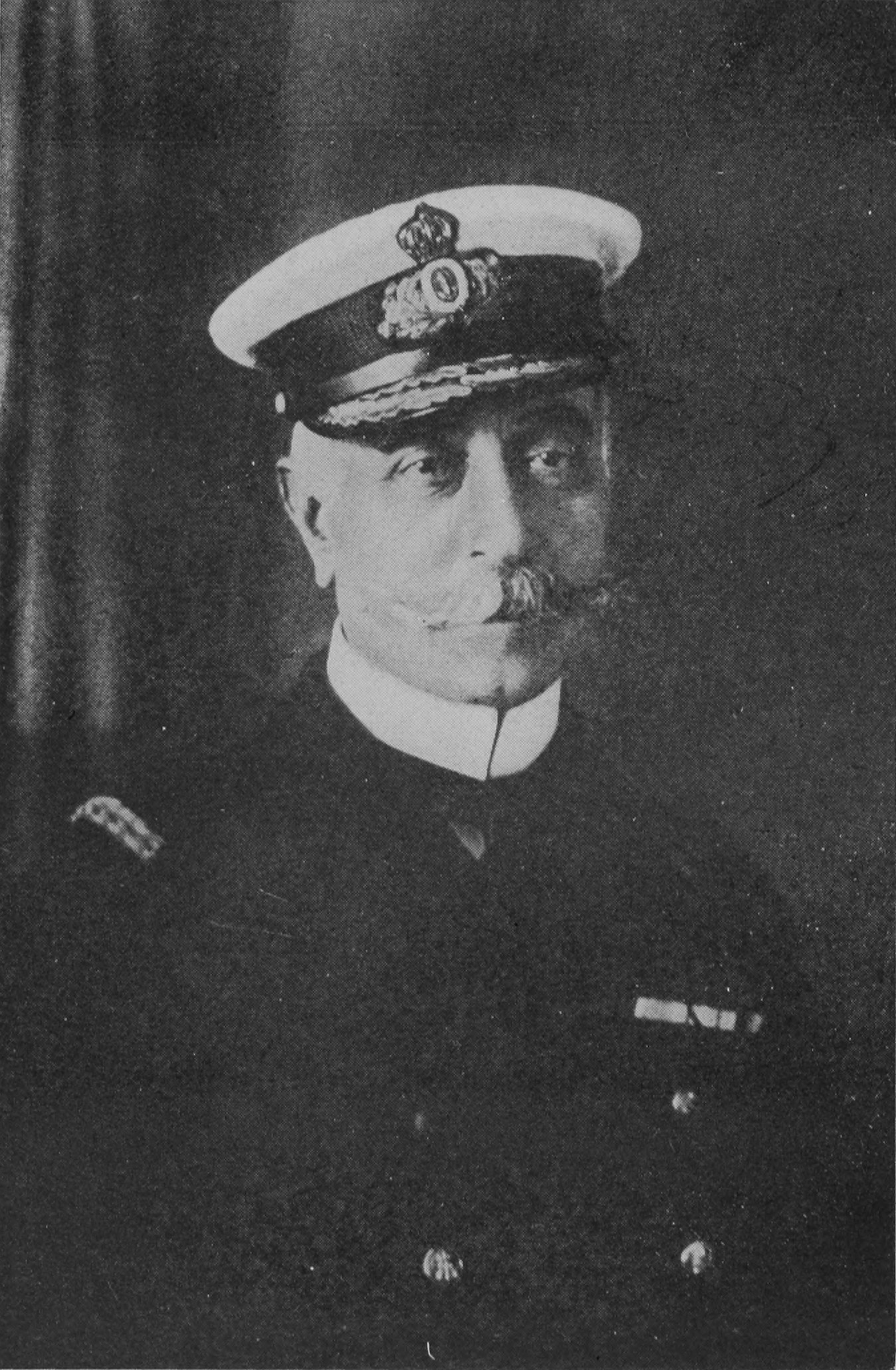
President Kontouriotis

- The Second Hellenic Republic was proclaimed in Greece, as Pavlos Kountouriotis was inaugurated as the former monarchy's new president. Kontouriotis had been serving as the Regent of Greece after King George II had gone into exile on December 23.
- Beulah Annan, who had shot and killed her lover Harry Kalstedt on April 3, was acquitted of murder in her sensationalized trial in Chicago, based on a finding that she had shot Kalstedt in self-defense.
- Born: General Sagadat Nurmagambetov, former Soviet Red Army military officer who later served as the Minister of Defense of Kazakhstan; in Kosym, Kazak ASSR, Russian SFSR, Soviet Union (d. 2013)
- Died:
  - Ashutosh Mukherjee, 59, Indian educator and co-founder of Jadavpur University, Rajabazar Science College and Hazra Law College
  - Theodore F. Morse, 51, American composer of the melodies of numerous popular songs, died of pneumonia.
  - Federico Boyd, 72, co-founder in 1903 of the Republic of Panama and the Central American nation's foreign minister and ambassador to Germany.
  - William Cozens-Hardy, 55, British politician, member of the House of Commons and later of the House of Lords, was killed in an automobile accident in Germany near Starnberg, when his car overturned and he was pinned underneath.

== May 26, 1924 (Monday) ==
- The Johnson–Reed Act, officially the U.S. Immigration Act of 1924, was signed into law by U.S. president Calvin Coolidge to restrict the entry of non-white foreigners into the United States. The Act included the Asian Exclusion Act and National Origins Act (Pub.L. 68–139, 43 Stat. 153), which prevented immigration from Asia and set quotas on the number of immigrants from the Eastern Hemisphere. The broad discrimination against Asians would become one of the factors in spurring Japan against its former allies and eventually into World War II.
- The Battle of Turubah, which would determine the fate of the region that would become Saudi Arabia, was fought between the Kingdom of Hejaz (ruled by King Hussein bin Ali), and the Sultanate of Nejd (ruled by the Sultan Abdulaziz bin Abdul Rahman Al Saud, commonly called "Ibn Saud"). At dawn, 1,500 Ikhwan warriors from Nejd made a surprise attack on the Hejazi encampment of 850 troops at Turubah, killing almost 700 of them. Abdullah I bin Al-Hussein, who was also the ruler of the Emirate of Transjordan, narrowly escaped being killed in the attack.
- The cabinet of German chancellor Wilhelm Marx resigned as he failed to form a new government.
- Died:
  - Victor Herbert, 65, Irish-born, German-raised American composer and conductor, known for the music for the popular 1911 opera Natoma
  - Johann H. Beck, 67, American composer and conductor
  - F. W. Pomeroy, 67, British sculptor

== May 27, 1924 (Tuesday) ==
- The English High Court granted an injunction to the investors of Harry Grindell Matthews, forbidding him from selling the rights to his "death ray" without their consent.
- German president Friedrich Ebert offered the chancellorship to Oskar Hergt, but Hergt voiced too many reservations about the Dawes Plan and so Ebert asked Wilhelm Marx to make another attempt to form a government.
- A lively new session of the Reichstag opened. When Erich Ludendorff was announced, communists heckled him with cries such as "mass murderer". The session was adjourned after communists stood and sang "The Internationale" and nationalists countered with "Deutschland über alles".
- U.S. track athlete Harold Osborn broke the world record for the high jump, clearing the bar at 6 feet, 8¼ inches (almost 2.04 meters) at an Amateur Athletic Union (AAU) meet at the University of Illinois in Champaign.
- Born:
  - Jaime Lusinchi, President of Venezuela from 1984 to 1989; in Clarines (d. 2014)
  - Ernest Martin Ingenito, American spree killer who shot nine people in 1950, five of them fatally; in Wildwood, New Jersey (d. 1995)
- Died: Frank Farrington, 50, British-born U.S. silent film actor, died of choking following a throat infection.

== May 28, 1924 (Wednesday) ==
- The United States Border Patrol was created, as a part of the Labor Appropriation Act of 1924, as a federal agency within the U.S. Department of Labor to enforce the Immigration Act and to prevent illegal entry into the U.S. from Mexico and Canada.
- The government of Japan filed a formal protest to the United States against the Immigration Act of 1924, which had been directed at minimizing immigration to the U.S. from Japan and China.
- The League of Nations demanded the secret of the "death ray" which British inventor Harry Grindell Matthews had claimed to have invented and which he had demonstrated on April 26.
- Max Wallraf was elected as the President of Germany's Reichstag, succeeding Paul Löbe.
- The Ireland national football team played its first match, representing the Irish Free State defeating Bulgaria, 1 to 0, at the 1924 Summer Olympics in Paris. Paddy Duncan scored the team's first goal, 1 to 0.

== May 29, 1924 (Thursday) ==
- A munitions depot exploded two miles west of Bucharest. The city-shaking explosion caused many deaths and damaged the royal palace.
- Nathan Leopold Jr. and Richard Loeb were separately questioned by police about the murder of Bobby Franks.
- Comedian and actor Frank Tinney was arrested in New York City for assaulting Ziegfeld Follies dancer Imogene Wilson.
- Born:
  - Lars Bo, Danish artist and writer (d. 1999)
  - Lavon "Pepper" Paire Davis, baseball player; in Los Angeles (d. 2013)

== May 30, 1924 (Friday) ==
- Italian politician Giacomo Matteotti, leader of the Partito Socialista Unitario (PSI) and a member of parliament, made an impassioned speech at the Chamber of Deputies, criticizing the way the election of the previous month had been conducted and saying it had no validity due to the Fascist tactics of intimidating voters and candidates. His speech was shouted down by Fascists with cries such as "villain" and "traitor".
- Born: Turk Lown, American baseball relief pitcher, known for pitching in 67 of the 154 games of the Chicago Cubs in 1957 to lead the National League in games finished; in Brooklyn, New York (d. 2016)

== May 31, 1924 (Saturday) ==
- Soviet diplomat Lev Karakhan of the Soviet Union, and Foreign Minister Dr. V. K. Wellington Koo of the Republic of China, signed a Sino-Soviet treaty on Soviet-Chinese operation of the Chinese Eastern Railway.
- Nathan Leopold Jr. and Richard Loeb confessed to the murder of Bobby Franks. They said they did it "for the experience, through a spirit of adventure."
- Born: Patricia Roberts Harris, U.S. Secretary of Housing and Urban Development, 1977 to 1979, and Health and Human Services, 1979 to 1981; in Mattoon, Illinois (d. of breast cancer, 1985)
- Died: U.S. Navy Admiral Charles Stockton, 78, President of the Naval War College, later the president of George Washington University
