= Frederick Burlingham =

American explorer and filmmaker

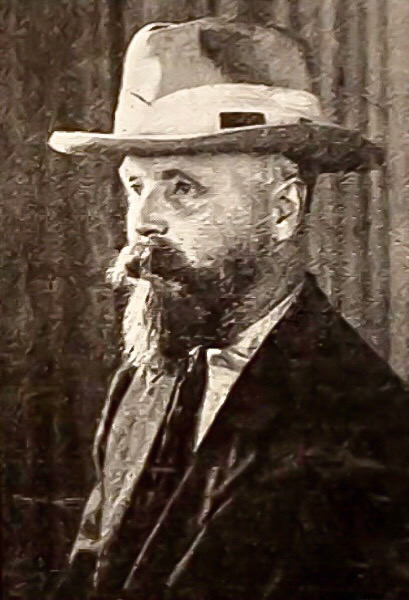
- Motion Picture News, 1921
- Born: Frederick Harrison Burlingham; January 18, 1877; Baltimore, Maryland, United States
- Died: June 9, 1924 (aged 47) (Note: While some sources cite June 8, 1924 as the date of Burlingham's death, the official death records of New York City and the records of the Cincinnati "undertaker" who administered the burial of his body in Ohio document Monday, June 9, 1924 as his death date.); Manhattan, New York, United States
- Occupation: Explorer, journalist, cinematographer, film producer
- Years active: c.1898-1924
- Spouses: Léontine Claudine Richard (m.1912)

Frederick Harrison Burlingham (January 18, 1877 – June 9, 1924) was an American journalist, explorer, cinematographer, and producer of numerous travelogues in the silent era. His most notable works are his films depicting Alpine landscapes and his mountain-climbing expeditions in Europe between 1913 and 1918, his explorations of Borneo in 1920, and his excursions to various sites in the United States and Canada in the early 1920s. He was also an accomplished still photographer and book author, publishing in 1914 How to Become an Alpinist, which is illustrated with his photographs. Burlingham initially produced films while working in London for the British and Colonial Kinematograph Company, but he later developed his films independently and released them under contract with licensed distributors.

== Early life and journalism ==
Born in Baltimore, Maryland in 1877, Frederick was the second of four children of William and Lillian (née Brooks) Burlingham. (Note: Some sources, including Burlingham's 1924 obituaries in The New York Times and The Cincinnati Enquirer, report that he was a native of Virginia; however, federal census records and all of his passport-application documents (1909-1921) confirm that Baltimore, Maryland was his place of birth.) The federal census of 1880 documents that the Burlinghams were still living that year in Baltimore, where Frederick's father worked as a mechanic or, as identified in that record, a "Pump maker". Frederick's first jobs were as a grocery boy and a bookkeeper, and his musical talent as a pianist earned him a scholarship to Peabody Institute, a prestigious conservatory in Baltimore.

By the late 1890s, Burlingham began to focus on a career in journalism, which afforded him opportunities to write and, more importantly, to travel. He relocated to New York City, where he worked for the Evening Post, Commercial Advertiser, the American, and The Evening World. Then, following brief stints as a reporter and editor with other newspapers in Virginia and West Virginia, he sailed to London in 1904. (Note: The cited news item in Motion Picture News indicates that Burlingham originally departed for Europe in 1904, announcing in its July 20, 1918 issue that he "has returned to America after fourteen years' absence".) There he obtained jobs with news outlets before moving to Paris, where he continued his career in journalism and where by 1909 he was described by some citizens in the French capital as "A 'Back-to-Nature' Tramp". Finally, after years of working for an array of newspapers, Burlingham in 1912 turned away from traditional print media and decided to study cinematography, to use the motion-picture camera to record his travels and to share his experiences with audiences in a far more visual, dynamic way.

== Film career ==
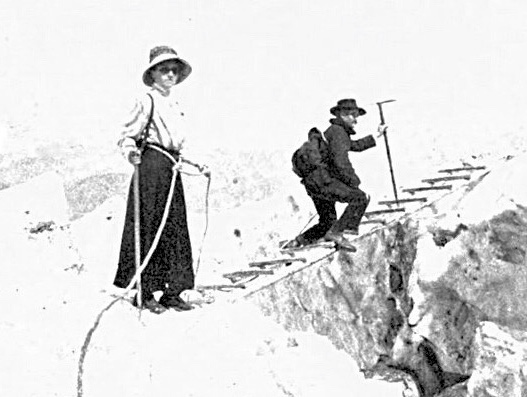
Burlingham's wife Léontine and their guide during ascent of Mont Blanc, 1913

Burlingham left Paris near the end of 1912 and returned to London, where he was soon hired by the British and Colonial Kinematograph Company. In 1913 the company assigned him to travel to Switzerland to film ski-jumping, curling, sleighing, and other Alpine winter sports around St. Moritz. Equipped with a bulky hand-cranked movie camera, a half-plate still camera, and a set of tripods, he also recorded his trek at higher elevations through deep snow at the Bernina Path, as well as ascents of the Matterhorn, Mont Blanc, and the Jungfrau. He continued from those sites to southern Italy, capturing additional scenic footage as he traveled to Mount Vesuvius. There he filmed on December 21, 1913, a deep descent into the volcano's interior. Burlingham and his three Italian assistants were nearly asphyxiated by sulphuric fumes as they used ropes to lower themselves down over 1200 feet "to the bottom of the cone". In addition to releasing Burlingham's films The Ascent of the Matterhorn and Descent into the Crater of Vesuvius, the British and Colonial Company between the latter half of 1913 and August 1914 distributed to English cinemas 21 much shorter travelogues shot by him. Most of those short subjects, which averaged only about seven minutes in running time, consisted of tourist-style depictions of the countryside and resorts in southern France, Switzerland, and in the lake district of northern Italy. (Note: The average length of Burlingham's known films in this period is 438 running feet. Films in the silent era were projected at a "standard" speed of 16 frames per second, much slower than the 24 frames in the sound era. Silent film reels of 1000 feet had an average running time slightly less than 15 minutes, so a 438-foot film would run just shy of seven minutes. See How Movies Work by Bruce F. Kawin (New York: Macmillan, 1987), pp. 46-47.)

At the time British and Colonial hired him, Burlingham already had experience as a mountaineer. He had traveled to the Alps and was familiar with members of the French and Swiss mountain-climbing communities, which included his future wife Léontine, whom he met in Paris and married in London in 1912. He shared memories of some of his climbs in a volume he published in London in 1914, How to Become An Alpinist. In addition to being a basic guide on mountaineering, the book also features a chapter that introduces readers to the "galaxy" of women climbers in the sport and to their accomplishments in that period.

=== Switzerland and return to the United States ===
In 1916, with World War I entering its second year, Burlingham relocated to Montreux, Switzerland to continue the production of his films. The widening armed conflict, however, continued to restrict and disrupt European travel outside the neutral territory of Switzerland, so he launched return-expeditions to the Matterhorn, Mont Blanc, the Jungfrau, and to other Alpine locations far removed from the war's effects. After the United States entered the war in April 1917, Burlingham returned to New York City by July 1918 with his personal film library of over 30,000 feet of master negatives from his European travels. In Manhattan he resumed his work as a producer of "educational" films, and he also registered there in September for American military service. (Note: On his September 8, 1918 United States military registration submitted in New York City, Burlingham identifies his workplace's location in Manhattan as 172 West 72nd Street.) The war in Europe ended just two months later, so the 41-year-old Burlingham was never inducted to serve.

=== Expedition to Borneo and final years ===
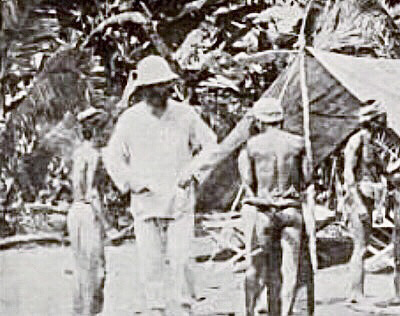
Film frame of Burlingham with natives of Borneo, 1920

After World War I and until his death, Burlingham continued to re-edit and release in the United States his past films like The Ascent of the Matterhorn, Mont Blanc, and Descent into the Crater of Vesuvius. He also traveled to new destinations to shoot footage for fresh releases. From late 1919 through 1920, he ventured to Southeast Asia to explore and film the landscapes and native peoples of that region, including the Dayak culture of Borneo and areas in that island's interior "never explored before" or documented by Westerners. Burlingham was back in the United States by 1921. Later that year he began releasing bi-monthly through Truart Film Corporation installments of a series of 26 one-reel "Burlingham Adventures" produced from his most recent travels, beginning with The Wild Men of Borneo, The Lure of the South Seas, The Island of Surprise, A Borneo Venice, and Monkey Land Up the Barito River. Before and after his trip to Borneo, he also filmed excursions to various locales in the United States and Canada, to sites such as Niagara Falls and the Suwannee River that runs from southern Georgia into Florida. Burlingham during the last three years of his life continued to produce and release more travelogues from his large film collection, presented lectures about his expeditions, worked on a book about Borneo, and wrote articles for The National Geographic and other science and film publications.

== Personal life and death ==
During his years living and traveling in Europe, Burlingham met many fellow Alpine climbers and hiking enthusiasts, including "a wealthy French widow", Madame Léontine Richard of Paris, whom he married in London in 1912. When Burlingham died in New York City in June 1924 at "his home" at 13 Vandam Street in Manhattan, he and Léontine were still married, although newspapers reported she was in Geneva, Switzerland. (Note: Images of Léontine Burlingham's original passport applications and their amendments survive from the period and document that she accompanied Frederick on his 1919-1920 journey to Southeast Asia for the purposes of "taking motion pictures".) The cause of Frederick's death was attributed to a heart attack linked to complications from a severe kidney infection. His body was transferred to Cincinnati, Ohio, where his younger brother Prentice lived and is the city identified by Frederick on his passport applications as his "permanent residence" in the United States. Burlingham's gravesite is adjacent to those of his parents and siblings in Cincinnati's Spring Grove Cemetery.

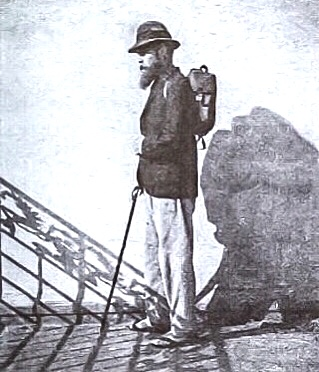
"Burly" in his favorite attire, including sandals, a walking stick, and backpack, 1915

Burlingham's death was widely announced in leading American film-industry publications. The Film Daily on June 15, 1924, issued a distinctly personal tribute regarding the loss of their 47-year-old colleague "Burly". The trade paper also shared an anecdote about how his relaxed, unconventional personality once cost him a newspaper job in Paris in 1912:

We're going to miss Fred Burlingham...One of the unusual figures of the business. With his long beard and soft manner. Who loved to go to out of the way places for shots. Burlingham was formerly a newspaper man. At one time he worked for James Gordon Bennett of the Paris Herald. That is he once did—until Bennett noticed that Burlingham was going about Paris wearing sandals. That was too much for the aristocratic Bennett. He fired Burlingham on the spot. Because "Burly" wouldn't buy regulation shoes.

== Surviving films and photographs ==
Unfortunately, Burlingham's footage of his 1913 ascents of the Matterhorn and Mont Blanc were lost early on in his employment with British and Colonial. In October that year a fire at the company's Endell Street processing plant in London destroyed the original negatives before any copies of those films were printed. Nearly all of Burlingham's other travelogues are believed to be lost. Two of his films, however, are preserved in the British National Film Archives. An undocumented source also contends that another one of his films is held in the "Norwegian Archives", but online searches of the holdings of the Norwegian Film Institute and broader searches through the European Union's "Film Gateway" reveal none of Burlingham's films. A nearly complete copy of his 1913 release Ascent of the Matterhorn is preserved in Switzerland and is available for viewing on the YouTube video-streaming service. This film, the only known print copy, was found in 1953 in a cabinet in Zermatt, Switzerland. Recognized as "the first documentary filming of an ascent of an Alpine peak", its original negative reel was lost in a shipwreck in the Atlantic. Examples of Burlington's work in still photography survive as well as illustrations in period trade journals, papers, and books. His noted 1914 volume How to Become an Alpinist features 63 of his photographs.

== Selected filmography ==
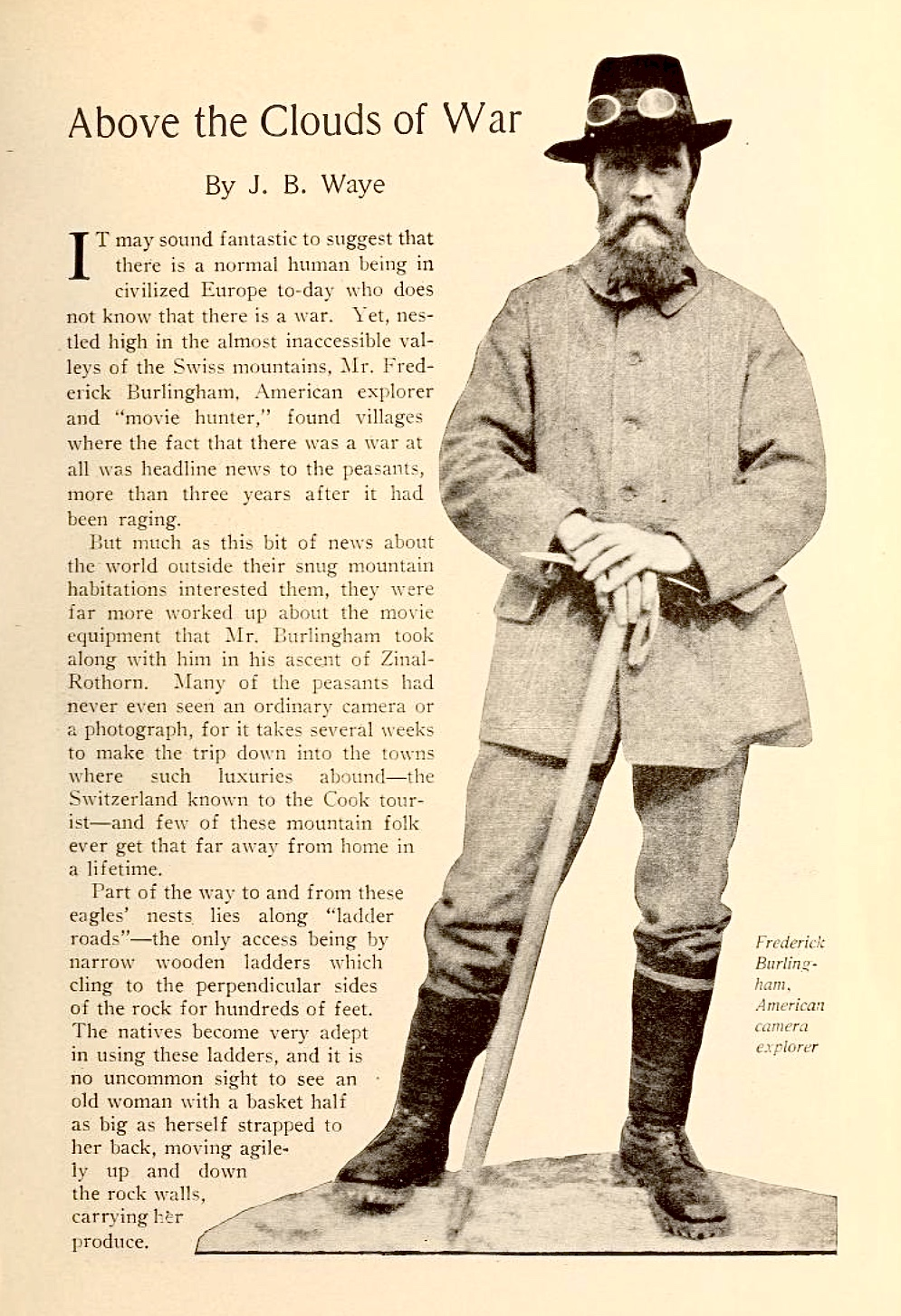
The "American camera explorer" featured in Picture-Play Magazine, 1918

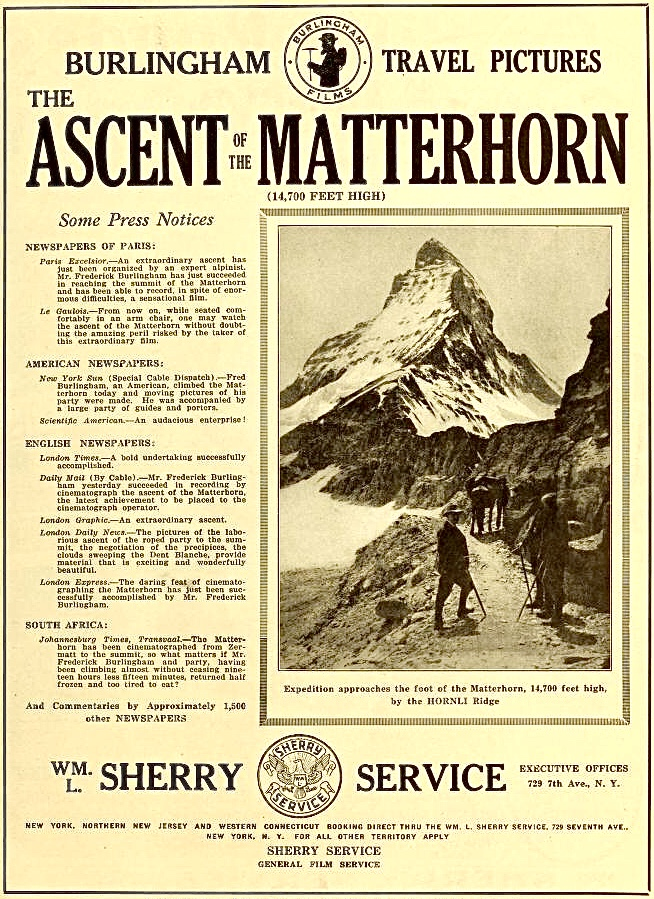
Burlingham's Alpine films promoted in Moving Picture World, 1919

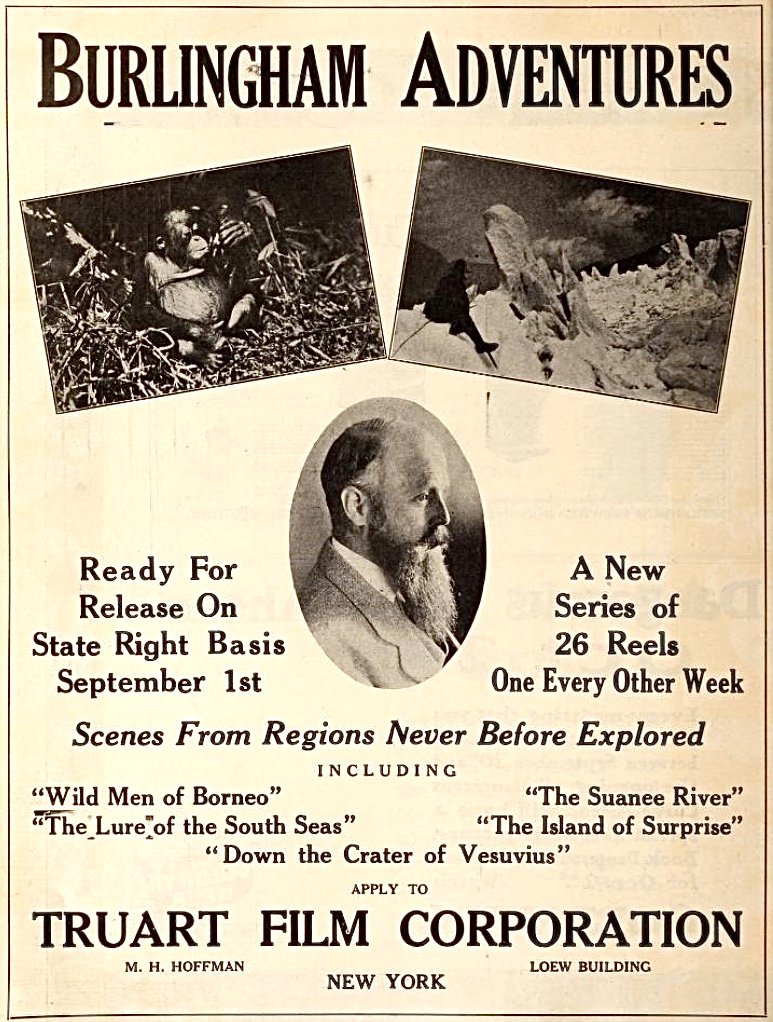
"Burlingham Adventures" distributed by Truart, 1921

- Up and Down the Swanee [sic] River (1921)
- The Lure of the South Seas (1921)
- The Island of Surprise (1921)
- Jungle Belles of Borneo (1921)
- A Wedding Feast Among the Borneo Dayaks (1921)
- A Borneo Venice (1921)
- Monkey Land Up the Barito River (1921)
- The Wild Men of Borneo (1921)
- An Italian Paradise, visit to Lake Como (1916)
- Chamonix in Summer (1916)
- Arctic Exploration in Switzerland (1916)
- La Suisse Inconnue: La Vallée de Loetschenthal (1916)
- The Jungfrau Railway (1916)
- The Gemmi Pass (1916)
- A Famous Swiss Pass (1916)
- Swiss Army Sketches (1916)
- French Prisoners in Leysin (1916)
- Wildest Wales (1915)
- Bettws-Y-Coed, North Wales
- Bath, A Famous British Spa (1915)
- The Ascent of Mont Blanc (1915)
- Climbing the Jungfrau (1915)
- London in Wartime (1915)
- Lunch at the Zoo (1915)
- Scenes on Lake Como, Italy (1914)
- Through Switzerland in Ten Minutes (1915)
- A Funicular Ride to Murottas and Muraigl (1914)
- Picturesque Berne (1914)
- The Bernina Railway in Winter (1914)
- Ostrich Farming at Nice (1914)
- Springtime in Nice (1914)
- In a Sea Garden (1914), documenting the Prince of Monaco's Museum
- In the Land of Roses (1914)
- A Trip Round Sunny Marseilles (1914)
- Descent into the Crater of Vesuvius (1914)
- Alpine Adventures; A Jaunt on the Jungfrau (1913)
- Winter Sports at Suvretta (1913)
- A Trip to the Gornergrat (1913)
- The Ascent of the Matterhorn (1913)
- From Montreux to Rochers De Naye via Territet (1913)
- Winter Sports at St. Moritz (1913)
- The Grand St. Bernard Hospice (1913)
- Europe's Winter Playground (1913)
