= Timeline of the Red Sea crisis (2023) =

These are monthly timelines for the year 2023 of the Red Sea crisis, which began on 19 October 2023.

== October 2023 ==
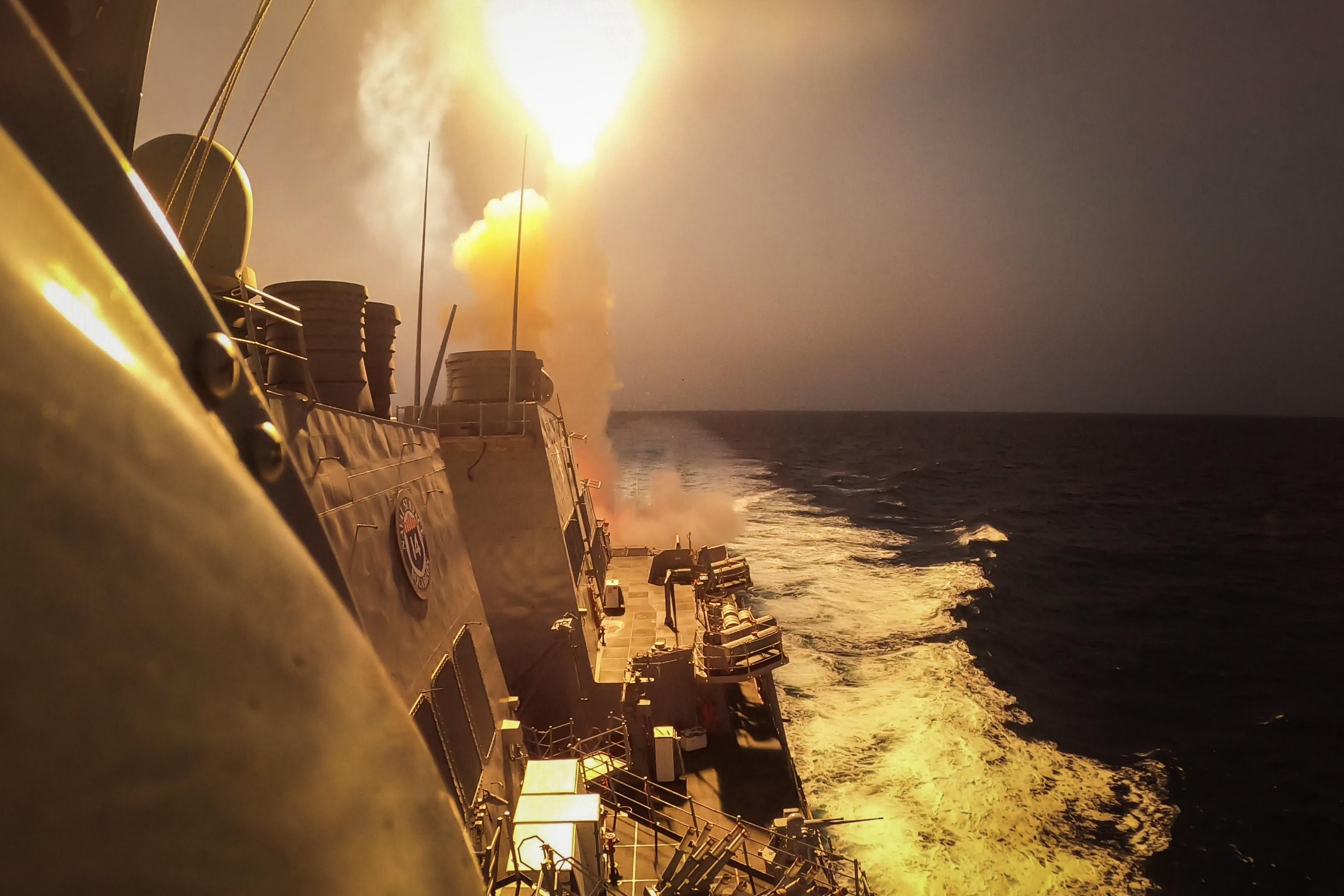
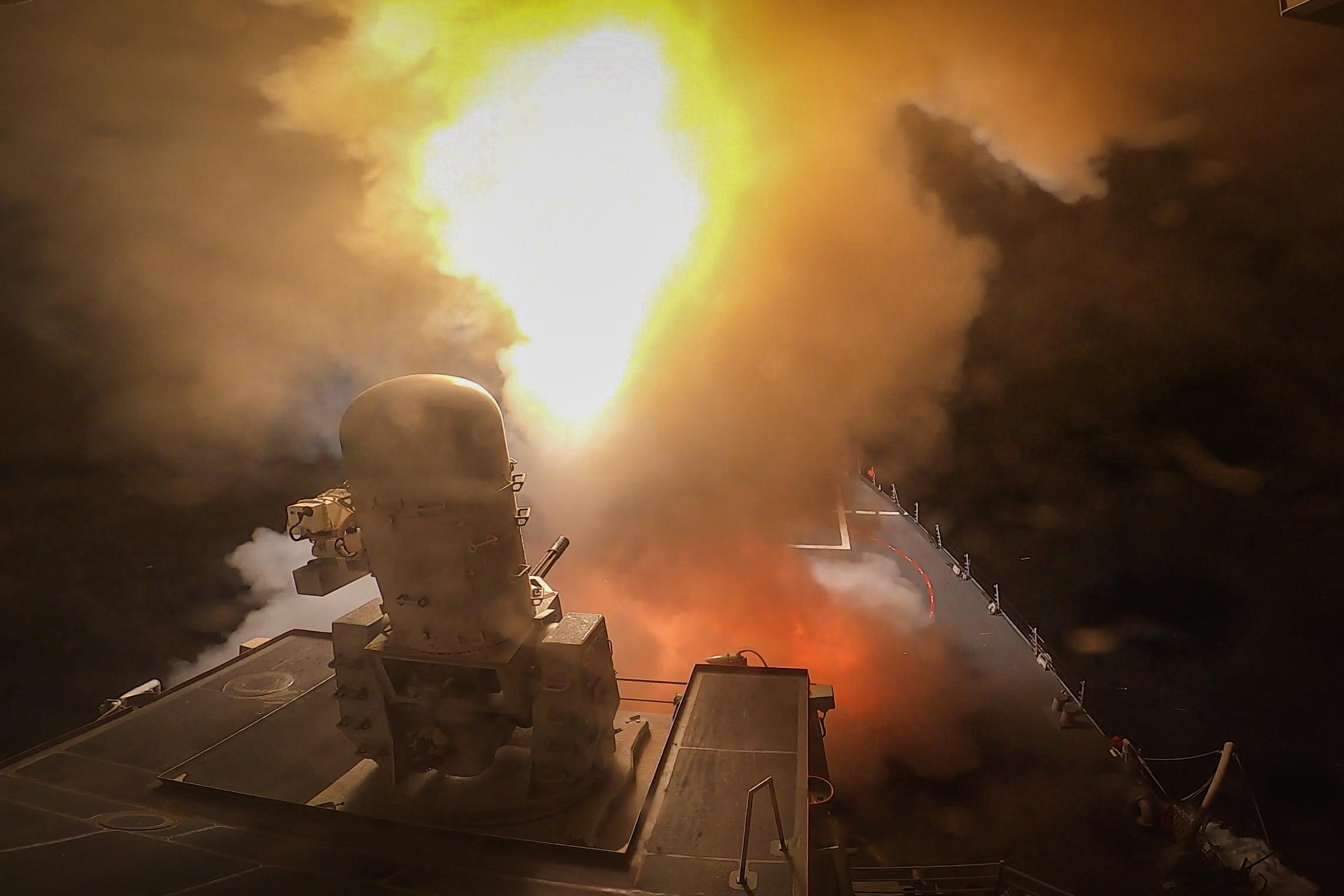
USS Carney engages with Houthi missiles, 19 October 2023.

On 8 October 2023, the day after the October 7 attacks, U.S. Secretary of Defense Lloyd Austin directed the Gerald R. Ford carrier strike group to the Eastern Mediterranean in response. Along with the aircraft carrier USS Gerald R. Ford, the group includes the cruiser Normandy, and the destroyers Carney, Ramage, Roosevelt and Thomas Hudner.

On 19 October 2023, US officials said the United States Navy destroyer USS Carney shot down three land-attack cruise missiles and several drones heading toward Israel launched by the Houthis in Yemen. This was the first action by the US military to defend Israel since the outbreak of the war. It was later reported that the ship shot down four cruise missiles and 15 drones. Another missile was reportedly intercepted by Saudi Arabia. More were intercepted by Israel's Arrow anti-ballistic missiles; others fell short of their targets or were intercepted by the Israeli Air Force and the French Navy.

On 27 October 2023 two loitering munitions were fired in a northerly direction from the southern Red Sea. According to Israel Defense Forces (IDF) officials, their target was Israel, but they did not cross the border from Egypt. Of the two drones, one fell short and hit a building adjacent to a hospital in Taba, Egypt, injuring six; the other was shot down near an electricity plant close to the town of Nuweiba, Egypt. A Houthi official later made a one-word post on Twitter after the drone crashed in Taba, mentioning the nearby Israeli city of Eilat.

On 31 October an alert was triggered in Eilat, Eilot kibbutz and the Shahorit industrial park area regarding the penetration of hostile aircraft from the Red Sea. The aircraft was successfully intercepted over the Red Sea. The Arrow system intercepted a ballistic missile and the air force intercepted several cruise missiles fired from the Red Sea toward Eilat. The Houthis took responsibility for the launches. One cruise missile was shot down by an F-35i Adir jet. The downing of the missile by the Arrow system marked the first time it was used in the Gaza war. According to Israeli officials, the interception occurred above Earth's atmosphere above the Negev Desert, making it the first instance of space warfare in history.

== November 2023 ==
On 1 November at 00:45 the IDF intercepted an air threat fired from Yemen and identified south of Eilat. A US MQ-9 Reaper drone was shot down off the coast of Yemen by Houthi air defences on 8 November; the Pentagon previously said that MQ-9 drones were flying over Gaza in an intelligence gathering role to aid in the hostage recovery efforts. On 9 November, the Houthis fired a missile toward the city of Eilat. The missile was intercepted by an Arrow 3 missile, marking the first time it was used in an interception.

On 14 November the Houthis fired numerous missiles, one of which was aimed toward the city of Eilat. The missile was intercepted by an Arrow missile according to Israeli officials. The following day, US officials said that USS Thomas Hudner shot down a drone, fired from Yemen, that was headed toward it. On 22 November, the Houthis fired a cruise missile aimed toward the city of Eilat. Israeli officials said the missile was successfully shot down by an F-35. On 23 November 2023, US officials said that the destroyer USS Thomas Hudner had shot down several attack drones launched from Yemen.

On 29 November 2023 US officials said the US Navy destroyer USS Carney shot down a Houthi KAS-04 drone as the destroyer approached the Bab-el-Mandeb Strait. On 30 November 2023, Saudi media reported that an Israeli airstrike caused an explosion at a Houthi arms depot in Sana'a, the capital of Yemen. Houthi officials denied the report, stating that a gas station was hit instead. A member of the Houthis' political bureau, Hezam al-Asad, said that the explosion was caused by the remnants of a bomb left over from the Yemeni civil war.

== December 2023 ==
On 6 December, the Houthi movement launched several ballistic missiles at Israeli military posts in Eilat. On the same day, USS Mason shot down a drone launched from Yemen. There were no clear indications of its target.

On 10 December, the French Navy's frigate Languedoc, operating in the Red Sea, intercepted two drones launched from Hodeida, a Houthi-held port. On 11 December 2023, the Norwegian oil tanker Strinda, fell victim to an overnight air attack, causing a fire on board. The Languedoc intervened once again, intercepted a Houthi drone targeting the damaged tanker and subsequently placed itself in the protection of the vessel, preventing further attacks. The fire was brought under control and no injuries were reported. The vessel was then escorted to the Gulf of Aden out of the threat zone by an American destroyer, USS Mason. The US Navy reportedly shot down 14 drones on 16 December 2023, while Egyptian Air Defense Forces intercepted an object flying near Dahab.

On 14 December 2023, India initiated Operation Sankalp to ensure the security of the regional maritime domain. The destroyer INS Kolkata was stationed in the Gulf of Aden for maritime security on 18 December. The destroyer INS Kochi was already deployed in the region to counter Somali pirates, although the Government of India remains silent about its involvement in Operation Prosperity Guardian.

By 21 December 2023, the port of Eilat, which gives Israel via the Red Sea its only easy shipping access to Asia without the need to transit the Suez Canal, had seen an 85% drop in activity due to the Houthi action.

On 26 December 2023, Houthis said they carried out drone attacks on Eilat and other parts of Israel. The US shot down 12 drones and 5 missiles fired by them, and the IDF said they also shot down a projectile launched from Yemen, targeting Israel, over the Red Sea, off the coast of the Sinai Peninsula. On 26 December, India deployed the destroyers INS Mormugao and Visakhapatnam in the Arabian Sea after an Israel-affiliated merchant vessel was struck off the Indian coast. The navy was investigating the nature of the attack on the vessel, MV Chem Pluto, which docked in Mumbai on Monday, and initial reports pointed to a drone attack, a navy statement said. The Pentagon said on Saturday that a drone launched from Iran struck the Chem Pluto in the Indian Ocean. The Foreign Ministry of Iran denied the US accusations and called them "baseless". The vessel's crew included 21 Indians and 1 Vietnamese citizen.

== See also ==
- Gaza war – The war between Israel and Hamas as well as allied Palestinian groups that began concurrently.
- Hezbollah–Israel conflict (2023–present) - The conflict between Israel and Hezbollah that began concurrently.
