= Thomas J. Hudner Jr. =

United States Navy officer (1924–2017)

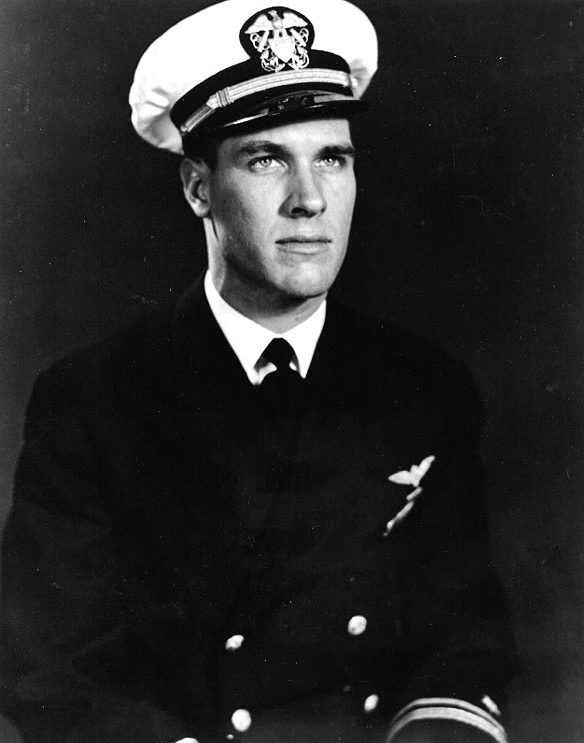
- Hudner in 1950
- Born: August 31, 1924; Fall River, Massachusetts, U.S.
- Died: November 13, 2017 (aged 93); Concord, Massachusetts, U.S.
- Burial place: Arlington National Cemetery
- Military career
- Allegiance: United States
- Branch: United States Navy
- Service years: 1946–1973
- Rank: Captain
- Nickname: "Lou"
- Units: Fighter Squadron 32; USS Helena (CA-75); Carrier Division 3; Development Squadron 3; 60th Fighter-Interceptor Squadron; Fighter Squadron 53; USS Kitty Hawk (CV-63)
- Commands: Fighter Squadron 53; Training Squadron 24
- Conflicts: Korean War; Battle of Chosin Reservoir; Vietnam War
- Awards: Medal of Honor; Legion of Merit; Bronze Star Medal; Air Medal (2); Taegeuk Order of Military Merit

Thomas Jerome Hudner Jr. (August 31, 1924 – November 13, 2017) was a United States Navy officer and naval aviator. He rose to the rank of captain and received the Medal of Honor for attempting to save the life of his wingman, Ensign Jesse L. Brown, during the Battle of Chosin Reservoir in the Korean War.

Born in Fall River, Massachusetts, Hudner attended Phillips Academy in Andover, Massachusetts and the United States Naval Academy in Annapolis, Maryland. Initially uninterested in aviation, he eventually trained as a pilot and joined Fighter Squadron 32, flying the F4U Corsair at the outbreak of the Korean War. Arriving off Korea in October 1950, he flew support missions from the aircraft carrier USS Leyte (CV-32).

On December 4, 1950, Hudner and Brown were among a group of pilots on patrol near the Chosin Reservoir when Brown's Corsair was hit by ground fire from Chinese troops and crashed. In an effort to save Brown from his burning aircraft, Hudner intentionally crash-landed his own aircraft on a snowy mountainside in freezing temperatures. Despite his efforts, Brown died of his injuries, and Hudner was forced to leave his body behind, as a rescue helicopter could not remain after nightfall and Hudner had been injured in the landing.

Following the incident, Hudner served aboard several U.S. Navy ships and with multiple aviation units, including a brief stint as executive officer of USS Kitty Hawk (CV-63) during a tour in the Vietnam War, before retiring in 1973. In later years, he worked with various veterans' organizations in the United States. The Arleigh Burke-class guided missile destroyer USS Thomas Hudner (DDG-116) is named in his honor.

== Early life and education ==
Hudner was born August 31, 1924, in Fall River, Massachusetts. His father, Thomas Hudner Sr., was a businessman of Irish descent who ran a chain of grocery stores, Hudner's Markets. Three brothers were later born, named James, Richard, and Phillip.

Hudner entered the prestigious Phillips Academy in Andover, Massachusetts, in 1939. His family had a long history in the academy, with his father graduating in 1911 and his uncle, Harold Hudner, graduating in 1921. Eventually, the three younger Hudner children would attend the academy as well; James in 1944, Richard in 1946 and Phillip in 1954. During his time in the high school, Thomas was active in several organizations, serving as a team captain in the school track team as well as a member of the football and lacrosse teams, a class officer, a member of student council, and an assistant house counselor.

== Career ==
Following the attack on Pearl Harbor and the United States' entry into World War II, Hudner heard a speech by academy headmaster Claude Fuess which he later said inspired him to join the military. One of 10 from Phillips to be accepted into the academy from his class, he entered the United States Naval Academy in Annapolis, Maryland, in 1943 and graduated in 1946. By the time he was commissioned, however, World War II had ended. Hudner attended the Naval Academy with a number of notable classmates, including James B. Stockdale, Jimmy Carter, Jeremiah Denton, and Stansfield Turner. He played college football at the academy, eventually becoming a starting running back for the junior varsity team.

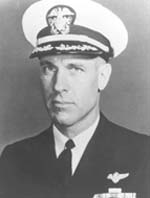
Hudner later in his career

After graduation, Hudner served as a communications officer aboard several surface ships. During his initial years in the military, Hudner said he had no interest in aircraft. After a one-year tour of duty aboard the Baltimore-class heavy cruiser USS Helena, which was operating off the coast of Taiwan, he transferred to a post as a communications officer at the Naval Base Pearl Harbor where he served for another year. By 1948, Hudner became interested in aviation, and applied to flight school, seeing it as "a new challenge". He was accepted into Naval Air Station Pensacola in Pensacola, Florida, where he completed basic flight training, and was transferred to Naval Air Station Corpus Christi in Texas, where he completed advanced flight training and qualified as a naval aviator in August 1949. After a brief posting in Lebanon, Hudner was assigned to VF-32 aboard the aircraft carrier USS Leyte, piloting the F4U Corsair. He later said he enjoyed this assignment, as he considered the Corsair to be "safe and comfortable".

=== Korean War ===
On the night of June 25, 1950, the North Korean People's Army launched a full-scale invasion of its neighbor to the south, the Republic of Korea. It caught the Republic of Korea Army by surprise, resulting in a rout. To prevent South Korea's collapse, the United Nations Security Council voted to send military forces.

The United States Seventh Fleet dispatched Task Force 77 to provide air and naval support. All United States Navy units and ships were placed on alert. Leyte was in the Mediterranean Sea, and Hudner did not expect to be deployed to Korea, but on August 8, a relief carrier arrived, and Leyte was ordered to Korea. Naval commanders felt the VF-32 pilots on Leyte were better trained and prepared than those of other available carriers, so they were among the first dispatched to the theater. Leyte sailed across the Atlantic Ocean, through the Panama Canal and arrived in the waters off Korea around October 8. The ship joined Task Force 77 off the northeast coast of the Korean Peninsula.

Hudner flew 20 missions. These missions included attacks on communication lines, troop concentrations, and military installations around Wonsan, Chongpu, Songjim, and Senanju.

United Nations (UN) forces defeated the North Koreans and advanced into North Korea. With its ally in danger of collapse, the People's Republic of China entered the war in October. The surprised, outnumbered UN forces had to fight desperately for survival. Almost 100,000 Chinese troops surrounded 15,000 American troops in the vicinity of the Chosin Reservoir. In the Battle of Chosin Reservoir, Hudner and his squadron were dispatched to provide close air support for the American X Corps against the Chinese People's Volunteer Army's 9th Army. The pilots on Leyte were flying dozens of missions every day.

==== Medal of Honor action ====
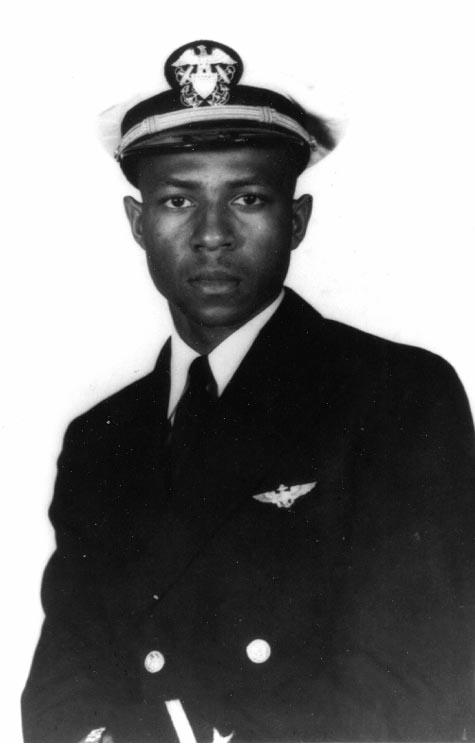
Ensign Jesse L. Brown. Hudner received the Medal of Honor for attempting to save Brown in 1950

On December 4, 1950, Hudner was part of a six-aircraft flight supporting U.S. Marine Corps ground troops who were trapped by Chinese forces. At 13:38, he took off from Leyte with squadron executive officer Lieutenant Commander Dick Cevoli, Lieutenant George Hudson, Lieutenant Junior Grade Bill Koenig, Ensign Ralph E. McQueen, and the first African American Naval Aviator, Ensign Jesse L. Brown, who was Hudner's wingman. The flight traveled 100 miles (160 km) from Task Force 77's location to the Chosin Reservoir, flying 35 to 40 minutes through very harsh wintery weather to the vicinity of the villages Yudam-ni and Hagaru-ri. The flight began searching for targets along the west side of the reservoir, lowering their altitude to 700 feet (210 m) in the process. The three-hour search and destroy mission was also an attempt to probe Chinese troop strength in the area.

Though the flight spotted no Chinese, at 14:40 Koenig radioed to Brown that he appeared to be trailing fuel. The damage had likely come by small arms fire from Chinese infantry, who were known to hide in the snow and ambush passing aircraft by firing in unison. At least one bullet had ruptured a fuel line. Brown, losing fuel pressure and increasingly unable to control the aircraft, dropped his drop tanks and rockets and attempted to land the craft in a snow-covered clearing on the side of a mountain. Brown crashed into a bowl-shaped valley at approximately 40°36′N 127°06′E, near Somong-ni, 15 miles (24 km) behind Chinese lines; the temperature was 15 °F (−9 °C). The aircraft broke up violently upon impact and was destroyed. In the crash, Brown's leg was pinned beneath the fuselage of the Corsair, and he stripped off his helmet and gloves in an attempt to free himself, before waving to the other pilots, who were circling close overhead. Hudner and the other airborne pilots thought Brown had died in the crash, and they immediately began a mayday radio to any heavy transport aircraft in the area as they canvassed the mountain for any sign of nearby Chinese ground forces. They received a signal that a rescue helicopter would come as soon as possible, but Brown's aircraft was smoking and a fire had started near its internal fuel tanks.

Hudner attempted in vain to rescue Brown via radio instruction, before intentionally crash-landing his aircraft, running to Brown's side and attempting to wrestle him free from the wreck. With Brown's condition worsening by the minute, Hudner attempted to drown the aircraft fire in snow and pull Brown from the aircraft, all in vain. Brown began slipping in and out of consciousness, but in spite of being in great pain, did not complain to Hudner. A rescue helicopter arrived around 15:00, and Hudner and its pilot, Lieutenant Charles Ward, were unable to put out the engine fire with a fire extinguisher. They tried in vain to free Brown with an axe for 45 minutes. They briefly considered, at Brown's request, amputating his trapped leg. Brown lost consciousness for the last time shortly thereafter. His last known words, which he told Hudner, were "tell Daisy I love her." The helicopter, which was unable to operate in the darkness, was forced to leave at nightfall with Hudner, leaving Brown behind. Brown is believed to have died shortly thereafter of his injuries and exposure to the extreme cold. No Chinese forces threatened the site, likely because of the heavy air presence of the VF-32 pilots.

Hudner begged his superiors to allow him to return to the wreck to help extract Brown, but his request was denied, as they feared an ambush of vulnerable helicopters resulting in additional casualties. In order to prevent the body and the aircraft from falling into enemy hands, the U.S. Navy bombed the crash site with napalm two days later; the aircrew recited the Lord's Prayer over the radio as they watched flames consume Brown's body. The pilots observed that his body looked to have been disturbed and his clothes stolen, but he was still stuck in the aircraft. The remains of both Brown and the aircraft were never recovered. Brown was the first African-American U.S. Navy officer killed in the war.

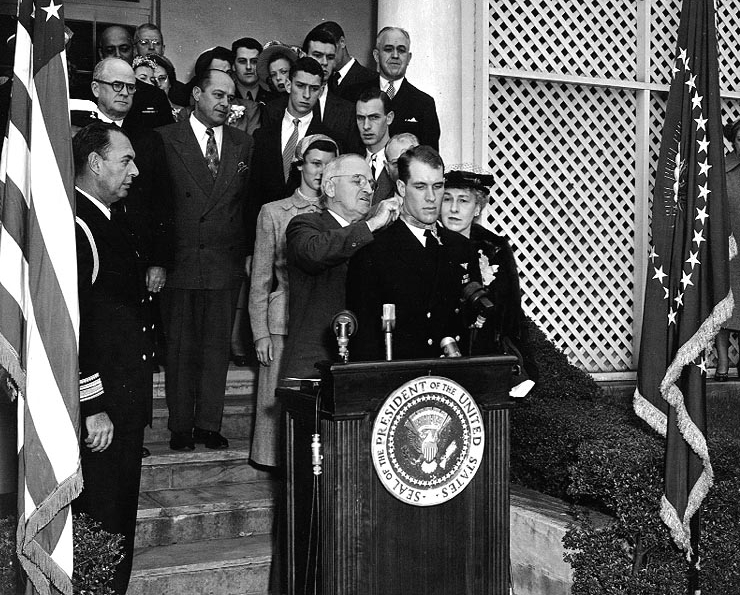
Hudner receives the Medal of Honor from President Harry S. Truman on April 13, 1951.

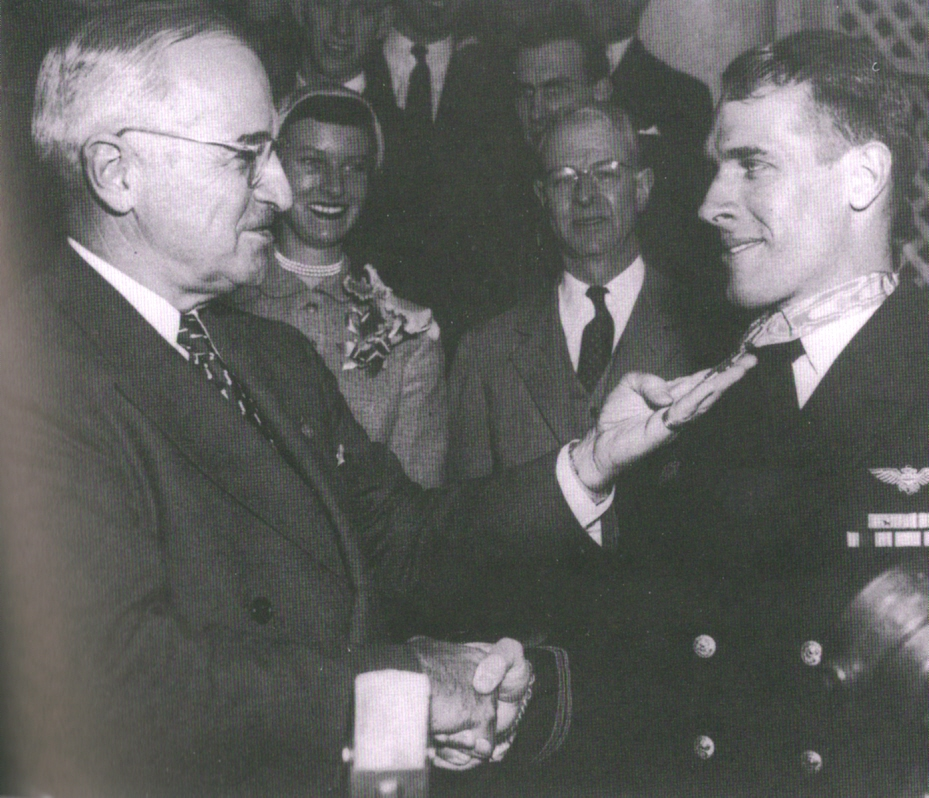
Truman congratulates Hudner after presenting him with the Medal of Honor.

Hudner was grounded for a month, as he had injured his back in the landing, an injury he later said persisted for 6 to 8 years. He flew 27 combat missions during the war, serving there until January 20, 1951, when Leyte was rotated back to the Atlantic Fleet. On April 13, 1951, Hudner received the Medal of Honor from President Harry S. Truman, meeting Brown's widow, Daisy Brown, in the process. The two stayed in regular contact for at least 50 years following this meeting. He was the first service member to receive the medal during the Korean War, though several others would receive the medal for actions which occurred before December 4, 1950. (Note: The first chronological Medal of Honor award was to George D. Libby for actions during the Battle of Taejon on July 19, 1950.)

Hudner said he was occasionally criticized for his actions, and that "about 90" people had told him he acted recklessly. His commanders noted his actions may have endangered the helicopter pilot and sacrificed an aircraft, criticisms Hudner later said did not make him regret his decision, as he felt it was a spur-of-the-moment action. Still, commanders later issued orders forbidding pilots from crash-landing in a similar way to try to save downed wingmen. On later reflection, Hudner indicated he did not consider himself a hero for his actions.

=== Later Navy career ===
After receiving the Medal of Honor, Hudner was transferred to the United States and served as a flight instructor at Naval Air Station Corpus Christi in Texas in 1952 and 1953. Following this, he served as a staff officer for Carrier Division 3, which at the time was part of Task Force 77 and operating around Japan, in 1953 and 1954. In 1955 and 1956, he served in Air Development Squadron 3 at Naval Air Station Atlantic City in New Jersey, where he flew developmental and experimental aircraft. During this time, he was trained on jet engine-powered aircraft.

Beginning in October 1957, Hudner served in an exchange program with the U.S. Air Force, flying for two years with the 60th Fighter-Interceptor Squadron at Otis Air Force Base in Barnstable County, Massachusetts. During this assignment, he flew the F-94 Starfire and the F-101 Voodoo. He was then promoted to commander and served as aide to the Chief of the Bureau of Naval Weapons until 1962, when he attended the Air War College at Maxwell Air Force Base in Montgomery, Alabama. Upon graduating in July 1963, he returned to flying duty and was appointed the executive officer of Fighter Squadron 53, flying the F-8E Crusader aboard USS Ticonderoga. After serving as executive officer, Hudner assumed command of VF-53. Following this assignment, he was transferred to a position as Leadership Training Officer at the office of Commander, Naval Air Forces, at Naval Air Station North Island in Coronado, California.

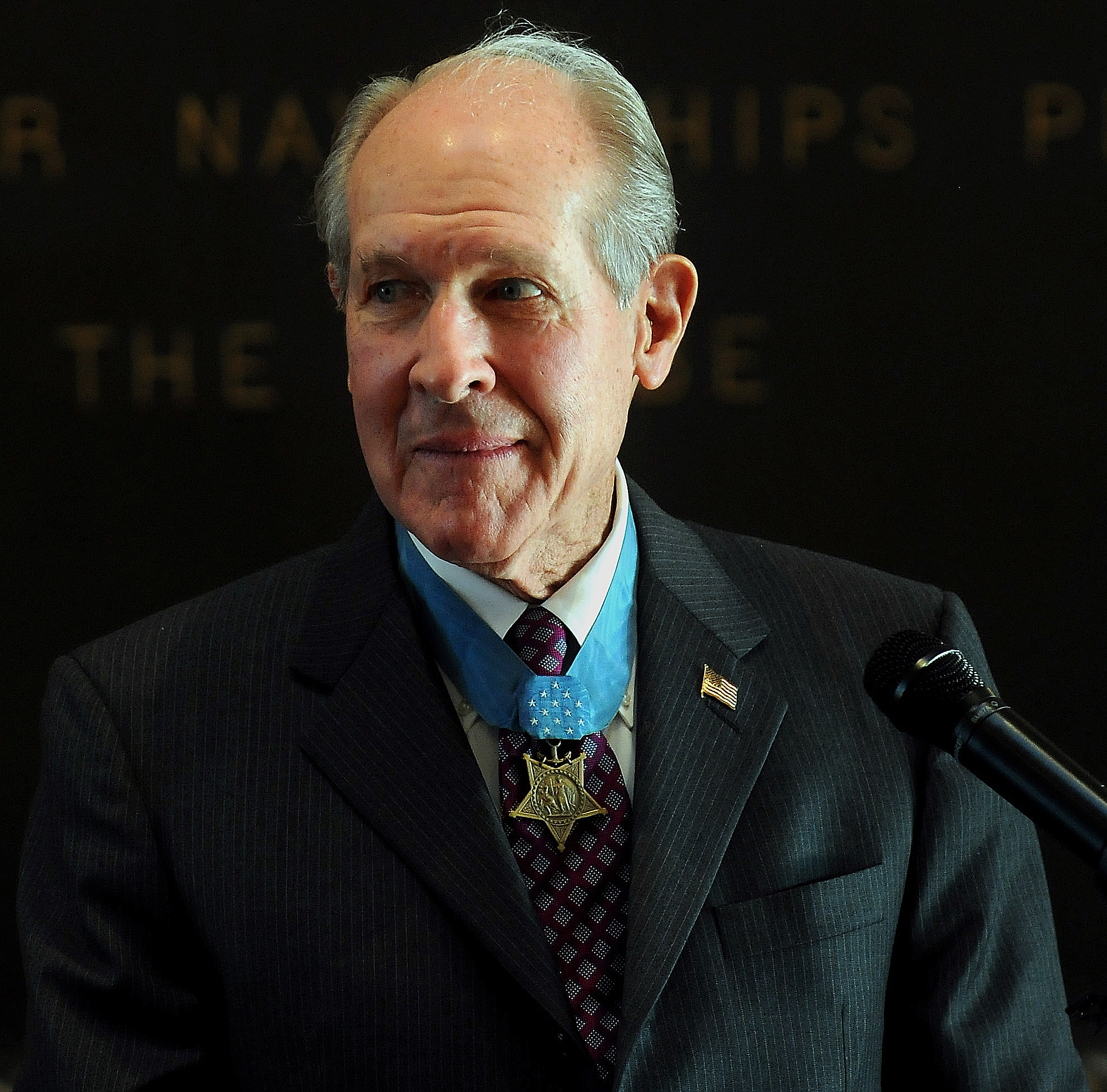
Hudner at the U.S. Naval Academy in December 2008

Hudner was promoted to captain in 1965, taking command of Training Squadron 24 at Naval Air Station Chase Field in Bee County, Texas, which he commanded in 1965 and 1966. In 1966 he was assigned to USS Kitty Hawk, first as navigator, then as the ship's executive officer. Kitty Hawk deployed off the shore of South Vietnam in 1966 and 1967, launching missions in support of the Vietnam War, and he served on the ship during this tour but saw no combat and flew none of the missions himself. In 1968, he was assigned as the operations officer for the Southeast Asia Air Operations division of the U.S. Navy. That year, he married Georgea Smith, a widow with three children, whom he had met in San Diego. The two had one son together, Thomas Jerome Hudner III, born in 1971. Hudner's final Navy posting was as the head of Aviation Technical Training in the Office of the Chief of Naval Operations in Washington, D.C., a post which he held until his retirement in February 1973.

On February 17, 1973, days before Hudner's retirement, the Navy commissioned the Knox-class frigate USS Jesse L. Brown, the third U.S. ship to be named in honor of an African American. Present at the commissioning ceremony in Boston, Massachusetts, were Daisy Brown Thorne, who had remarried, her daughter Pamela Brown, and Hudner, who gave a dedication. The ship was decommissioned on July 27, 1994, and sold to Egypt.

== Later life and death ==
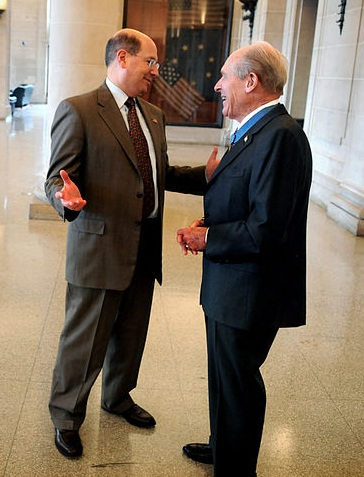
Hudner (right) speaking with Secretary of the Navy Donald C. Winter at the U.S. Naval Academy in December 2008.

After retiring, Hudner initially worked as a management consultant, and later worked with the United Service Organizations. Because of his Medal of Honor, he worked regularly with various veterans groups in his retirement as a leader in the veterans' community, otherwise living a quiet life. From 1991 to 1999, he served as Commissioner for the Massachusetts Department of Veterans' Services, until he gave up that position to Thomas G. Kelley, another Medal of Honor recipient.

He received a number of honors in his later life. In 1989, he was honored by the Gathering of Eagles Program of the Air Force at Maxwell Air Force Base. In 2001, Hudner presented Daisy Brown Thorne with several of Jesse Brown's posthumous medals at Mississippi State University. In May 2012, the Secretary of the Navy announced that an Arleigh Burke-class guided missile destroyer would be named USS Thomas Hudner. The ship was christened on April 1, 2017, with Hudner in attendance, and commissioned in Boston on December 1, 2018.

After 1991, Hudner lived in Concord, Massachusetts, with his wife, Georgea. In July 2013, he visited Pyongyang, North Korea, in an attempt to recover Jesse Brown's remains from the crash site. He was told by North Korean authorities to return in September when the weather would be more predictable.

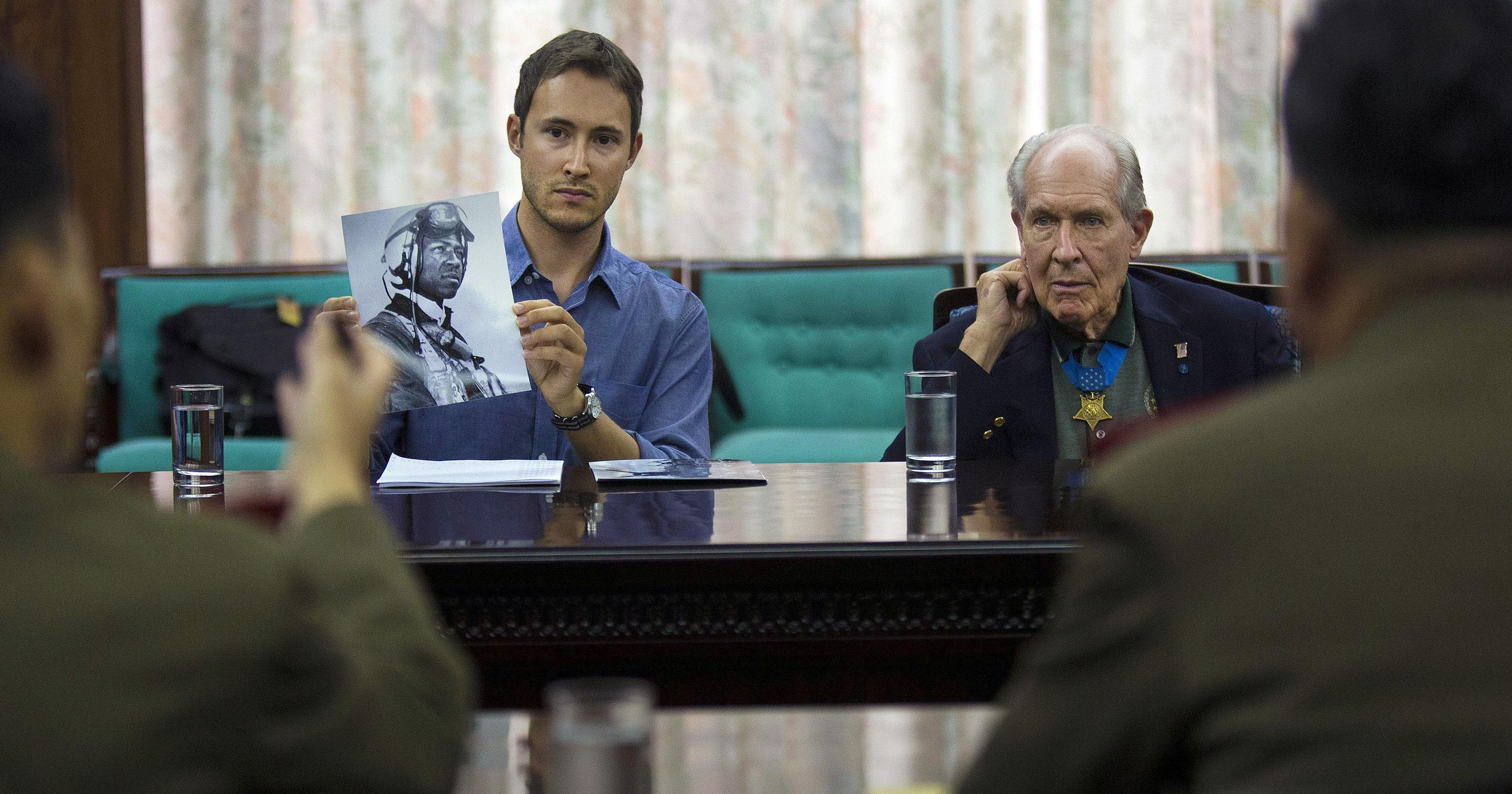
Author Adam Makos negotiating with North Korean officials for the retrieval of Jesse L. Brown remains. Makos was the author of the biography featuring the two men published in 2015.

Hudner's official biography—Devotion: An Epic Story of Heroism, Friendship, and Sacrifice—was released in October 2015, after seven years of collaboration with author Adam Makos.

Hudner died at his home in Concord on November 13, 2017, at the age of 93. He was interred at Arlington National Cemetery on April 4, 2018, in a ceremony attended by General Joseph Dunford, Chairman of the Joint Chiefs of Staff.

Hudner is portrayed by Glen Powell in the 2022 film Devotion.

== Medal of Honor citation ==
Hudner was one of 11 men awarded the Medal of Honor during the Battle of Chosin Reservoir. He was the first of seven U.S. Navy servicemen, and one of the two Naval aviators, to be awarded the Medal of Honor in the Korean War.

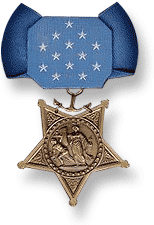

For conspicuous gallantry and intrepidity at the risk of his life above and beyond the call of duty as a pilot in Fighter Squadron 32, while attempting to rescue a squadron mate whose plane struck by antiaircraft fire and trailing smoke, was forced down behind enemy lines. Quickly maneuvering to circle the downed pilot and protect him from enemy troops infesting the area, Lt. (J. G.) Hudner risked his life to save the injured flier who was trapped alive in the burning wreckage. Fully aware of the extreme danger in landing on the rough mountainous terrain and the scant hope of escape or survival in subzero temperature, he put his plane down skillfully in a deliberate wheels-up landing in the presence of enemy troops. With his bare hands, he packed the fuselage with snow to keep the flames away from the pilot and struggled to pull him free. Unsuccessful in this, he returned to his crashed aircraft and radioed other airborne planes, requesting that a helicopter be dispatched with an ax and fire extinguisher. He then remained on the spot despite the continuing danger from enemy action and, with the assistance of the rescue pilot, renewed a desperate but unavailing battle against time, cold, and flames. Lt. (J. G.) Hudner's exceptionally valiant action and selfless devotion to a shipmate sustain and enhance the highest traditions of the U.S. Naval Service.

== Awards and Decorations ==

| Badge | Naval Aviator Badge | | |
| 1st row | Medal of Honor | Legion of Merit | Bronze Star Medal |
| 2nd row | Air Medal with 5/16 inch star | Navy Commendation Medal | Navy Presidential Unit Citation |
| 3rd row | Navy Unit Commendation | American Campaign Medal | World War II Victory Medal |
| 4th row | Navy Occupation Service Medal | National Defense Service Medal with 1 Service star | Korean Service Medal with 2 Campaign stars |
| 5th row | Vietnam Service Medal with 1 Campaign star | Korean Presidential Unit Citation | RVN Gallantry Cross Unit Citation with Palm |
| 6th row | Korean Presidential Unit Citation | United Nations Service Medal Korea | Korean War Service Medal Retroactively Awarded, 2003 |

Order of Military Merit

Taeguk Cordon Medal

== In film and literature ==
- Film: Devotion (2022)
- Book: Devotion: An Epic Story of Heroism, Friendship, and Sacrifice (2015)

== See also ==
- List of Korean War Medal of Honor recipients

== Citations ==
=== Sources ===
- Alexander, Bevin (2003), Korea: The First War We Lost, New York City, New York: Hippocrene Books, ISBN 978-0-7818-1019-7
- Appleman, Roy E. (1998), South to the Naktong, North to the Yalu: United States Army in the Korean War, Washington, D.C.: Department of the Army, ISBN 978-0-16-001918-0, archived from the original on February 7, 2014
- Collier, Peter; Del Calzo, Nick (2006), Medal of Honor: Portraits of Valor Beyond the Call of Duty, New York City, New York: Workman Publishing Company, ISBN 978-1-57965-462-7
- Dwight, Margaret L.; Sewell, George A. (2009), Mississippi Black History Makers, Oxford, Mississippi: University Press of Mississippi, ISBN 978-1-60473-390-7
- Ecker, Richard E. (2004), Battles of the Korean War: A Chronology, with Unit-by-Unit United States Casualty Figures & Medal of Honor Citations, Jefferson, North Carolina: McFarland & Company, ISBN 978-0-7864-1980-7
- Fannin, Caroline M.; Gubert, Betty Kaplan; Sawyer, Miriam (2001), Distinguished African Americans in Aviation and Space Science, Westport, Connecticut: Greenwood Press, ISBN 978-1-57356-246-1
- Malkasian, Carter (2001), The Korean War, Oxford, United Kingdom: Osprey Publishing, ISBN 978-1-84176-282-1
- Smith, Larry (2004), Beyond Glory: Medal of Honor Heroes in Their Own Words, New York City, New York: W. W. Norton & Company, ISBN 978-0-393-32562-1
- Taylor, Theodore (2007), Flight of Jesse Leroy Brown, Annapolis, Maryland: Naval Institute Press, ISBN 978-1-59114-852-4
- Tillman, Barrett (2002), Above and Beyond: The Aviation Medals of Honor, Washington, D.C.: Smithsonian Institution, ISBN 978-1-58834-056-6
- Varhola, Michael J. (2000), Fire and Ice: The Korean War, 1950–1953, Mason City, Iowa: Da Capo Press, ISBN 978-1-882810-44-4
- Williams, Albert E. (2003), Black Warriors: Unique Units and Individuals, Haverford, Pennsylvania: Infinity Publishing, ISBN 978-0-7414-1525-7

Online sources

- Sherman, Tanya (2011), Thomas J. Hudner Jr., Phillips Academy, archived from the original on April 5, 2012
- Steele, Jeanette (May 7, 2012), "Ship named for living Korean War hero and Navy pilot", San Diego Union Tribune
- Gathering of Eagles Biography: Thomas J. Hudner Jr., Montgomery, Alabama: United States Air Force, 1989, archived from the original on December 23, 2011
- "Secretary of The Navy Announces DDG 116 to be Named Thomas Hudner", Office of the Assistant Secretary of Defense (Public Affairs), U.S. Department of Defense, May 7, 2012, archived from the original on October 25, 2012
- Captain Thomas J. Hudner Jr., USN, United States Navy, June 21, 2000, archived from the original on September 16, 2012
- Korean Service Medal, United States Navy, archived from the original on January 23, 2012
