= VF-53 =

Fighter Squadron 53
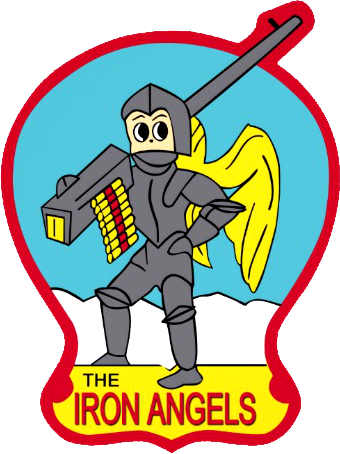
- VF-53 squadron insignia
- Active: 20 July 1950 – 29 January 1971
- Country: United States
- Branch: United States Navy
- Role: Fighter aircraft
- Part of: Inactive
- Nickname(s): Iron Angels
- Engagements: Korean War; Vietnam War

Aircraft flown
- Fighter: F-9F-2 Panther; F2H-3 Banshee; F4D-1 Skyray; F3H Demon; F-8 Crusader

Fighter Squadron 53, or VF-53 Iron Angels was an aviation unit of the United States Navy in service from 20 July 1950 to 29 January 1971. Originally established as reserve squadron VF-721 on 20 July 1950, it was redesignated as VF-141 on 4 February 1953 and then redesignated as VF-53 on 15 October 1963. The squadron was disestablished on 29 January 1971. It was the fourth US Navy squadron to be designated as VF-53.

== Operational history ==
=== Korean War ===
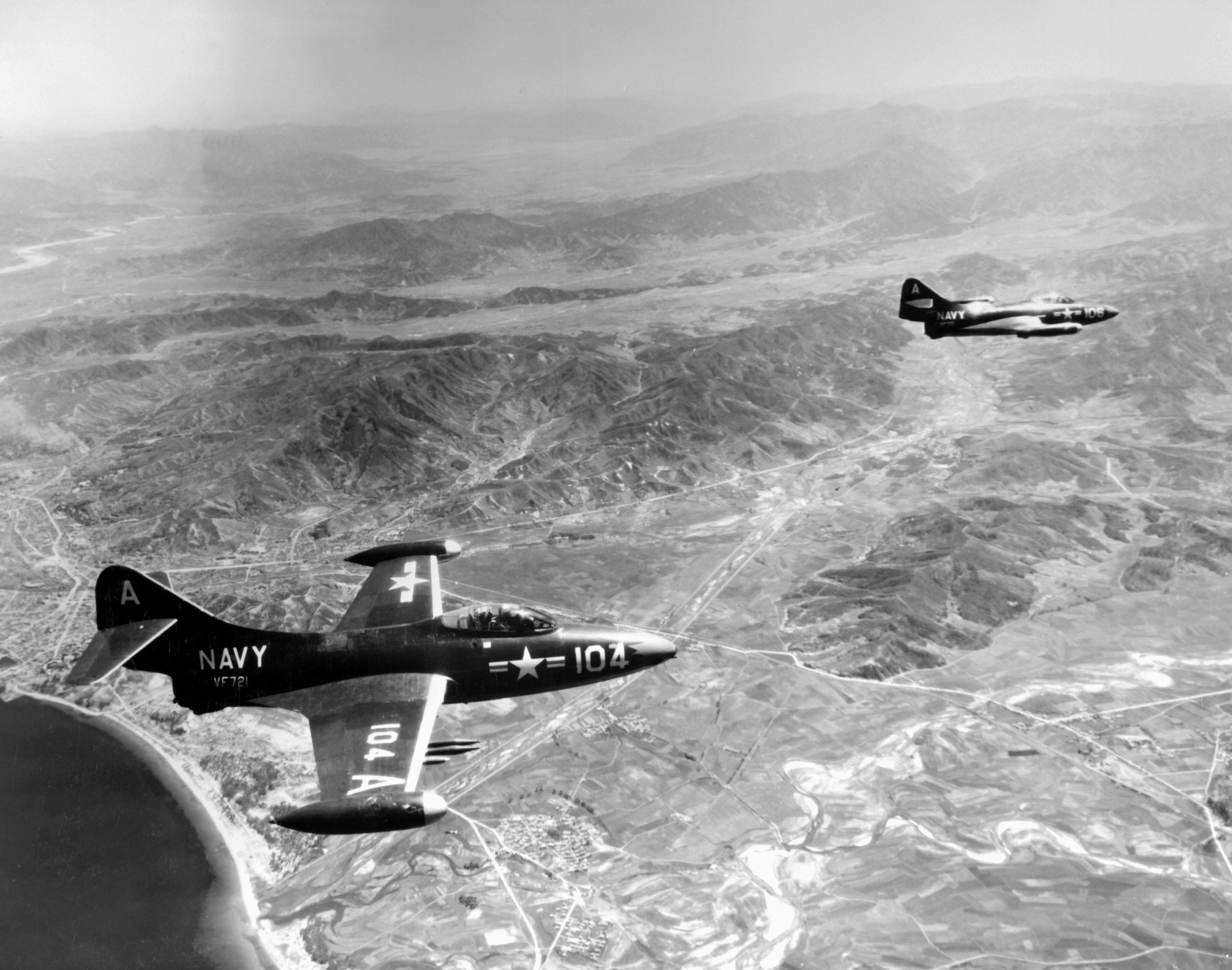
VF-721 F-9F-2 Panthers over Korea in 1951

VF-721 equipped with the F9F-2 Panther was assigned to Carrier Air Group 101 (CVG-101) aboard USS Boxer for a deployment to Korea from 2 March to 24 October 1951. During this deployment the squadron lost 2 aircraft.

The squadron deployed on USS Kearsarge from 11 August 1952 to 17 March 1953. During this deployment the squadron lost 4 aircraft and two pilots killed.

=== 1950s-60s ===
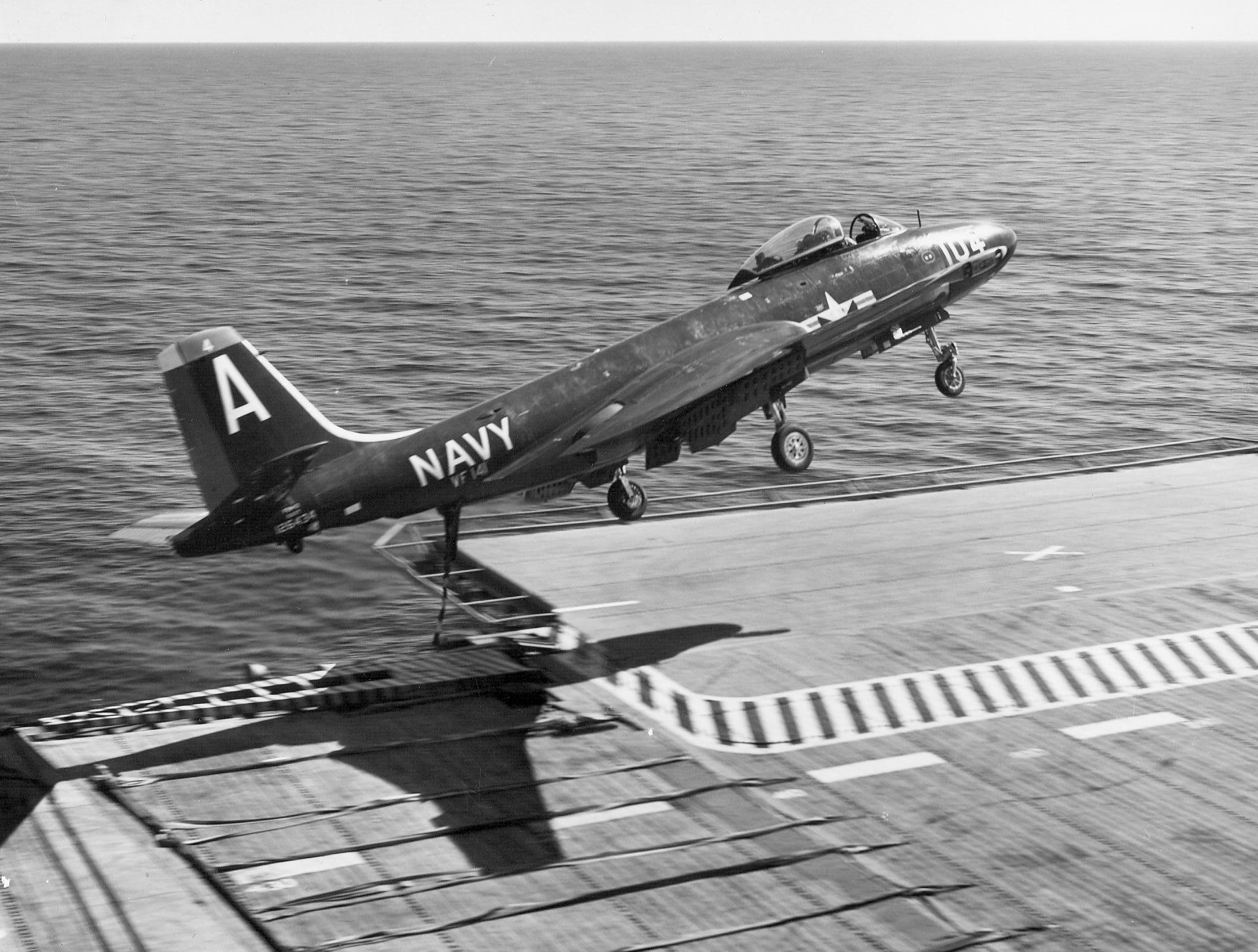
VF-141 F2H-3 Banshee aborts a landing on USS Randolph in 1954

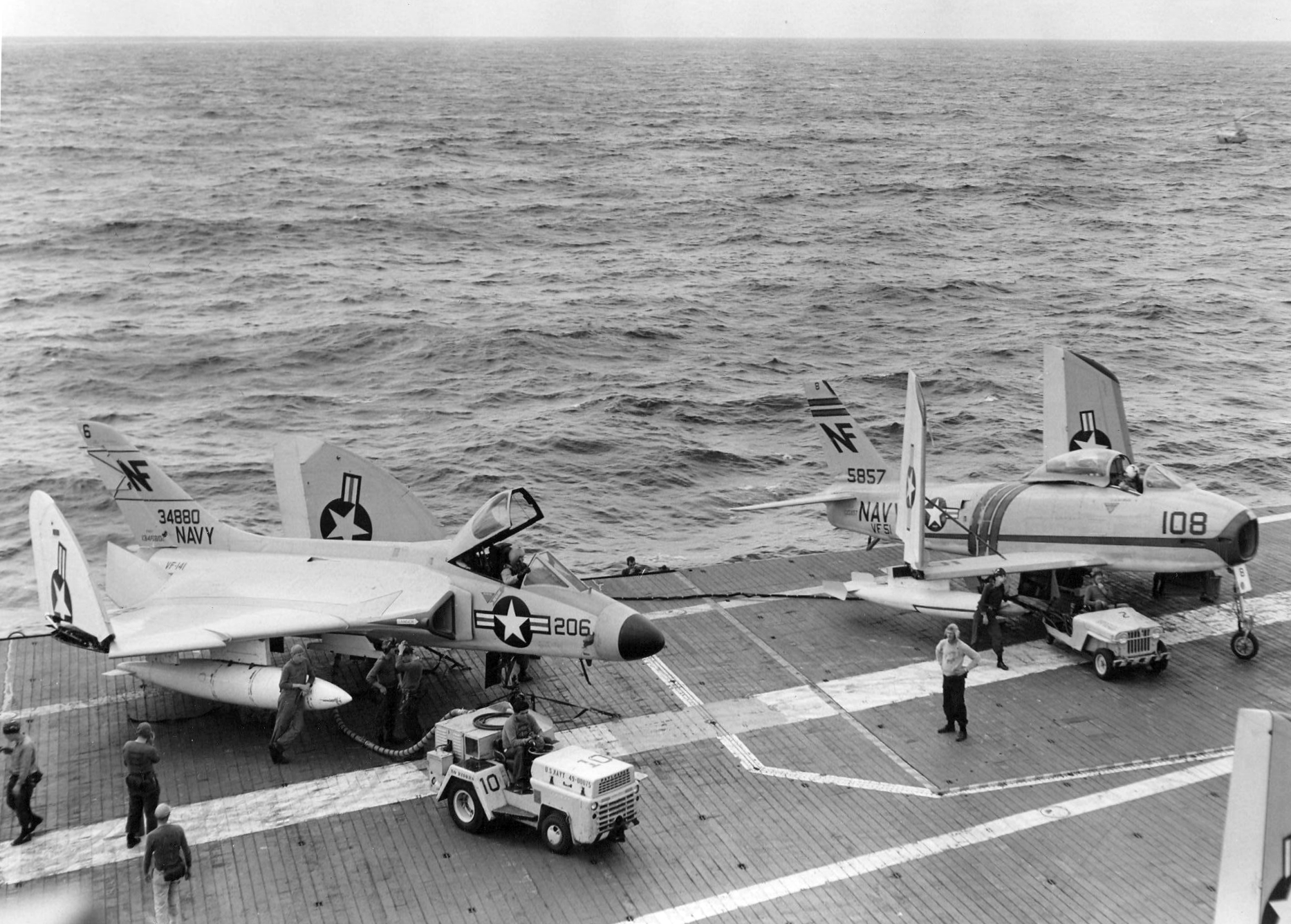
VF-141 F4D-1 Skyray and VF-51 FJ-3 on USS Bon Homme Richard in 1957

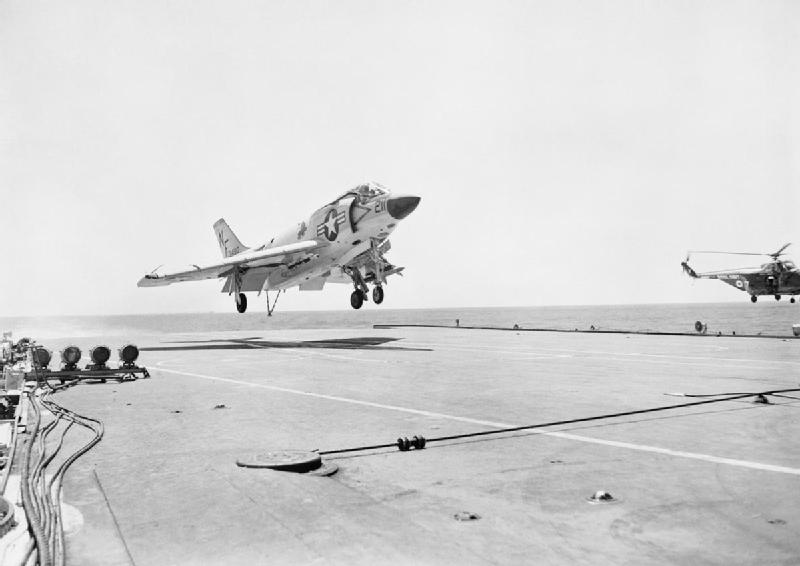
VF-141 F3H Demon landing on HMS Victorious (R38) in 1961

VF-141 equipped with the F2H-3 Banshee was assigned to Carrier Air Group 14 (CVG-14) aboard USS Randolph for a deployment to the Mediterranean from 3 February to 6 August 1954.

VF-141 equipped with the F4D-1 Skyray was assigned to Carrier Air Group 5 (CVG-5) aboard USS Bon Homme Richard for a deployment to the Western Pacific from 12 July to 9 December 1957. The squadron was assigned to Carrier Air Group 14 (CVG-14) aboard USS Ranger for a deployment to the Western Pacific from 3 January to 27 July 1959.

VF-141 equipped with the F3H Demon was assigned to CVG-14 for a deployment to the Western Pacific aboard USS Oriskany from 14 May to 15 December 1960. The squadron deployed aboard USS Lexington for a deployment to the Western Pacific from 9 November 1961 to 12 May 1962.

=== Vietnam ===
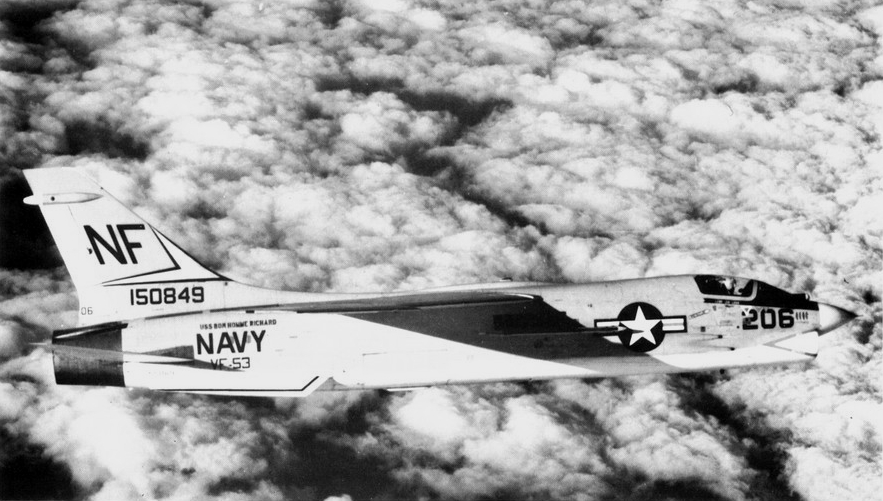
VF-53 F-8J Crusader in 1970

VF-53 was assigned to Carrier Air Wing 5 (CVW-5) and was deployed to Vietnamese waters aboard USS Ticonderoga three times: 3 January to 15 July 1963; 14 April to 15 December 1964 and 28 September 1965 to 13 May 1966.

VF-53 was deployed on the carrier USS Hancock from 5 January to 22 July 1967. On 25 March 1967, a squadron F-8E crashed at sea on a non-combat mission, the pilot Lieutenant j.g. James Hise was killed in action, body not recovered.

VF-53 was deployed on the carrier USS Bon Homme Richard three times: from 27 January to 10 October 1968; from 18 March to 29 October 1969 and from 2 April to 12 November 1970. On 29 July 1968, LCDR Guy Kane flying an F-8E shot down a Vietnam People's Air Force MiG-17.

== Home port assignments ==
- NAS Glenview NAS Miramar

== Notable former members ==
- Thomas J. Hudner Jr.

== See also ==
- History of the United States Navy
- List of inactive United States Navy aircraft squadrons
- List of United States Navy aircraft squadrons
