= USS Ramage =

American guided missile destroyer

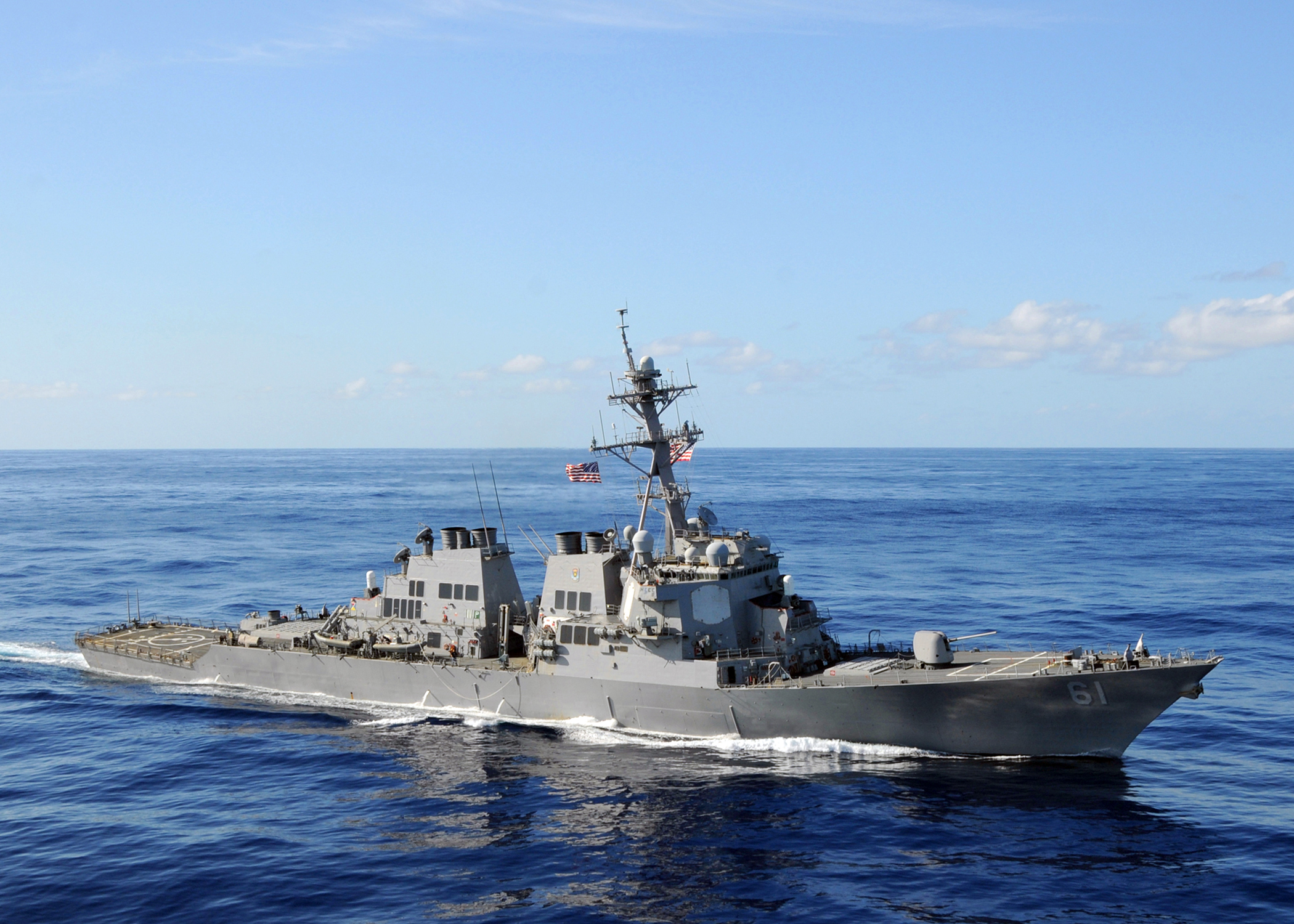
- USS Ramage on 6 September 2008

History

United States
- Name: Ramage
- Namesake: Lawson P. Ramage
- Ordered: 21 February 1990
- Builder: Ingalls Shipbuilding
- Laid down: 4 January 1993
- Launched: 1 February 1994
- Commissioned: 22 July 1995
- Home port: Mayport
- Identification: MMSI number: 366995000; Callsign: NRED; Hull number: DDG-61
- Motto: Par Excellence
- Honors and awards: See Awards
- Status: in active service
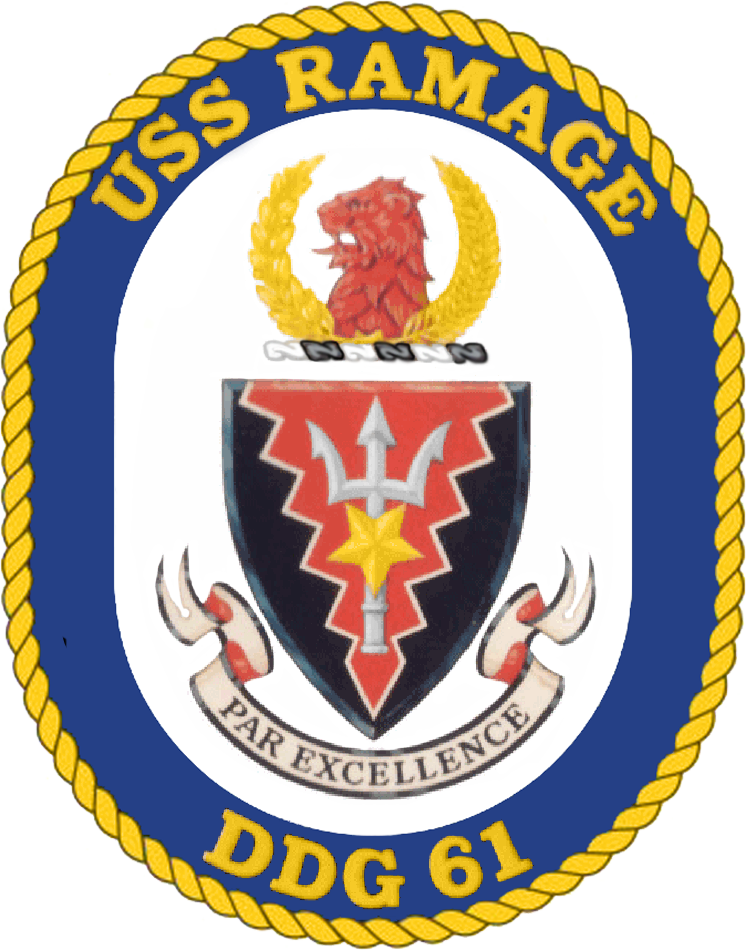
- Badge

General characteristics
- Class & type: Arleigh Burke-class destroyer
- Displacement: Light: approx. 6,800 long tons (6,900 t); Full: approx. 8,900 long tons (9,000 t)
- Length: 505 ft (154 m)
- Beam: 59 ft (18 m)
- Draft: 31 ft (9.4 m)
- Propulsion: 2 × shafts
- Speed: In excess of 30 kn (56 km/h; 35 mph)
- Range: 4,400 nmi (8,100 km; 5,100 mi) at 20 kn (37 km/h; 23 mph)
- Complement: 33 commissioned officers; 38 chief petty officers; 210 enlisted personnel
- Sensors & processing systems: AN/SPY-1D PESA 3D radar (Flight I, II, IIA); AN/SPY-6(V)1 AESA 3D radar (Flight III); AN/SPS-67(V)3 or (V)5 surface search radar (DDG-51 – DDG-118); AN/SPQ-9B surface search radar (DDG-119 onward); AN/SPS-73(V)12 surface search/navigation radar (DDG-51 – DDG-86); BridgeMaster E surface search/navigation radar (DDG-87 onward); 3 × AN/SPG-62 fire-control radar; Mk 46 optical sight system (Flight I, II, IIA); Mk 20 electro-optical sight system (Flight III); AN/SQQ-89 ASW combat system: AN/SQS-53C sonar array; AN/SQR-19 tactical towed array sonar (Flight I, II, IIA); TB-37U multi-function towed array sonar (DDG-113 onward); AN/SQQ-28 LAMPS III shipboard system
- Electronic warfare & decoys: AN/SLQ-32 electronic warfare suite; AN/SLQ-25 Nixie torpedo countermeasures; Mk 36 Mod 12 decoy launching systems; Mk 53 Nulka decoy launching systems; Mk 59 decoy launching systems
- Armament: Guns: 1 × 5-inch (127 mm)/54 mk 45 mod 1/2 (lightweight gun); 2 × 20 mm (0.8 in) Phalanx CIWS; 2 × 25 mm (0.98 in) Mk 38 machine gun system; 4 × 0.50 inches (12.7 mm) caliber guns; Missiles: 2 × Mk 141 Harpoon anti-ship missile launcher; 1 × 29-cell, 1 × 61-cell (90 total cells) Mk 41 vertical launching system (VLS): RIM-66M surface-to-air missile; RIM-156 surface-to-air missile; RIM-161 anti-ballistic missile; BGM-109 Tomahawk cruise missile; RUM-139 vertical launch ASROC; Torpedoes: 2 × Mark 32 triple torpedo tubes: Mark 46 lightweight torpedo; Mark 50 lightweight torpedo; Mark 54 lightweight torpedo
- Aircraft carried: 1 × Sikorsky MH-60R

USS Ramage (DDG-61) is an Arleigh Burke-class (Flight I) Aegis guided missile destroyer of the United States Navy. The ship is named for Vice Admiral Lawson P. Ramage, a notable submarine commander and Medal of Honor recipient in World War II.

Ramage was laid down 4 January 1993 at the Ingalls Shipbuilding in Pascagoula, Mississippi, launched 11 February 1994, sponsored by Barbara Ramage (wife of the admiral), and commissioned 22 July 1995.

== Construction ==
Ramage was constructed utilizing efficient modular shipbuilding techniques pioneered by Ingalls in the 1970s and enhanced in recent years through the development of Product-Oriented Shipbuilding Technology (POST).

These innovative techniques allow a large ship, such as Ramage, to be built in three separate hull and superstructure modules and later joined to form the complete ship. Heavy machinery, such as propulsion equipment, as well as piping, duct work, and electrical cabling were installed in hundreds of sub-assemblies, which were joined to form dozens of assemblies. These assemblies were then joined to form the three hull modules. The ship's superstructure, or "deck house", was lifted atop the mid-body module early in the assembly process.

Ramage's launching was as unique as her construction. The ship was moved over land via Ingalls' wheel-on-rail transfer system and onto the shipyard's launch and recovery drydock. The drydock was ballasted down, and DDG-61 floated free on 11 February 1994. She was then moved to her outfitting dock in preparation for the traditional christening ceremony and completion of outfitting and testing.

== Service history ==
=== 1996–2000 ===
On 25 November 1996, Ramage embarked on her maiden deployment to the Mediterranean Sea. Ramage visited six countries and made 16 port calls. Ramage was awarded the Meritorious Unit Commendation ribbon, the Sea Service Ribbon, and the Armed Forces Service Medal during this deployment.

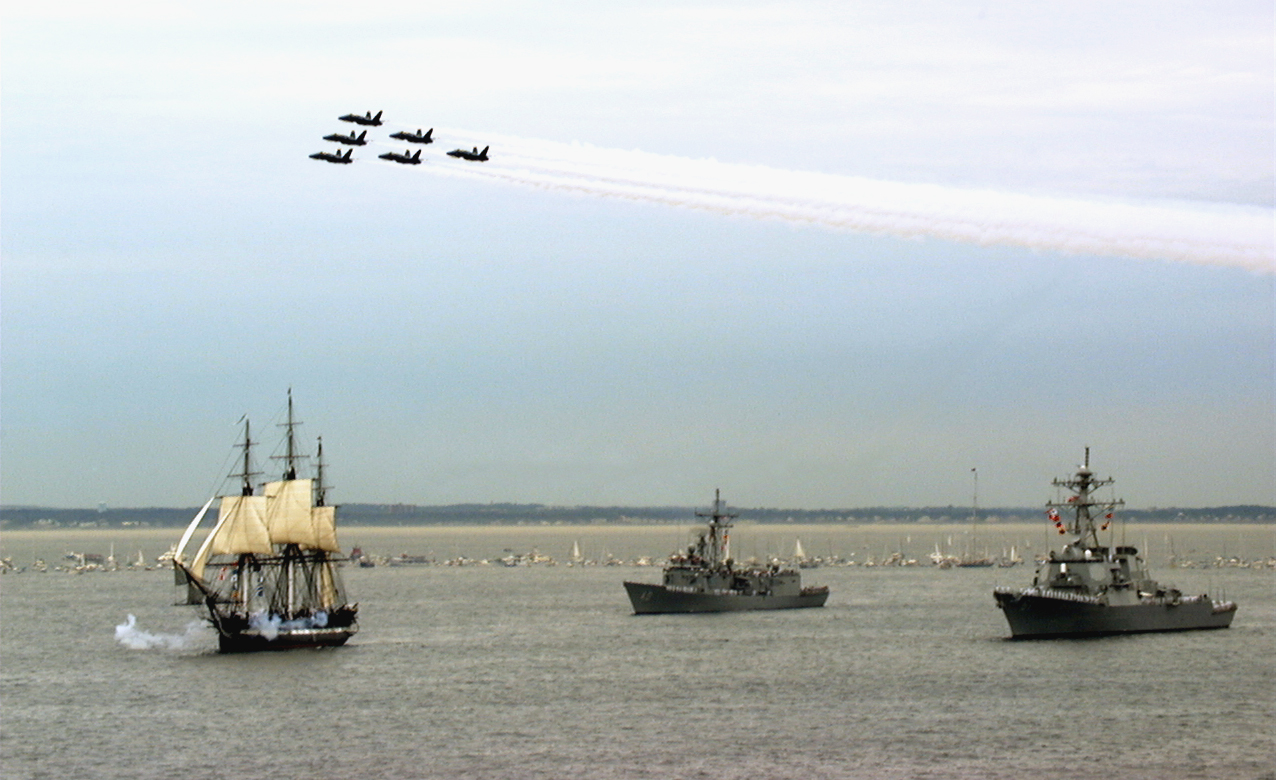
USS Ramage, along with USS Halyburton, assists the USS Constitution as it sails unassisted for the first time in 116 years, 21 July 1997.

In March 1997 Ramage provided logistic and communications support for Marines in Albania during Operation Silver Wake. On 21 July 1997, Ramage was an escort of the museum ship USS Constitution when she set sail in Massachusetts Bay.

On 24 May 1999, as a member of the Theodore Roosevelt Battle Group, Ramage departed on her second deployment to the Mediterranean and Arabian Seas, MED/MEF 2–99. While deployed overseas, Ramage visited eight countries and made 15 port visits. Ramage also participated in Operation Allied Force off the coast of Montenegro.

=== 2001–2010 ===
Following the 11 September 2001 attacks, Ramage sortied to the waters off the East Coast of the United States where she provided extended radar coverage of the New York City and the surrounding area in the wake of the terrorist attacks.

Ramage deployed with the George Washington Surface Strike Group to the Arabian Sea in support of Operation Enduring Freedom. During this deployment Ramage participated in multi-national exercises Neo Tapon 04 and Iron Siren 04.

Ramage again deployed to the Persian Gulf in support of the global war on terrorism in October 2006. While on station Ramage participated in Operations Argos Asterion and Argos Declion. Ramage was also the first ship to respond to the Horn of Africa during the Ethiopian and Somali hostilities of late December 2006 providing extended coordination for P-3 coverage of the events. Ramage visited eight countries and conducted ten port calls.

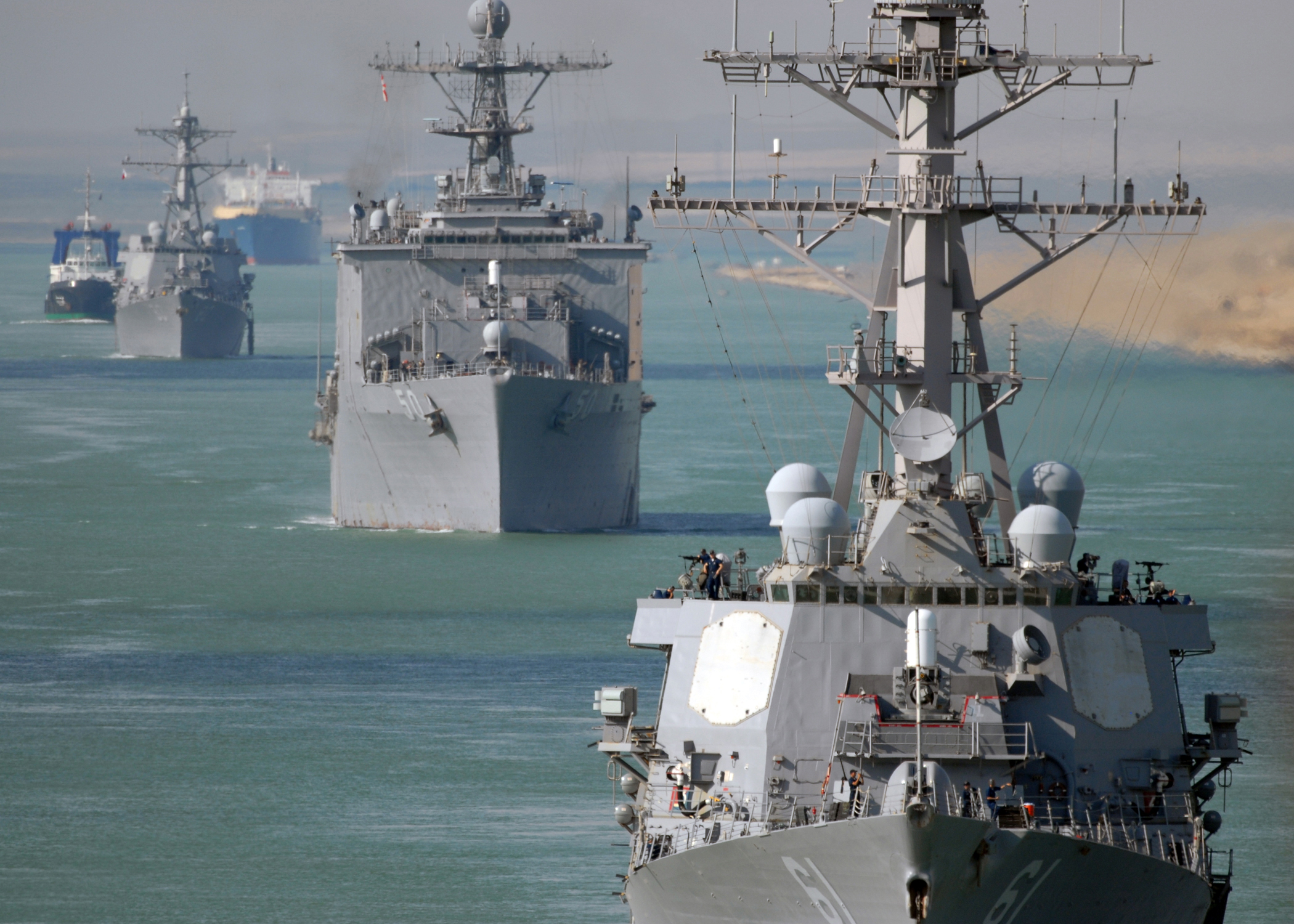
USS Ramage leads USS Carter Hall and USS Roosevelt in the Suez Canal, 23 September 2008.

In August 2008 Ramage departed for a seven-month deployment in the Persian Gulf with the Iwo Jima Expeditionary Strike Group. Ramage participated in multi-national Operation Red Reef and Focused Operation Trident Knight. Ramage returned to home port in April 2009 after visiting four countries and making six port calls.

Ramage departed for the North Sea and Baltic Sea to participate in Exercise Joint Warrior 09 in September 2009. Ramage operated with HMS Illustrious and many other multi-national naval units. After making five ports of call in four countries, Ramage returned in November 2009. On 28 October 2009 while pierside at Gdynia, Poland after participating in a Joint Warrior exercise, a sailor on the ship conducting maintenance accidentally discharged one of the ship's M240 machine guns into the port city. Two rounds from the gun's three-round burst hit a warehouse, causing no injuries, the third round was not recovered. Local police allowed the ship to depart as originally scheduled later that day after questioning the ship's crew.

Ramage departed on deployment to the Mediterranean Sea on 5 January 2010. In late January 2010, Ramage was dispatched to the Mediterranean Sea to assist with the search-and-rescue effort in the wake of the crash of Ethiopian Airlines Flight 409. Ramage also provided Ballistic Missile Defense to the Eastern Mediterranean during this deployment. Ramage's port visits included: Naples, Italy; Haifa, Israel; Kuşadası, Bodrum, and Aksaz, Turkey; Limassol, Cyprus; Rhodes, Greece; Augusta Bay, Sicily; and Ponta Delgada, Azores. Ramage returned to home port on 6 August 2010.

=== 2011–2020 ===
On 8 August 2013, Ramage departed for an eight-month deployment into the US Navy 6th Fleet area of responsibility to assist with ballistic missile defense. The ship's last deployment was from May 2012 to January 2013.

Ramage entered the eastern Mediterranean Sea as a response to the Syrian Civil War. The destroyer was specifically deployed after allegations that President Bashar al-Assad's regime had used chemical weapons on its own people in suburbs of Damascus. Ramage arrived in the region, according to a defense official, on 23 August 2013. The destroyer was intended to replace USS Mahan, but Mahan remained in area temporarily along with USS Gravely and USS Barry. All four were equipped with cruise missiles. On 28 October 2013, the destroyers Gravely and Ramage answered a distress call from a vessel carrying immigrants located 160 nautical miles (300 km; 180 mi) off the coast of Kalamata, Greece.

In February 2014, Ramage was one of two U.S. Navy ships operating in the Black Sea during the Sochi Olympics. In August 2014, Ramage underwent testing and evaluation at Norfolk Naval Shipyard (NNSY).

In November 2015, Ramage deployed to the US Navy 6th Fleet area of responsibility to assist with ballistic missile defense, and to escort the USS Harry S. Truman carrier strike group. She completed 28 Strait of Hormuz transits throughout the deployment, and returned to her home port of Norfolk, Virginia on 25 July 2016. Following her 2015–2016 deployment, Ramage conducted her mid-cycle upgrade. As a result of the US Navy's new coast-wide shipyard bidding process, she was selected for an unusual "out of home port" yard period, and spent a nine-month period in Pascagoula, Mississippi. Ramage left the yards on time, and returned to Norfolk, Virginia in August 2017 to begin workups for the next deployment.

In October 2018, Ramage received short-notice Presidential tasking, and deployed to the US Navy 4th fleet area of responsibility to provide radar surveillance support for the G-20 summit in Buenos Aires, Argentina. She departed Norfolk, Virginia on 25 August 2018, and returned soon.

In late 2019, Ramage deployed to the US Navy 5th fleet area of responsibility as an independent ballistic missile defense operator. During this time, she was assigned as the flagship for Commander, Task Force 55, in a defensive response to the assassination of Iranian General Qasem Soleimani. She took command of all US Naval surface forces in the 5th fleet area, positioning each ship in a strategic defensive manner.

=== 2021–2023 ===
On 9 August 2023, The Navy announced plans to extend the ship's service life beyond the initial 35 years, intending to keep Ramage in service until at least 2035. On 8 October 2023, the day after the Hamas attack on Israel, the U.S. Secretary of Defense, Lloyd Austin, directed the Gerald R. Ford carrier strike group to the Eastern Mediterranean in response. Along with the carrier, the group also includes the cruiser Normandy, and the destroyers Ramage, Carney, Roosevelt and Thomas Hudner.

=== Awards ===
- Navy Unit Commendation - (Mar-May 1997, Oct 2001-Apr 2002, Oct 2006-May 2007, Nov 2015-Jul 2016)
- Navy Meritorious Unit Commendation - (11-19 Sep 2002, Aug 2013-May 2014)
- Battle "E" - (1995, 1998, 2001, 2002, 2003, 2016, 2019)
