= USS Normandy =

US Navy Ticonderoga-class cruiser

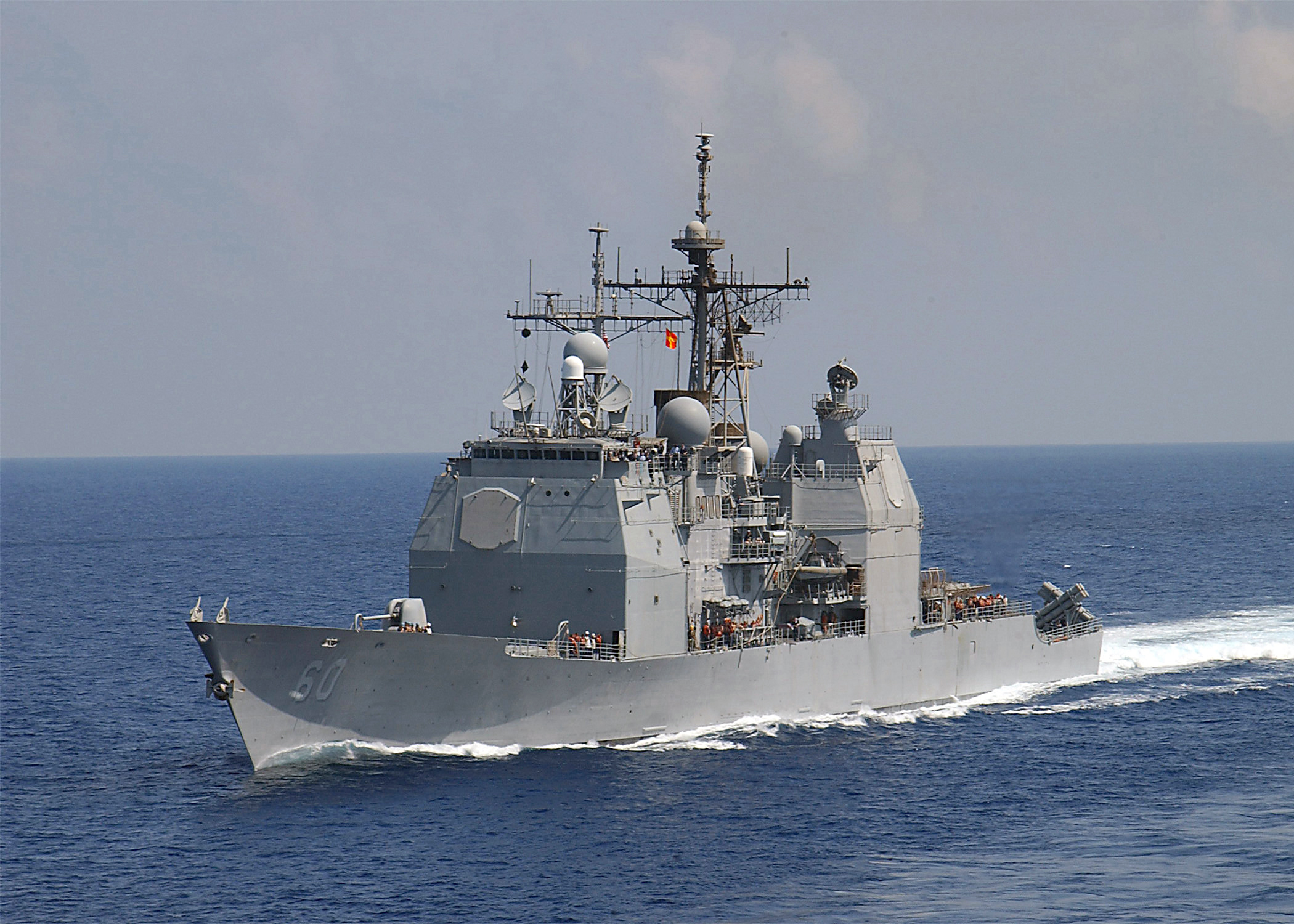
- USS Normandy on 5 June 2005

History

United States
- Name: Normandy
- Namesake: Battle of Normandy; Normandy
- Ordered: 26 November 1984
- Builder: Bath Iron Works
- Laid down: 7 April 1987
- Launched: 19 March 1988
- Commissioned: 9 December 1989
- Decommissioned: 26 September 2025
- Stricken: 26 September 2025
- Identification: Call sign: NVVV; Hull number: CG-60
- Motto: Vanguard of Victory
- Status: Decommissioned
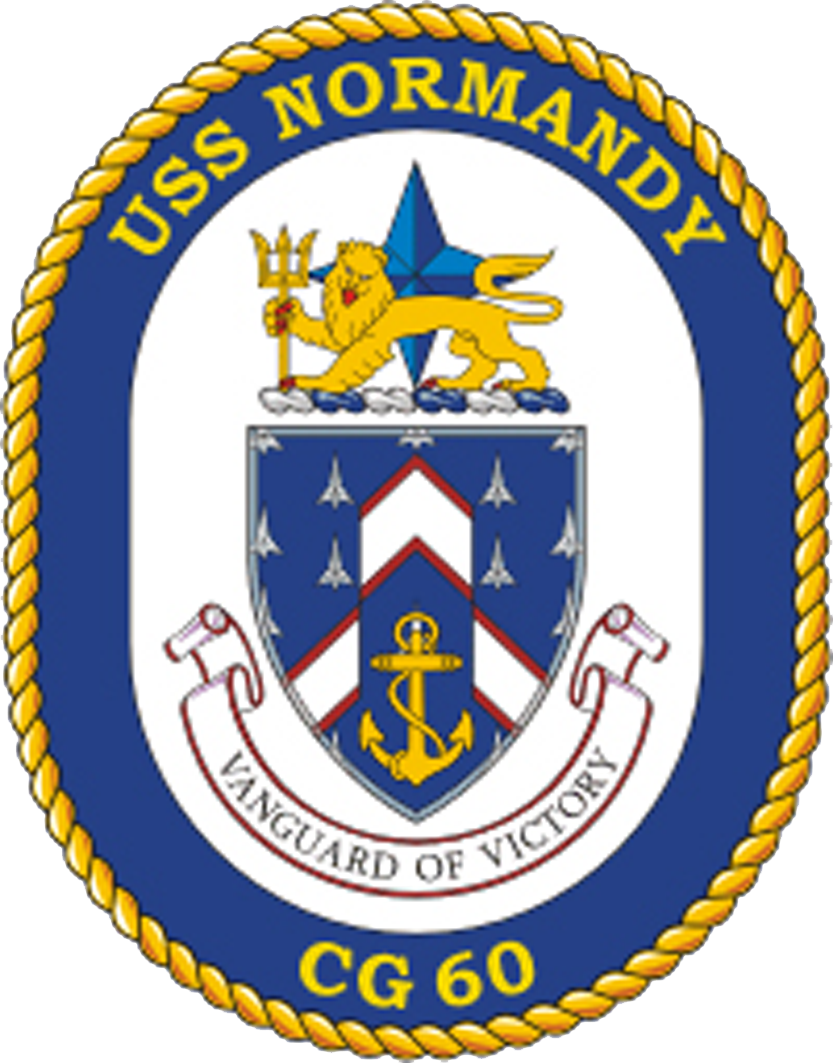
- Badge

General characteristics
- Class & type: Ticonderoga-class guided missile cruiser
- Displacement: Approx. 9,600 long tons (9,800 t) full load
- Length: 567 feet (173 m)
- Beam: 55 feet (16.8 meters)
- Draft: 34 feet (10.2 meters)
- Propulsion: 4 × General Electric LM2500 gas turbine engines; 2 × controllable-reversible pitch propellers; 2 × rudders
- Speed: 32.5 knots (60 km/h; 37.4 mph)
- Boats & landing craft carried: OMAHA (STBD), UTAH (PORT)
- Complement: 30 officers and 300 enlisted
- Sensors & processing systems: AN/SPY-1A/B multi-function radar; AN/SPS-49 air search radar (Removed on some ships); AN/SPG-62 fire control radar; AN/SPS-73 surface search radar; AN/SPQ-9 gun fire control radar; AN/SQQ-89(V)1/3 - A(V)15 Sonar suite, consisting of: AN/SQS-53B/C/D active sonar; AN/SQR-19 TACTAS, AN/SQR-19B ITASS, & MFTA passive sonar; AN/SQQ-28 light airborne multi-purpose system
- Armament: 2 × 61 cell Mk 41 vertical launch systems containing; 122 × mix of: RIM-66M-5 Standard SM-2MR Block IIIB; RIM-156A SM-2ER Block IV; RIM-161 SM-3; RIM-162A ESSM; RIM-174A Standard ERAM; BGM-109 Tomahawk; RUM-139A VL-ASROC; 8 × RGM-84 Harpoon missiles; 2 × 5 in (127 mm)/62 caliber Mark 45 Mod 4 lightweight gun; 2 × Mk 38 25 mm Machine Gun Systems; 2–4 × .50 in (12.7 mm) cal. machine gun; 2 × Phalanx CIWS Block 1B; 2 × Mk 32 12.75 in (324 mm) triple torpedo tubes
- Aircraft carried: 2 × MH-60R Seahawk LAMPS Mk III helicopters.

USS Normandy (CG-60) was a Ticonderoga-class guided-missile cruiser of the United States Navy. Armed with naval guns and anti-air, anti-surface, and anti-submarine missiles, plus other weapons, she was equipped for surface-to-air, surface-to-surface, and anti-submarine warfare. The cruiser was the first US warship since 1945 to go to war on her maiden cruise, and in 1998 was awarded the title "Most Tomahawks shot by a U.S. Navy Cruiser". She is named for the World War II Battle of Normandy, which took place in France on, and following, D-Day.

== Construction ==
Normandy was laid down at Bath Iron Works, Bath, Maine, on 7 April 1987, launched on 19 March 1988, and commissioned on 9 December 1989. Her decommissioning ceremony was 25 September 2025, and she was officially decommissioned on 26 September 2025. She is homeported in Norfolk, Virginia.

== Service history ==
=== Gulf War ===
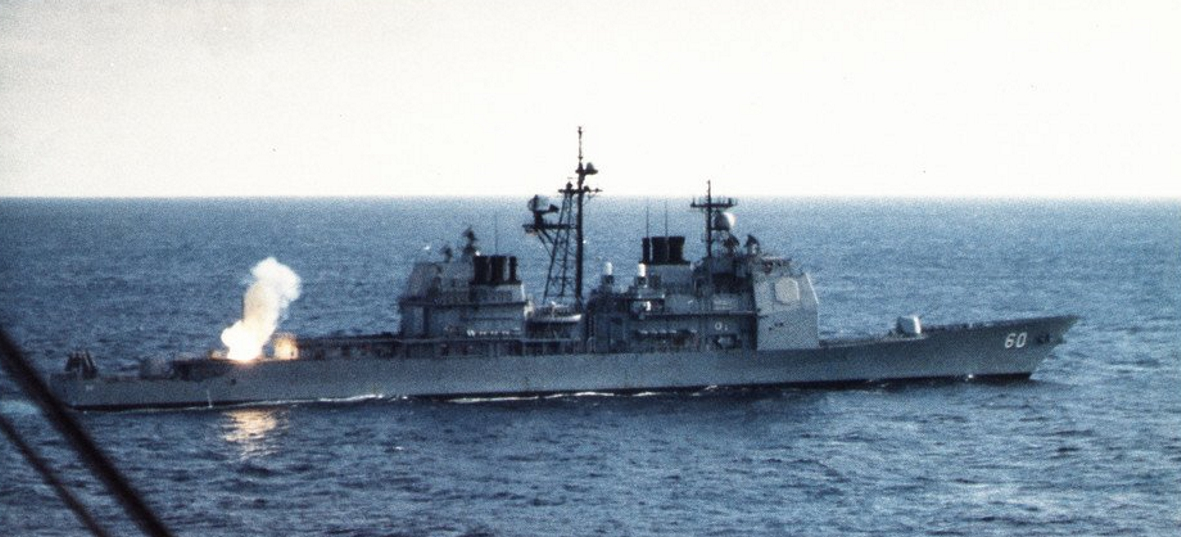
USS Normandy fires Tomahawk missiles during Operation Desert Storm, January 1991.

Just one year after her commissioning in Newport, Rhode Island, Normandy sailed into action in order to support the multinational effort to free Kuwait. Normandy and her crew left on 28 December 1990 to join United Nations forces conducting Operations Desert Shield and Desert Storm. As part of the USS America Battle Group, Normandy transited the Suez Canal and the Red Sea on her way to the Persian Gulf. Normandy fired 26 Tomahawk cruise missiles, protected allied ships and aircraft in the area, conducted maritime interdiction operations, and helped to locate and destroy enemy mines. She was the first US warship since 1945 to go to war on her maiden cruise.

=== Adriatic Operations ===
On 11 August 1995, Normandy and the America Battle Group deployed to the Adriatic Sea in support of United Nations efforts with the war-torn Federal Republic of Yugoslavia. Normandy's primary duty was Adriatic air-space controller for Operations Provide Promise, Deny Flight, and Sharp Guard.

=== 50th Anniversary of D-Day ===
In a historic first, Normandy embarked nine World War II veterans on 18 May 1994, for commemoration of the 50th anniversary of the Allied landings on the coast of France. These activities took place in Portsmouth, England, until 31 May, ending in Le Havre, France. Over 15,000 visitors toured the ship while Normandy's honor guard embarked veterans participated in various memorial services and events on both sides of the English Channel. Normandy served as a centerpiece over the two-week course of ceremonies, and specifically for national commemorations at Slapton Sands, United Kingdom, on 31 May, by U.S. Ambassador Crowe, and at the Normandy beachheads on 6 June, by President Bill Clinton.

On 27 June 1994, Normandy participated in the Naval Station New York closing ceremonies. Staten Island's Borough President, Guy Molinari, and his daughter Congresswoman Susan Molinari were the featured speakers as the Navy turned the base over to the city's Emergency Services. After four years homeported at Staten Island, New York, Normandy departed for her new homeport of Norfolk, Virginia.

=== Operation Deliberate Force ===
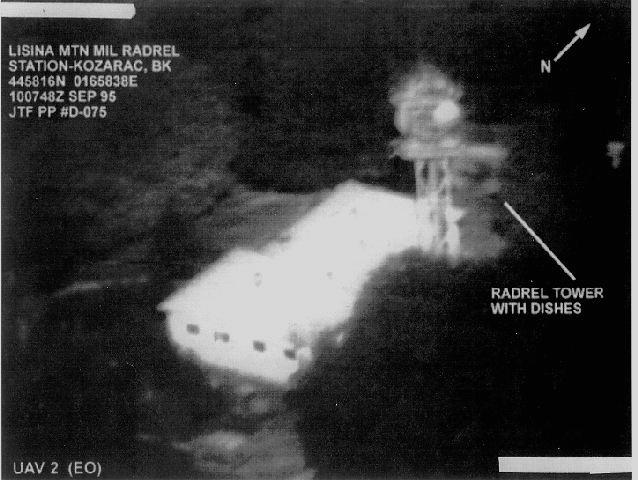
Lisina radio relay tower before the Tomahawk strike

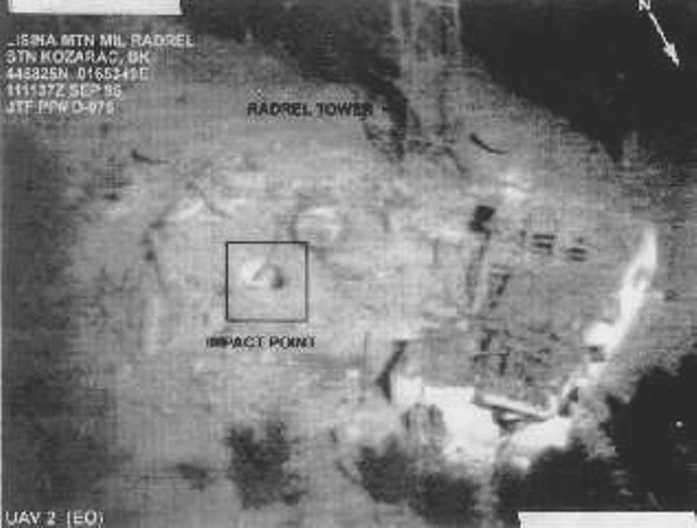
The same facility after the Tomahawk strike

On 28 August 1995, Normandy began a six-month deployment to the Mediterranean with America. On 8 September, Normandy was in the Western Mediterranean conducting turnover with the outgoing battle group. After receiving immediate tasking to proceed to the Adriatic, Normandy sailed across the 1,600 nautical miles (2,960 km) at maximum speed. Arriving in the Operation Deliberate Force theater of operations on 10 September, Normandy launched a 13 Tomahawk missile strike against hostile air defense command and control sites in Lisina, Bosnia-Herzegovina, north of the Bosnian Serb stronghold of Banja Luka, between 20:40 and 20:45. The cruiser used a new type of Tomahawk missile, the Block-III model, which included for the first time GPS guidance in combination with its TERCOM system based on topographic maps. This gave flexibility and speed to the attack. The attack destroyed the radio-relay station, hit by seven missiles, while three other struck bunkers and buildings south of the facility, disabling the site's radar. This precision strike, flawlessly executed on extremely short notice, paved the way for follow-on tactical air strikes against Bosnian Serb military positions in the region. This action sent a strong signal of United States resolve and played a significant role in convincing the Bosnian Serb government to cease hostilities and resume peace negotiations. During the six-month deployment Normandy again served as Adriatic air-space controller for Operation Deny Flight, Sharp Guard, and Decisive Endeavor.

=== Exercise Bright Star and Operation Southern Watch ===
On 3 October 1997, Normandy once again began a six-month deployment, this time as Air Defense Commander of the George Washington battle group. Throughout the month of October, Normandy participated, along with 27 other international units, in Exercise Bright Star off the Egyptian coast. Upon completion of Bright Star, Normandy was directed to proceed at best speed to the Persian Gulf.

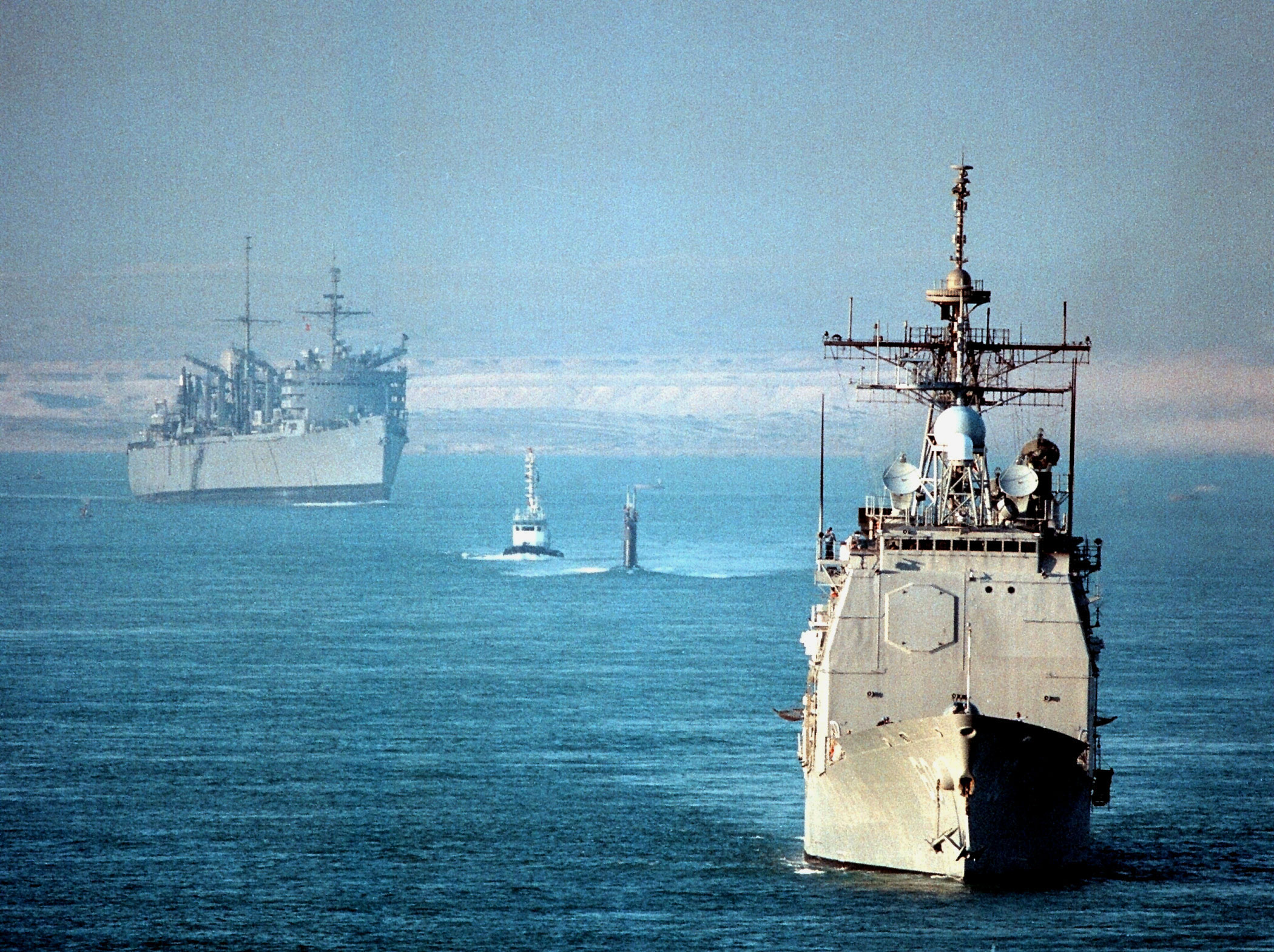
USS Normandy leads the submarine USS Annapolis and fast combat support ship USS Seattle to the Persian Gulf, 16 November 1997.

Beginning 16 November, Normandy, along with other units of the George Washington battle group, transited the Suez Canal, Red Sea, Gulf of Oman, and Arabian Sea. In a record-setting five days, Normandy and George Washington entered the Persian Gulf and joined the Nimitz Battle Group in an impressive show of force and United Nation resolve to Iraq. Normandy immediately assumed duties as the "Ready Strike" platform in the Gulf and, later, also assumed duties as the air-defense commander for the entire Persian Gulf. For four months Normandy patrolled the Gulf in support of Operation Southern Watch. During this time, she conducted several successful maritime-interception operations along with her strike and air-defense duties.

Throughout this deployment, Normandy achieved more than 300 mishap-free hours of flight operations, conducted 27 underway replenishments and sailed a total of 48,000 miles (77,000 km). Underway for the holidays, Normandy hosted pop singer Paula Cole on 23 December. On Christmas morning, it hosted Chief of Naval Operations Admiral Jay L. Johnson, his wife, and Master Chief Petty Officer of the Navy ETCM John Hagan. George Washington's battle group was relieved by the John C. Stennis Battle Group in the Persian Gulf, and Normandy returned to her homeport of Norfolk on 3 April 1998. Normandy finished a major overhaul period in Norfolk Naval Shipyard on 28 February.

=== 2023-24 Israel–Gaza war ===
On 8 October 2023, the day after the October 7 attacks, the U.S. Secretary of Defense, Lloyd Austin, directed the Gerald R. Ford carrier strike group to the Eastern Mediterranean in response. Along with the carrier, the group also includes Normandy, and the destroyers Ramage, Carney, Roosevelt and Thomas Hudner.

On 24 January 2024, USS Normandy returns home to Norfolk from 8-month deployment. Over the course of 262 days, Normandy's crew conducted over 40 replenishments-at-sea, and manned flight quarters 670 times. Normandy's embarked air detachment, the "Spartans" of Helicopter Maritime Strike Squadron (HSM) 70, flew 393 sorties, totaling 1,132 hours flown.

=== Miscellaneous Activities ===
On 8 May 1990, Normandy responded to a distress call by the destroyer Conyngham off of the coast of Virginia. A major fuel oil fire erupted from the ship's Forward Fire Room into the ship's superstructure, isolating the crew forward and aft. Fire crews from the Normandy boarded Conyngham via small boat transfer and were instrumental in extinguishing the fire.

On 21 June 2000, Normandy and the George Washington Battle Group deployed to the Mediterranean and the Arabian Sea. On 19 December, Normandy returned to Norfolk just in time for the holidays.

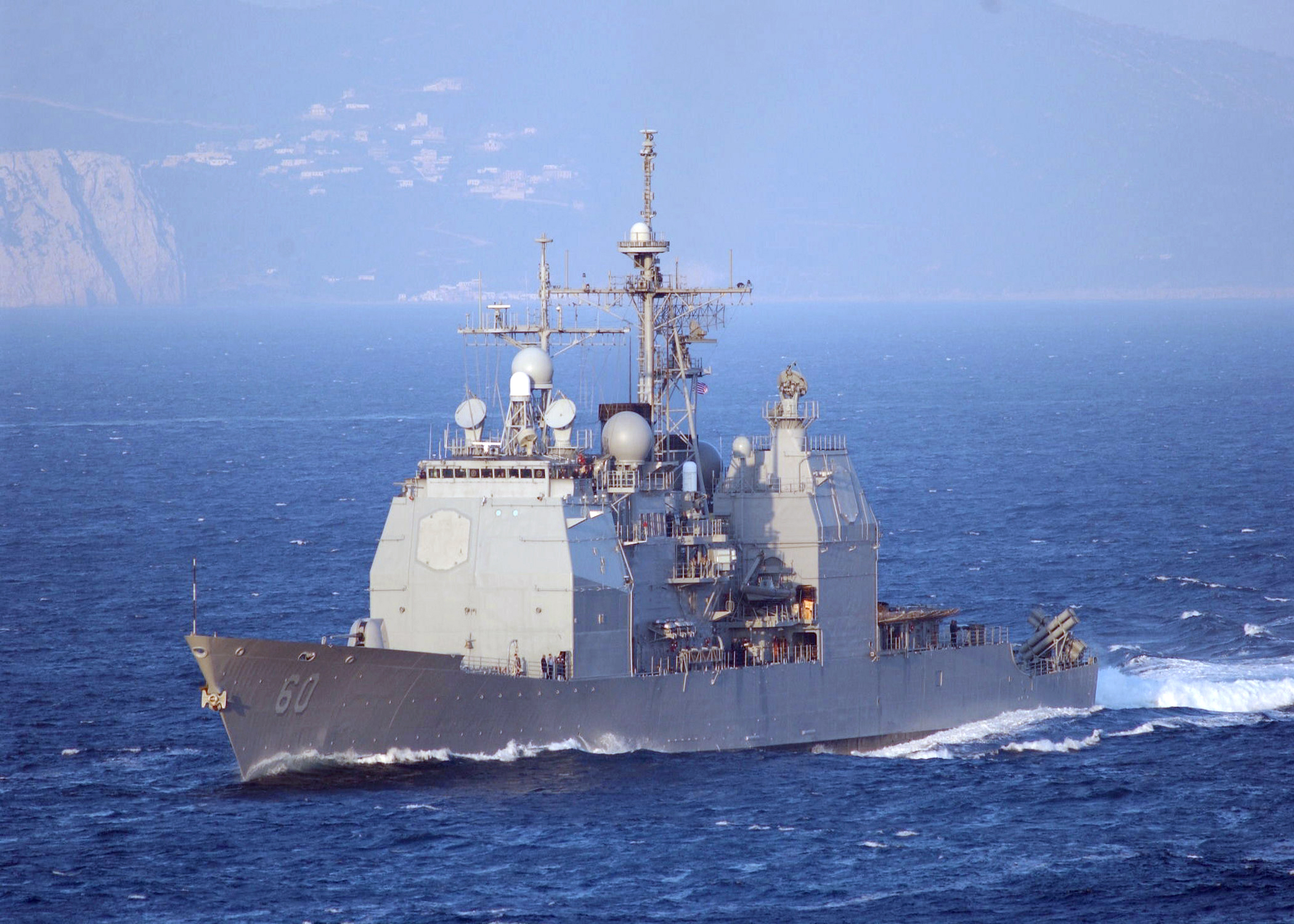
USS Normandy underway, 1 July 2002.

On 20 June 2002, Normandy left the US East Coast on deployment. Again assigned to the George Washington Battle Group, Normandy returned to Norfolk in December 2002.

In 2003, the ship was assigned to Cruiser-Destroyer Group 2.

On 25 March 2005, Normandy left the East Coast with the assault ship Kearsarge ESG, deployed to the Mediterranean and Northern Persian Gulf. Normandy returned to Norfolk in October 2005.

In April 2007, Normandy deployed on her 7-month NATO cruise. The ship's crew was awarded the Article 5 NATO Medal. She returned on Halloween after 200 days of showing the flag, in the process becoming the first ship to circumnavigate Africa. On this cruise, sailors on board earned their Bluenose and Emerald Shellback.

On 13 January 2010, Normandy was ordered to assist in humanitarian efforts following the 2010 Haiti earthquake.

On 20 May 2010, Normandy deployed to the Persian Gulf for a seven-month deployment. It returned on 12 December 2010, on a bitterly cold, snowy day.

In 2012, Normandy deployed for two months to the Baltic Sea in support of diplomatic relations in regards to BaltOps 2012 and FRUKUS 2012 (France, Russia, United Kingdom, and United States).

On 20 April 2015, Normandy along with Theodore Roosevelt were deployed off the coast of Yemen to intercept suspected Iranian weapons shipments intended for the Houthi rebels, who are locked in battle with Yemeni government forces.

On 9 February 2020 while patrolling in the Arabian Sea, Normandy captured a stateless dhow carrying a cargo of 358 missiles, Iranian surface-to-air missiles.

In July of 2024, Normandy conducted show of force operations in the Norwegian Sea alongside USS Tennessee (SSBN-734).

On September 25, 2025, Normandy, alongside her sister ship, Philippine Sea, hosted her decommissioning ceremony. She was officially decommissioned on September 26, 2025.

On February 27, 2026, ex-Normandy was towed to Naval Inactive Ship Maintenance Facility, Philadelphia, PA.

== Awards ==
Normandy received the Navy Unit Commendation, the National Defense Service Medal, and the Southwest Asia Service Medal (with two bronze stars) for her efforts in support of Operations Desert Shield and Desert Storm. She was awarded her second Navy Unit Commendation Medal in June 1994, for her extensive participation in events commemorating D-Day. Normandy was awarded her third Navy Unit Commendation and the Meritorious Unit Commendation for her actions during her time in the Adriatic in 1995. The cruiser won the Marjorie Sterrett Battleship Fund Award for the Atlantic Fleet in 1997.

Along with the 1998 title "Most Tomahawks shot by a US Navy cruiser", Normandy holds multiple Battle "E" Awards for overall ship-wide excellence in performance.

== Coat of arms ==
=== Shield ===
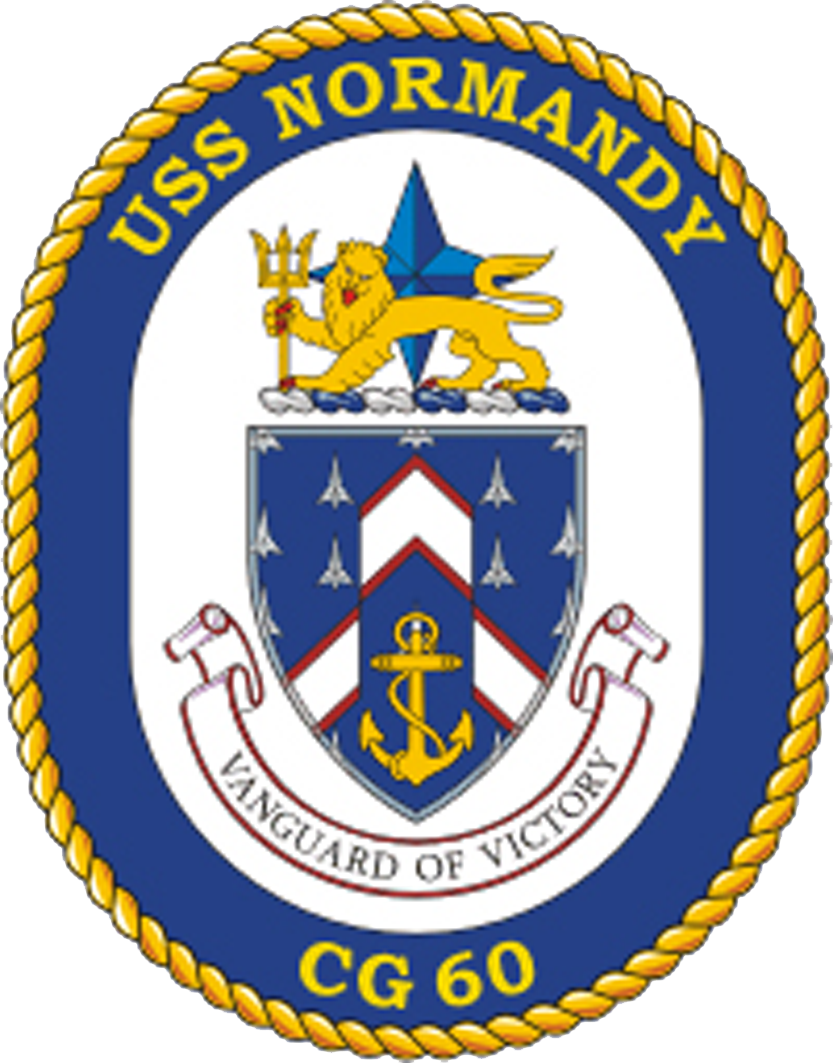

The lettering, lion, anchor, and perimeter of the shield are gold. The border beneath the lettering and the crest background are dark blue. These are the color traditionally associated with the Navy. The caltraps symbolize mines and German defenses on the Normandy beaches. The anchor characterizes sea power and strength. The chevron is broken and thrust forward, denoting the assault landing and the "breaking through" the enemy defenses; it is white for honor and integrity, edged with red for valor, sacrifice, and bloodshed.

=== Crest ===
The pole star signifies the Allied Forces that joined for the Normandy Invasion. It also portrays the four points of the globe, signifying the worldwide mission of the Normandy. The gold lion, adopted from the Coat of Arms of Normandy, France, represents the location of the assault and characterizes the courage, strength, and determination of the invasion forces. He grasps an inflamed trident in honor of Neptune, mythological lord of the sea, and code name for the Navy's crucial gunfire support and the delivery of land forces in the Battle of Normandy.

=== Motto ===
The words, "VANGUARD OF VICTORY," underscore the Battle of Normandy as the spearhead of the Allied defense which turned the tide of war in Europe, as well as the leading role of the AEGIS cruiser in today's world as a defender of world freedom.
