= USS Thomas Hudner =

Arleigh Burke-class destroyer

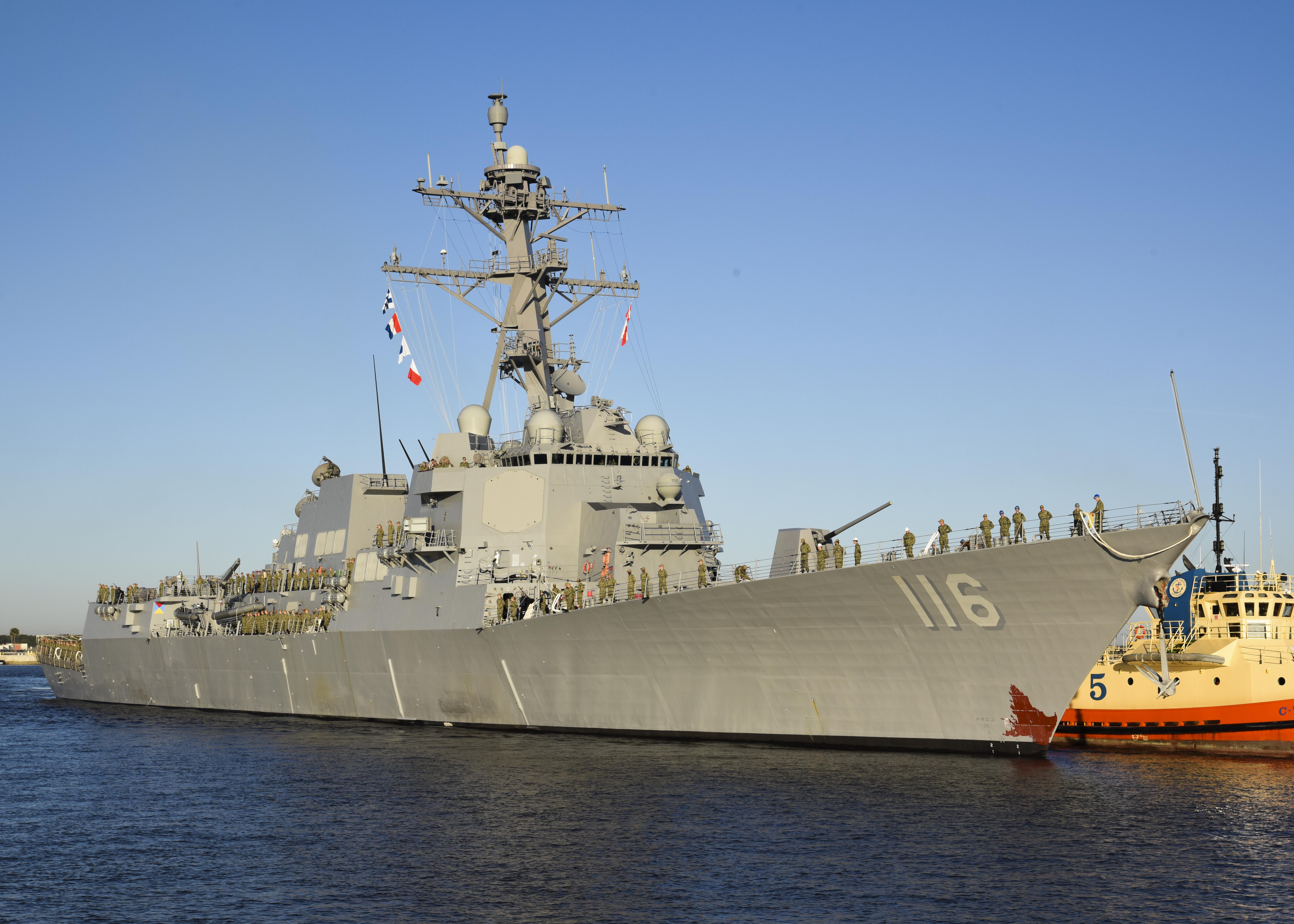
- USS Thomas Hudner on 30 October 2018

History

United States
- Name: Thomas Hudner
- Namesake: Thomas J. Hudner, Jr.
- Ordered: 28 February 2012
- Builder: Bath Iron Works
- Laid down: 16 November 2015
- Launched: 23 April 2017
- Sponsored by: Georgea F. Hudner; Barbara Joan Miller
- Christened: 1 April 2017
- Acquired: 15 June 2018
- Commissioned: 1 December 2018
- Home port: Mayport, Florida
- Identification: MMSI number: 368926291; Callsign: NTSH; Hull number: DDG-116
- Motto: Above all Others
- Status: in active service
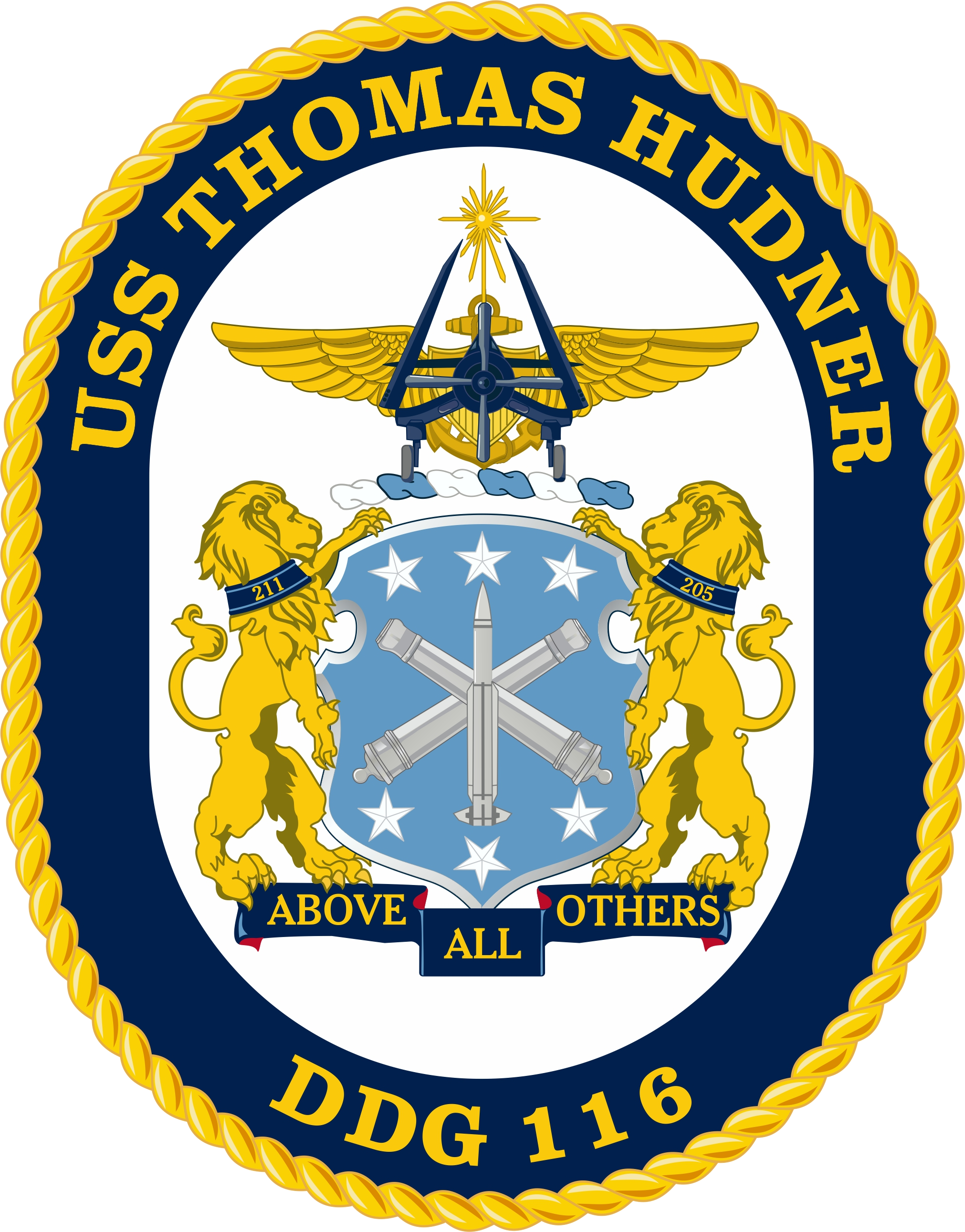
- Badge

General characteristics
- Class & type: Arleigh Burke-class destroyer
- Displacement: 9,217 tons (full load)
- Length: 513 ft (156 m)
- Beam: 66 ft (20 m)
- Draft: 31 ft (9.4 m)
- Propulsion: 4 × General Electric LM2500 gas turbines 100,000 shp (75,000 kW)
- Speed: In excess of 30 knots (56 km/h; 35 mph)
- Complement: 380 officers and enlisted
- Armament: Guns: 1 × 5-inch (127 mm)/62 Mk 45 Mod 4 (lightweight gun); 1 × 20 mm (0.8 in) Phalanx CIWS; 2 × 25 mm (0.98 in) Mk 38 machine gun system; 4 × 0.50 in (12.7 mm) caliber guns; Missiles: 1 × 32-cell, 1 × 64-cell (96 total cells) Mk 41 vertical launching system (VLS): RIM-66M surface-to-air missile; RIM-156 surface-to-air missile; RIM-174A Standard ERAM; RIM-161 anti-ballistic missile; RIM-162 ESSM (quad-packed); BGM-109 Tomahawk cruise missile; RUM-139 vertical launch ASROC; Torpedoes: 2 × Mark 32 triple torpedo tubes: Mark 46 lightweight torpedo; Mark 50 lightweight torpedo; Mark 54 lightweight torpedo
- Aircraft carried: 2 × MH-60R Seahawk helicopters
- Aviation facilities: Double hangar and helipad

USS Thomas Hudner (DDG-116) is the first Flight IIA Technology Insertion variant of the Arleigh Burke-class guided missile destroyer. The $663 million contract to build her was awarded on 28 February 2012, to Bath Iron Works, of Bath, Maine. On 7 May 2012, Secretary of the Navy Ray Mabus announced the ship name would be named Thomas Hudner in honor of U.S. naval aviator Thomas Hudner, who was awarded the Medal of Honor for his actions in trying to save the life of his wingman, Ensign Jesse L. Brown, during the Battle of Chosin Reservoir, in the Korean War.

== Construction and design ==
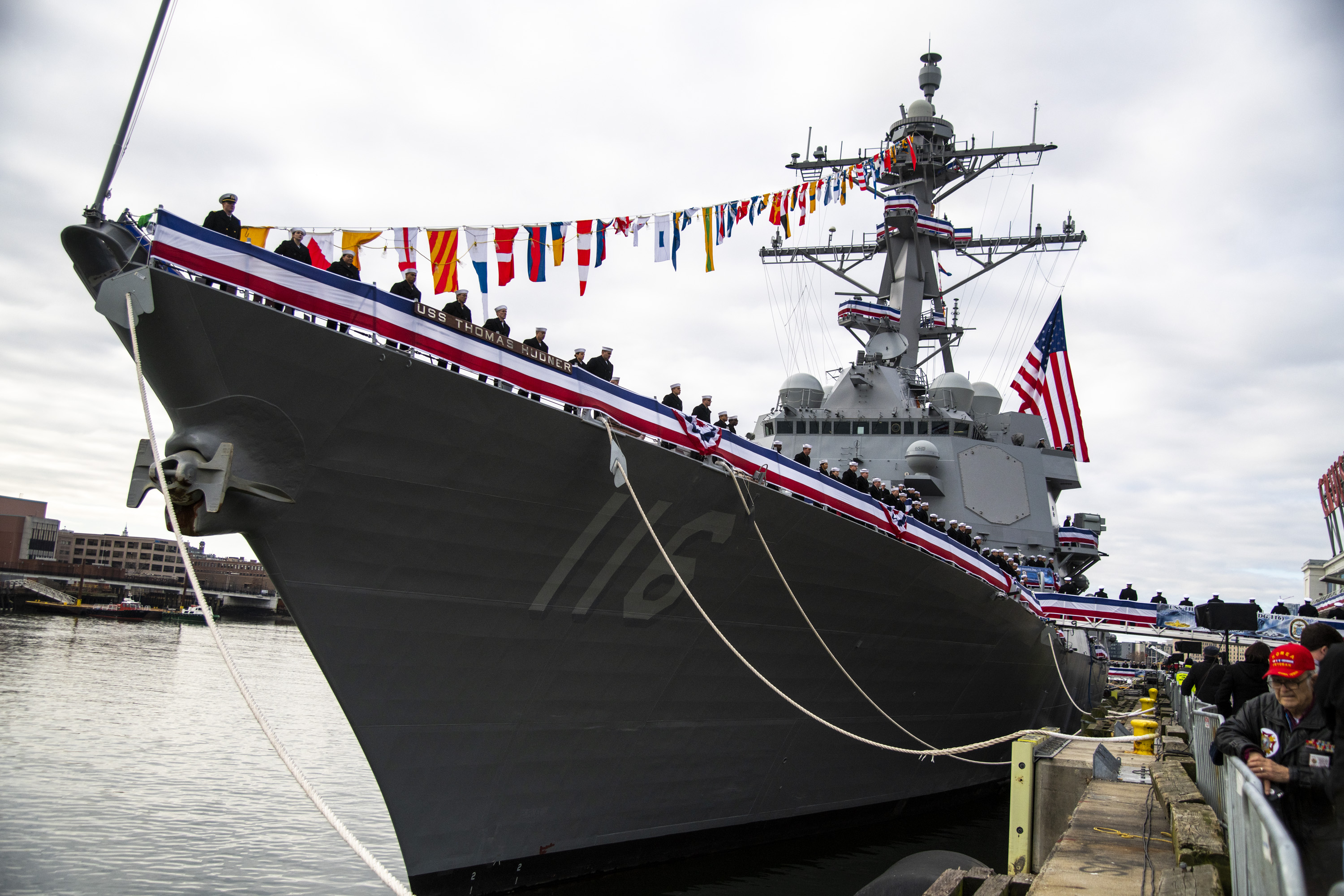
The Thomas Hudner commissioning ceremony (2018)

Thomas Hudner is the 66th ship of the Arleigh Burke class of guided-missile destroyers, the first of which, USS Arleigh Burke (DDG-51), was commissioned in July 1991. As an Arleigh Burke-class ship, Thomas Hudner's roles include anti-aircraft, anti-submarine, and anti-surface warfare, as well as strike operations. During its long production run, the class was built in three flights—Flight I (DDG-51–DDG-71), Flight II (DDG-72–DDG-78), and Flight IIA (DDG-79– ). Thomas Hudner was to be a "Technology Insertion" ship with elements of the next generation of Arleigh Burke class destroyers, called Flight III, and Flight III proper is planned to start with DDG-125.

In 2008, the U.S. Navy decided to restart production of the Arleigh Burke class as orders for the Zumwalt-class destroyer were reduced from thirty-two to three. The first three ships (DDG-113—DDG-115) ordered following the product decision are known as the "restart" ships, while "technology insertion" ships (DDG-116—DDG-123) were expected to incorporate certain elements of Arleigh Burke class Flight III, which in turn was planned to run from DDG-125 onwards.

Thomas Hudner's keel was laid on 16 November 2015. Her christening took place on 1 April 2017, and she was launched three weeks later, on 23 April. She completed acceptance trials 3 May 2018, and on 15 June 2018, the Navy accepted delivery of Thomas Hudner from shipbuilder General Dynamics Bath Iron Works. Thomas Hudner was commissioned on 1 December 2018, in Boston, Massachusetts.

== Service history ==
=== 2018–2022 ===
As of 2018, Thomas Hudner's home port was Naval Station Mayport, Florida.

From July to August 2020, Thomas Hudner participated in Operation Nanook alongside vessels from the Canadian, French, & Danish navies.

On 20 February 2021 Thomas Hudner embarked on her maiden deployment, traveling over 45,000 nautical miles (83,000 km) before returning to her home port on 17 July 2021. During her deployment, she made transits to the Black Sea, operated in the Mediterranean Sea with the French aircraft carrier Charles de Gaulle and her battlegroup, and also took part in the annual BALTOPS exercise with NATO allies.

In September 2021 Thomas Hudner, along with her sister ship Forrest Sherman, participated in "Operation Cutlass Fury" with the Canadian and French navies. Later that month, she became a part of the newly formed Task Group Greyhound.

In November 2022 Thomas Hudner joined the new aircraft carrier USS Gerald R. Ford as part of Carrier Strike Group Four operating in the Atlantic Ocean with multiple other nations. This was the carrier's first time leading a Strike Group. The Strike Group also included the Ticonderoga-class cruiser USS Normandy, and her sister ships USS Ramage and USS McFaul. CSG 4 participated in a NATO Task Force Exercise along with ships from other NATO nations including HMCS Fredericton, a Halifax-class frigate of the Royal Canadian Navy, the FGS Hessen, a Sachsen-class frigate of the German Navy, and the Spanish frigate Álvaro de Bazán, the lead ship for a class of air defense frigate. They arrived at Portsmouth, England, on 14 November 2022.

=== 2023–present ===
On 8 October 2023, the day after the October 7 attacks, the U.S. Secretary of Defense, Lloyd Austin, directed the Gerald R. Ford carrier strike group to the Eastern Mediterranean in response. Along with the carrier, the group also included the cruiser Normandy, and the destroyers Ramage, Carney, Roosevelt and Thomas Hudner.

On 15 November 2023, Thomas Hudner shot down a drone that was headed toward the ship, which was launched from Yemen.

On 23 November 2023, Thomas Hudner shot down multiple attack drones launched from Yemen.

On 4 January 2024, Thomas Hudner returned to Mayport after an eight-month deployment and sailing more than 60,000 miles.

In June 2025, Thomas Hudner was sent to the Eastern Mediterranean during the June 2025 Israeli strikes on Iran.

== Awards ==
- Combat Action Ribbon - (October 2023 - April 2024)
- Navy Unit Commendation - (2021 (IKE CSG), Oct 2023 - May 2024)
- Captain Edward F. Ney Memorial Award - (2023)
- CNO Afloat Safety Award (LANTFLT)- (2020, 2023)
