= Donald E. Runyon =

American World War II flying ace

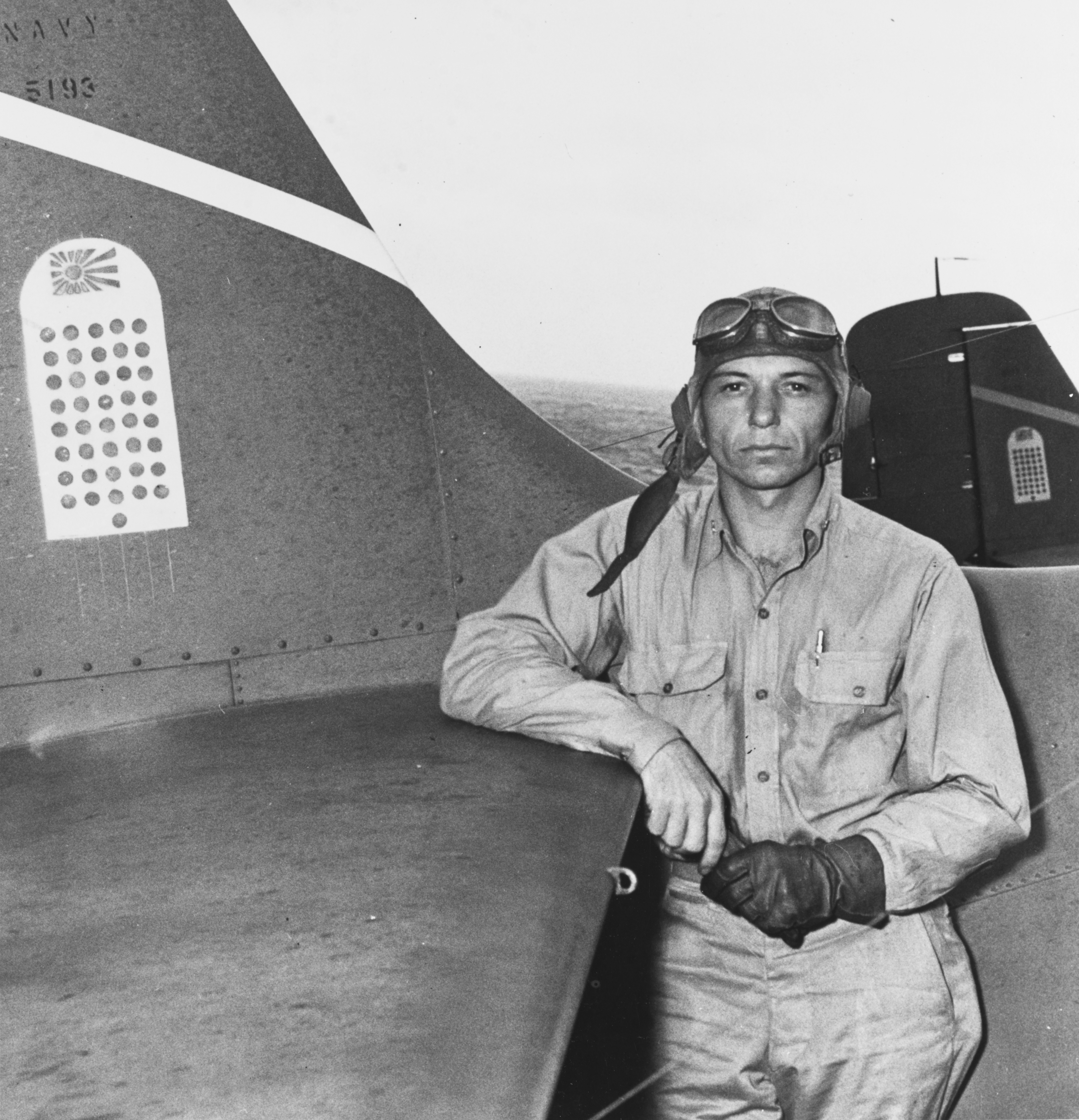
- Runyon aboard USS Enterprise (CV-6), 10 September 1942
- Born: June 26, 1913; Fairmount, Illinois
- Died: December 1984 (aged 71); La Jolla, California
- Military career
- Allegiance: United States
- Branch: United States Navy
- Rank: Lieutenant
- Units: VF-6; VF-18
- Conflicts: World War II
- Awards: Navy Cross; Distinguished Flying Cross

Donald Eugene Runyon (June 26, 1913 – December 1984) was a United States Navy aviator and a flying ace of World War II, credited with shooting down eleven Japanese aircraft while flying with VF-6 and VF-18.

== Early life ==
Runyon was born 26 June 1913 to Mr. and Mrs. Harvey Runyon at Fairmount, Illinois, and grew up on his parents' 80-acre farm near Alamo, Indiana. He attended Alamo High School for three years and Crawfordsville High School for one year. Joining the Navy at age 21, he did his boot training at Norfolk, Virginia, and was a Machinist.

== Military service ==
Runyon did two hitches in the Navy, the first as an enlisted Naval Aviation Pilot. He was the Navy's top Wildcat ace of World War II. He scored eight victories in three combats as a warrant officer with VF-6 of USS Enterprise during August 1942, including four kills during the Battle of the Eastern Solomons. On 7 August, he downed two Val dive bombers, and the next day added a Zero and a Betty to his score. On 24 August, Runyon shot down three Vals and a Zero. Runyon was awarded the Navy Cross in June 1943 for his actions on 7–8 August 1942. He also received the Distinguished Flying Cross for his action during his first tour.

During his second combat tour in the Pacific in 1943 as a commissioned officer, he scored three more victories while flying F6F Hellcats with VF-18 off of USS Bunker Hill.

== Death ==
Runyon died in December 1984. His home of record was La Jolla, California.
