= VFA-32 =

Strike Fighter Squadron 32
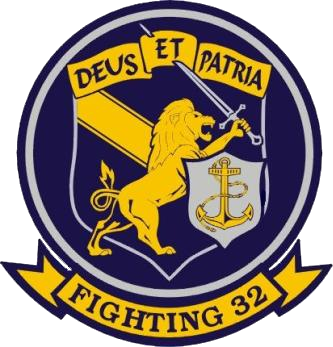
- Founded: 1 February 1945; 80 years ago
- Allegiance: United States
- Branch: United States Navy
- Type: Fighter/Attack
- Role: Close air support Air interdiction Aerial reconnaissance
- Part of: Carrier Air Wing Three
- Garrison/HQ: NAS Oceana
- Nickname: "Fighting Swordsmen"
- Mottos: Deus et Patria ("God and Country")
- Engagements: World War II; Korean War; 1958 Lebanon Crisis; Vietnam War; Multinational Force in Lebanon; United States invasion of Grenada; Gulf of Sidra incident (1989); Gulf War; Operation Provide Promise; Operation Deny Flight; Operation Southern Watch; Operation Deliberate Force; Operation Desert Fox; Iraq War; Operation Enduring Freedom; Operation Inherent Resolve; Operation Prosperity Guardian; Operation Poseidon Archer; 2024 missile strikes in Yemen

Commanders
- Current commander: CDR Jason P. Hoch, USN

Aircraft flown
- Fighter: F6F Hellcat; F8F Bearcat; F4U Corsair; F-9 Cougar; F-8 Crusader; F-4B Phantom II; F-14 Tomcat; F/A-18F Super Hornet

Strike Fighter Squadron 32 (VFA-32), nicknamed the "Fighting Swordsmen", are a United States Navy strike fighter squadron presently flying the F/A-18F Super Hornet and based ashore at Naval Air Station Oceana. Their radio callsign is Gypsy and their tail code is AC. The Fighting Swordsmen of VFA-32 were the 2023 recipients of the Mutha Fighter Spirit Award, awarded annually at the Navy’s Strike Fighter Ball in Norfolk, VA.

Their mission is: "Strike Fighter Squadron 32, as a part of United States Naval Aviation, utilizes the F/A-18F aircraft to project power ashore and at sea, to defend the Fleet against air and sea threats and to carry out all other missions which may be assigned by cognizant authority."

== Insignia and nickname ==
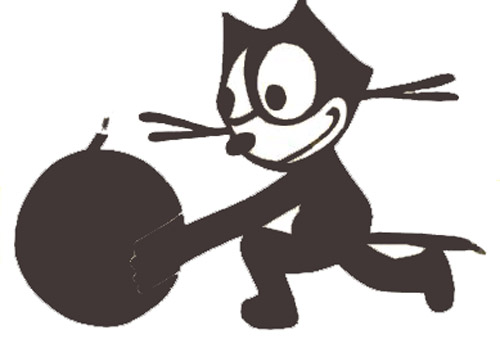
Early VBF-3 insignia

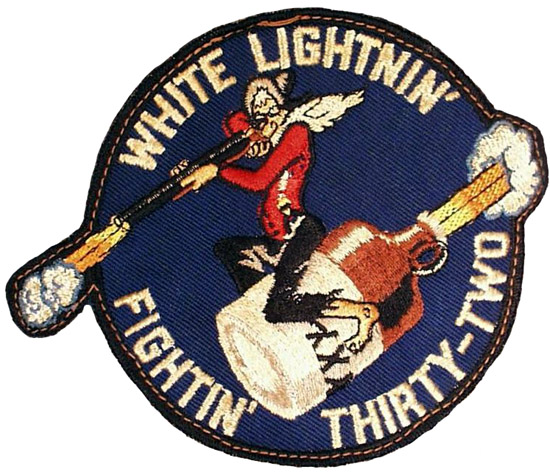
Early VF-32 insignia

Originally, the squadron used the Fighting Three Felix the Cat symbol and called themselves the "Crazy Cats" because so many pilots were from Fighting Three. At one time, the squadron was known as the "White Lightning." In 1950, the squadron adopted the insignia of a traditional heraldry lion under Naval Aviation wings of gold and the motto "Deus et Patria" that has endured with only slight modernization through today. The VF-32 squadron radio callsign is "Gypsy" and most alumni refer to themselves as "Gypsies". The squadron picked up the nickname Swordsmen after it switched to the F-8 Crusader and added a sword to the lion's hand.

== History ==
=== 1940s ===
VFA-32 was established as Bombing Fighting Three (VBF-3) on 1 February 1945, flying the F6F Hellcat, when it was split off from VF-3, the famed Felix squadron. Fritz Wolf, a former member of the American Volunteer Group (AVG) or Flying Tigers, was assigned as the first VBF-3 commanding officer. At the time, U.S. Navy carriers were closing on the Japanese home islands and were facing aggressive Kamikaze attacks. VBF-3 was assigned to Carrier Air Group THREE on board USS Yorktown in the Pacific theater. On 16 February 1945, VBF-3 pilots became the Navy's first carrier-based pilots to strike the Japanese islands. During the heavy action on that day, the squadron shot down 24 Japanese aircraft, earning the Presidential Unit Citation.

On 15 November 1946, VBF-3 was redesignated VF-4A and switched to the F8F-1 Bearcat. On 7 August 1948, VF-4A became VF-32 and switched to the F4U Corsair.

=== 1950s ===
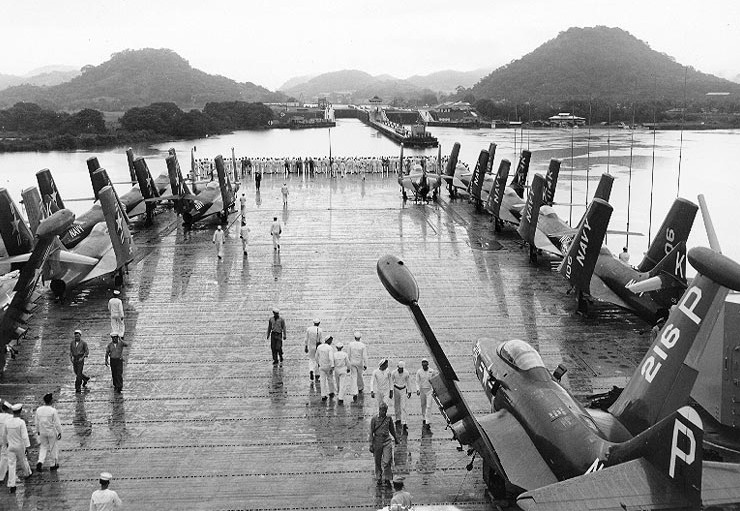
VF-32 F9F-6s during the world cruise of USS Tarawa in 1954.

In 1950, the squadron were deployed to the Korean War with F4Us aboard USS Leyte. From October 1950 to January 1951, under the command of Richard L. Cevoli, VF-32 hit Korean targets including Wonsan Harbor, Puckchong, Chonjin, and Chosin Reservoir. On 4 December 1950, the aircraft of Ensign Jesse L. Brown, the first African-American aviator to complete the Navy's basic flight training program, was hit by flak while supporting embattled Marines at Chosin. He crash-landed his Corsair behind enemy lines on a snow-covered mountain slope. His wingman, Lt. (j.g.) Thomas J. Hudner Jr., could see that Brown survived the forced landing, but appeared to be trapped in the cockpit with smoke coming from the engine compartment. In an attempt to save his squadron mate, Hudner crash-landed his own plane nearby. Hudner found Brown semi-conscious, and with the assistance of a responding helicopter pilot, attempted but was unable to extricate Brown from the crumpled fuselage. Although the attempted rescue failed, Hudner received the Medal of Honor and Brown received, posthumously, the Distinguished Flying Cross.

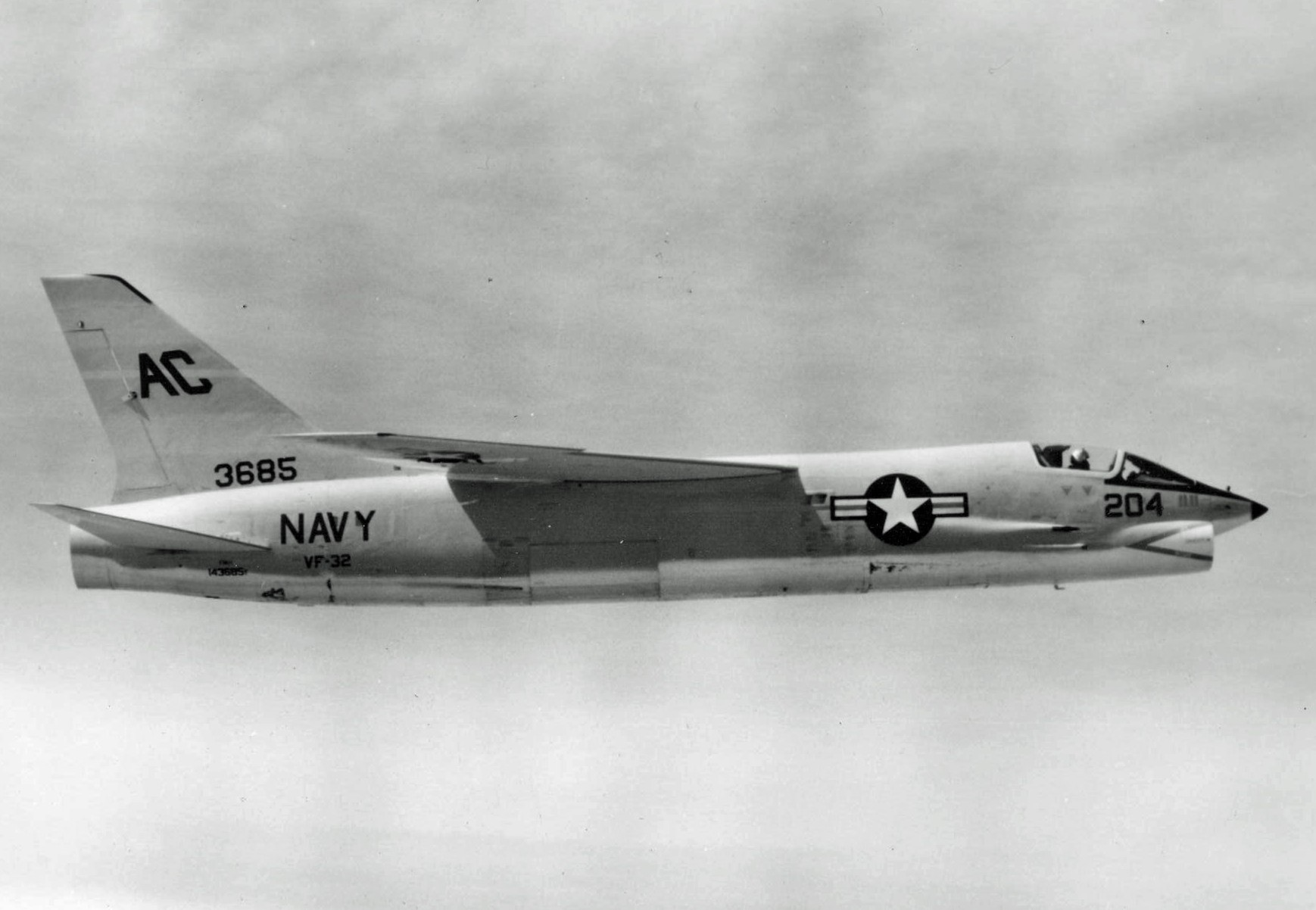
VF-32 F8U-1 in 1958

In November 1952, the squadron returned to the East Coast and became the first squadron to operate the swept-wing F9F-6 Cougar. VF-32 made subsequent deployments aboard USS Tarawa in 1953 and the USS Ticonderoga in 1955. In 1956, VF-32 became the first squadron to transition to the F8U-1 Crusader, thus becoming the first supersonic squadron in the Navy.

While deployed aboard USS Saratoga as a unit of Carrier Air Group THREE, VF-32 participated in the 1958 Lebanon crisis.

=== 1960s ===
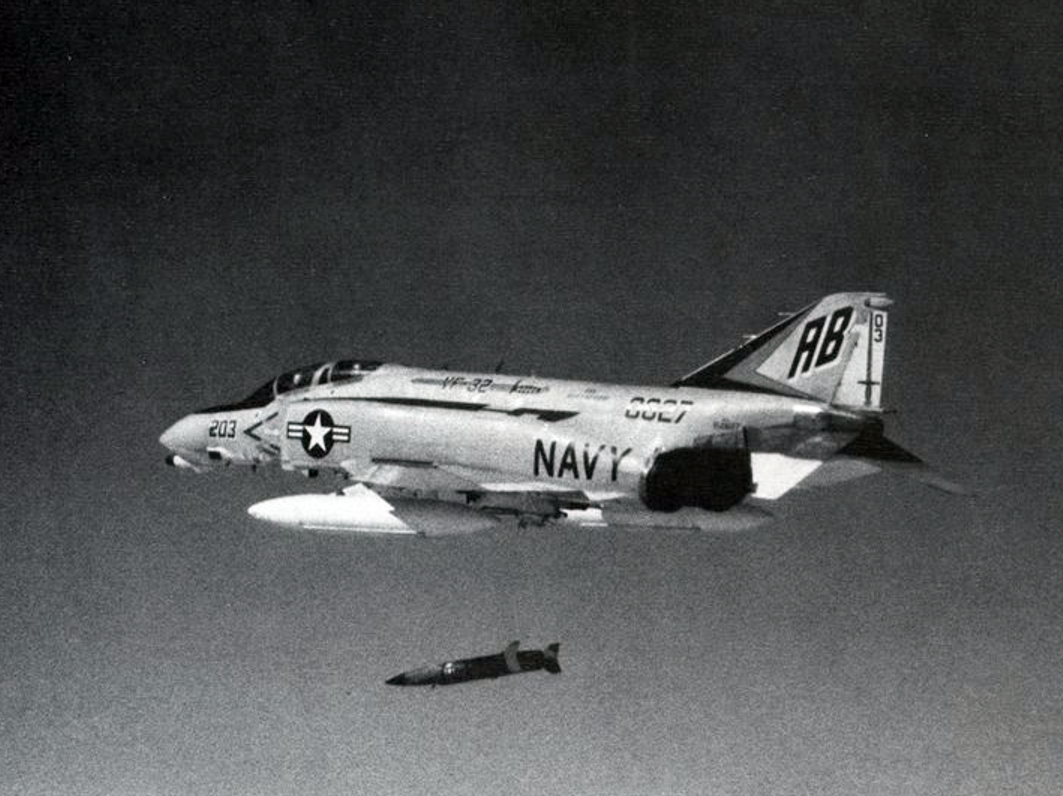
VF-32 F-4B in 1971

During the Cuban Missile Crisis in late 1962, VF-32 flew 96 sorties to support photo-reconnaissance flights and intelligence-gathering missions. After returning from cruise in 1965, the squadron changed homeport from NAS Cecil Field, Florida to NAS Oceana, Virginia, and switched to the F-4B Phantom II. VF-32 detached from Carrier Air Group THREE, ending a relationship that had lasted since the squadron's establishment.

In June 1966, VF-32 embarked aboard USS Franklin D. Roosevelt as a component of Carrier Air Group ONE and sailed for Yankee Station in Southeast Asia. The squadron flew 940 combat sorties during three line periods in five months, building a highly successful Vietnam War combat record, losing no aircraft or aircrew. In May 1968, VF-32 deployed aboard USS John F. Kennedy for her maiden voyage.

=== 1970s ===
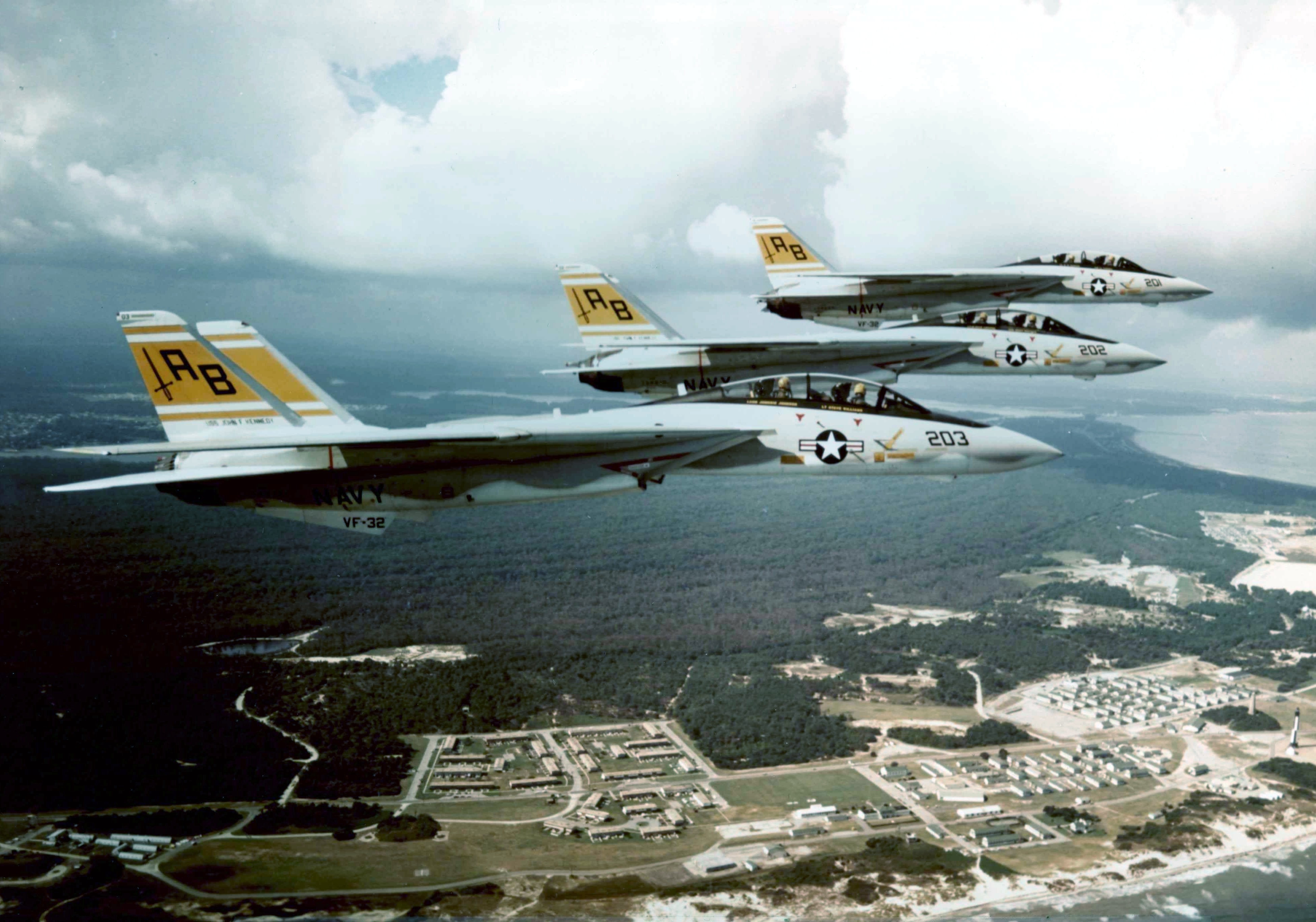
VF-32 F-14As in 1974

For service in October 1970, the squadron received the Meritorious Unit Commendation for actions in support of the United States Sixth Fleet operations during the Middle East Crisis.

In 1974, VF-32 switched to the F-14 Tomcat at NAS Miramar before moving to NAS Oceana as one of the first fleet Tomcat squadrons based there. VF-32 made the first Atlantic Fleet F-14 deployment in June 1975. On that cruise, VF-32 was awarded the Joseph Clifton Award as the Navy's top fighter squadron.

In October 1977, VF-32 became the first fleet squadron to fly against the Air Force F-15 Eagle, setting the stage for regularly scheduled dissimilar air combat training between the Air Force and Navy. VF-32 again embarked for the Mediterranean aboard Kennedy in June 1978. During this deployment, VF-32 conducted the first fleet test and evaluation of the new Television Camera System. The squadron also deployed with AIM-9L Sidewinder missiles for the first fleet captive-carry evaluation. A mid-cruise missile exercise, "BUZZARDEX", saw firings of AIM-54 Phoenix and AIM-7 Sparrow missiles at five targets moving at Mach 2.5. In October 1979, VF-32 completed 10 years of accident-free flying. In those 10 years, the squadron flew over 33,000 hours, including 17,000 in the F-14A.

=== 1980s ===
In 1980, the squadron was again presented with the Admiral Clifton Award. In 1980 and 1981, the squadron achieved an accident-free Mediterranean deployment aboard Kennedy, followed in 1982 by another accident-free Med cruise aboard USS Independence and the 1982 Commander, Naval Air Force U.S. Atlantic Fleet Battle "E" and CNO Safety "S" awards. In 1982, three VF-32 Tomcats tail numbers 211, 212 and 214, were modified to carry the Tactical Air Reconnaissance Pod System TARPS pod.

In 1983–84, the squadron completed the Navy's first combat deployment since the Vietnam era with CVW-6 aboard Independence. VF-32 flew combat air patrol missions and provided TARPS imagery for 4 December 1983 CVW-6/CVW-3 air strikes on Syrian positions in Lebanon. VF-32 also flew missions in support of Operation Urgent Fury in Grenada providing pre- and post-battle damage assessment using photography from the TARPS pod. The deployment concluded with participation in NATO exercise "TEAMWORK 84" in the Norwegian Sea. The squadron made a third deployment aboard Independence from October 1984 through February 1985 to the Mediterranean and Indian Ocean.

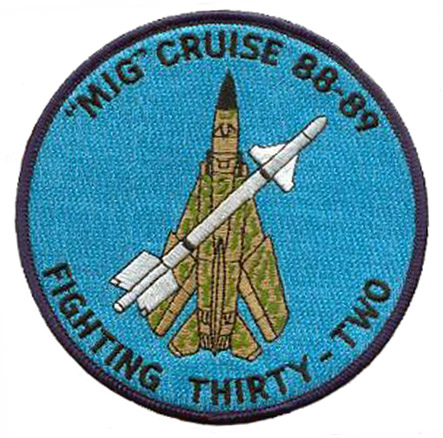
Special patch from 1988–89 deployment

The squadron rejoined CVW-3 in February 1985, and embarked aboard John F. Kennedy in August 1986 for another Mediterranean deployment. This cruise saw the squadron's Class "A" safety record extended another year, but also included the first night F-14 barricade landing. VF-32 participated in a variety of NATO and combined exercises, and extended their major mishap-free safety record to nine years during a 1988–89 Mediterranean deployment, again aboard John F. Kennedy.

On 4 January 1989, while flying from John F. Kennedy during a routine patrol over the Gulf of Sidra, two VF-32 F-14s intercepted two Libyan MiG-23 Floggers, which had originated from the Al Bumbai airfield in Tobruk. After attempting a peaceful intercept, the F-14s used their Television Camera System (TCS) to verify that the MiGs were armed. Hostile intent was declared and the aircraft were cleared to engage. The lead fired an AIM-7 Sparrow, which failed to track. His wingman also fired an AIM-7, which tracked and destroyed one of the MiGs, its pilot ejecting. The first F-14 then closed to AIM-9 Sidewinder range and downed the remaining MiG-23, whose pilot also ejected. The squadron returned to Virginia in February 1989.

VFA-32 appeared on an episode of CBS News 48 Hours entitled "Super Carrier - USS Kennedy."

=== 1990s ===
VF-32 F-14A prepares to refuel from a USAF KC-135

When Kuwait was invaded by Iraqi forces in August 1990, VF-32 joined Carrier Air Wing 3, was put on emergency recall from Nellis AFB and returned to NAS Oceana to prepare to sortie with Kennedy. Kennedy immediately proceeded to the Red Sea to participate in Operation Desert Shield alongside USS Saratoga. During Desert Shield, the ship made several Suez Canal transits and operated in the Eastern Mediterranean. When Desert Shield turned into Operation Desert Storm in January 1991, VF-32 Tomcats were in the first strike wave flying Combat Air Patrol mainly in central and western Iraq. VF-32 TARPS aircrews flew daily missions throughout Iraq including supersonic runs over highly defended Al Qa'im. Throughout Operation Desert Storm, VF-32 aircrew logged 1,445 combat flight hours on 403 missions, including 38 combat TARPS missions. After an eight-month deployment, the squadron returned to NAS Oceana on 28 March 1991. Later that year, the squadron won the 1991 AIRLANT Grand Slam missile firing competition with 17 of 17 scored kills.

VF-32 and John F. Kennedy again deployed in October 1992. The squadron conducted a great deal of air-to-ground operations in the Adriatic Sea while on cruise in support of Operation Provide Promise, marking the beginning of the Tomcat strike/fighter mission and provided significant carrier air patrol support for C-130 food drop missions in the former Yugoslavia. The squadron returned home to NAS Oceana in April 1993 and throughout the summer conducted joint exercises with the Air Force and was coined the first "Toms to Bomb" squadron to fully certify the use of bombs on the F-14 platform. The year was highlighted with presentations of the Battle "E" and Clifton Awards to VF-32.

In May 1994, VF-32 and CVW-3 embarked aboard USS Dwight D. Eisenhower. This four-week deployment marked the first extensive at-sea period where women worked alongside men on a fleet aircraft carrier. In September, a small detachment provided TARPS photography and air support for Operation Uphold Democracy in Haiti. In November 1994, VF-32 deployed aboard Dwight D. Eisenhower for another tour in the Mediterranean and the Indian Ocean. The squadron flew missions over Iraq in support of Operation Southern Watch and over Bosnia-Herzegovina in support of Operation Deny Flight. 1995 marked fifty years of service from the men and women of VF-32. In November 1996, VF-32 and CVW-3 deployed on board USS Theodore Roosevelt for another tour in support of Operation Deny Flight and Operation Southern Watch over Bosnia and Iraq. The squadron brought digital imagery to the TARPS mission through new cameras that could take up to two hundred digital images and was able to store them on board or transmit them to appropriately equipped ground or sea-based receivers up to 300 kilometers away, resulting in a near-real-time reconnaissance capability. The squadron received the Meritorious Unit Commendation for its cutting edge work with Digital TARPS. In August 1997, VF-32 began transitioning from the F-14A to F-14B. In February 1998, the squadron received the F-14B Upgrade.

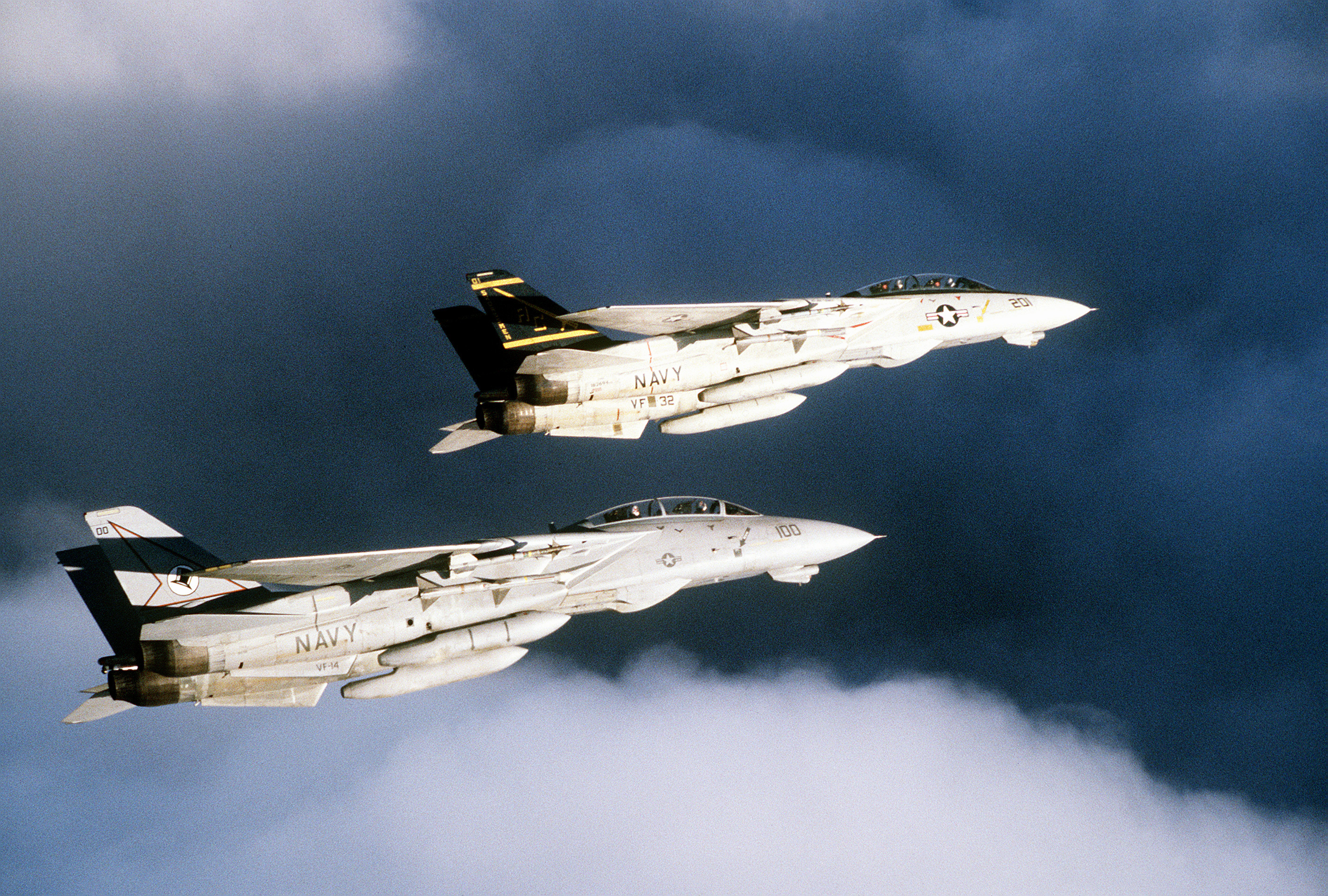
Sister squadrons VF-14 and VF-32 operating from USS John F. Kennedy

In November 1998, VF-32 and CVW-3 deployed aboard USS Enterprise to the Persian Gulf and Mediterranean Sea to support Operation Southern Watch and Operation Deliberate Force. With Iraq’s failure to cooperate with United Nations inspections of known weapon sites, Operation Desert Fox was launched on 16 December 1998. VF-32 took part in a 33-aircraft strike package on 16 December. The first night of the four-day operation was conducted by the US Navy only. Over four days, VF-32 expended 111,054 lb (50,373 kg) of ordnance during 16 strike missions and 38 sorties. During Desert Fox many Tomcat firsts were achieved, including the first GBU-24s dropped in combat by the US Navy, the first multiple GBU-24 drop by any platform in combat, the first combat use of the LANTIRN, the first autonomous F-14 delivery of a GBU-10/16/24, and the first F-14 use of Night Vision Devices in combat. The squadron returned home in May 1999.

=== 2000s ===
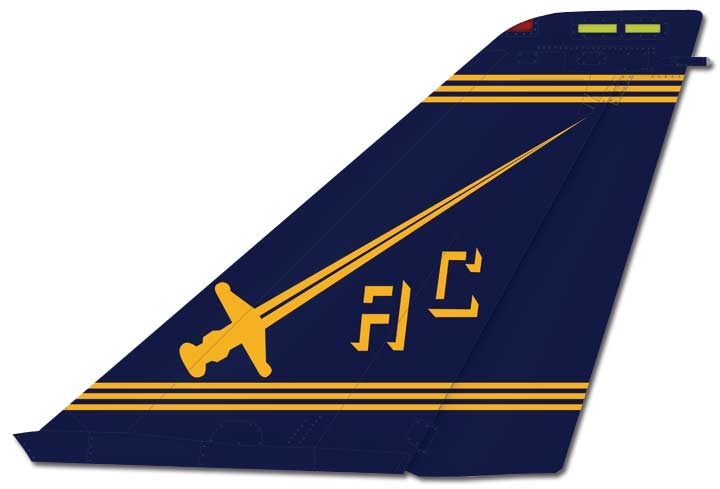
VF-32 F-14 tail markings

VF-32 deployed once again in November 2000 for the maiden voyage of the USS Harry S. Truman. They spent four months in support of Operation Southern Watch and returned home on 23 May 2001. In December 2002 VF-32 deployed once again on Harry S. Truman in support of Operation Noble Eagle and Operation Northern Watch.

In support of Operation Iraqi Freedom (OIF) in 2003, VF-32 was deployed to the Mediterranean Sea aboard Harry S. Truman. VF-32 flew strike missions and missions in support of US Special Forces on the ground. VF-32 was involved in the worst friendly fire incident of the war when on 6 April 2003 a squadron F-14 crew was cleared to attack an Iraqi tank near Dibakan, 30 miles (48 km) south east of Mosul. Instead, they mistakenly dropped a single laser-guided bomb on a vehicle convoy consisting of US Special Forces and Kurdish resistance fighters, killing 18 Kurdish fighters, 4 US soldiers and a BBC translator. An additional 80 people were wounded. An investigation following the war found that the pilot had been cleared to drop without the benefit of target coordinates provided by the Forward Air Controller, who was "operating under great stress" at the time. Overall, VF-32 flew 275 sorties and expended 247 laser-guided bombs and 118 JDAM. In January 2004 VF-32 became the first operational squadron to attempt the launch of six AIM-54 Phoenix missiles from one aircraft. A launch such as this had not been attempted since 1972. Five of the six active radar missiles were successfully launched. VF-32 returned to NAS Oceana in May 2003.

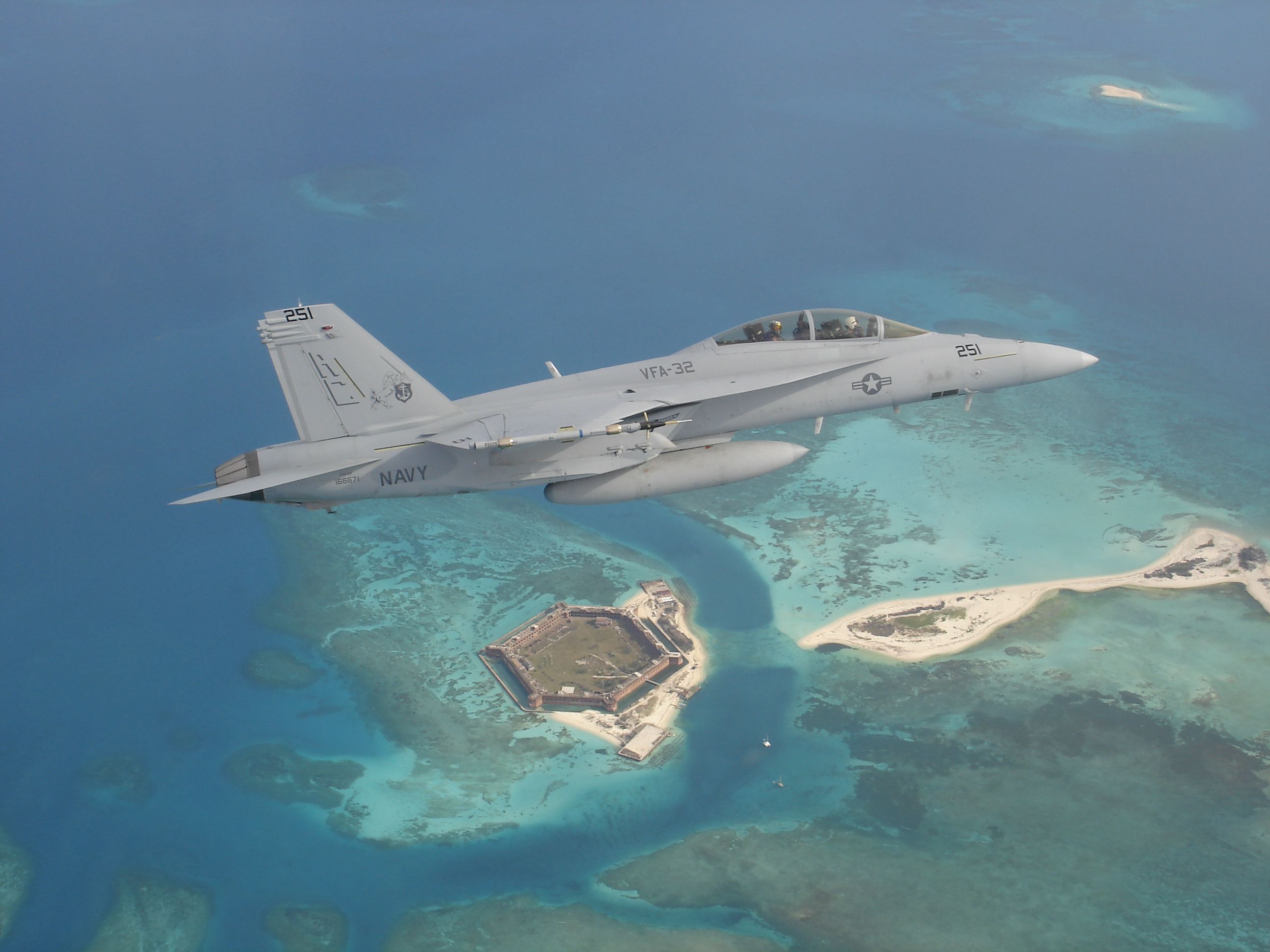
VFA-32 now operates the F/A-18F Super Hornet.

In 2004 VF-32 deployed again in support of OIF, becoming the first Naval squadron to redeploy in support of OIF. The squadron delivered multiple precision guided munitions on insurgent hideouts using the LANTIRN pod in the urban Close Air Support environment. This would be the squadron's final deployment with the F-14.

In October 2005, VF-32 transitioned to the F/A-18F Super Hornet and in November 2005 the squadron was designated Strike Fighter Squadron Thirty Two (VFA-32).

In November 2007, VFA-32 embarked on USS Harry S. Truman for their first F/A-18F Super Hornet cruise, deploying to the Persian Gulf. VFA-32 and the rest of CVW-3 returned home on 4 June 2008. VFA-32 was awarded the Battle Effectiveness Award for maintaining the highest state of battle readiness and sustained superior performance in February 2009.

Throughout the 2010s, VFA-32 saw numerous deployments and conducted extensive combat operations in the Middle East with their F/A-18Fs.

In October 2023, VFA-32 began a combat deployment within Air Wing Three onboard the USS Dwight D Eisenhower. The deployment focused heavily within the CENTCOM AOR. For the majority of the deployment, VFA-32 operated from the Red Sea. Constant combat operations against Houthi-Iranian military units in Yemen and over the Red Sea occurred during the deployment. VFA-32 was heavily involved in defensive and offensive operations against Houthi-Iranian drones, as well as fixed and mobile targets. At some point in this deployment, which ended on July 14, 2024, a woman in VFA-32 became the first American female pilot to engage and kill an air-to-air contact.

== VF-32 Awards ==
- Navy Expeditionary Medal, for 19-Oct-1962 to 23-Oct-1962, Cuban Missile Crisis.
- Armed Forces Expeditionary Medal, 24-Oct-1962 to 15-Nov-1962, Cuban Missile Crisis.
- Meritorious Unit Citation, 29-Sep-1970 to 31-Oct-1970.
- Navy E Ribbon, 01-Oct-1977 to 30-Sep-1978.
- Meritorious Unit Citation, 01-Dec-1977 to 01-Mar-1979.
- Navy E Ribbon, 01-Jan-1982 to 31-Dec-1982.
- Navy Expeditionary Medal, 20-Aug-1982 to 05-Sep-1982, Lebanon.
- Navy Expeditionary Medal, for several non-contiguous time periods from 01-Oct-1982 to 06-Dec-1982, Lebanon.
- Navy Unit Commendation, 20-Oct-1983 to 03-Mar-1984.
- Armed Forces Expeditionary Medal, 24-Oct-1983 to 02-Nov-1983, Grenada.
- Armed Forces Expeditionary Medal, 16-Nov-1983 to 02-Mar-1984, Lebanon.
- Meritorious Unit Citation, 01-Jul-1986 to 06-Jul-1986.
- Southwest Asia Service Medal, 14-Sep-1990 to 12-Mar-1991.
- Navy Unit Commendation, 17-Jan-1991 to 28-Feb-1991, Desert Storm.
- Armed Forces Service Medal, for several non-contiguous time periods beginning 22-Oct-1992 to 24-Mar-1993, Bosnia.
- Navy Unit Commendation, as a part of Dwight D. Eisenhower Battle Group, 01-Mar-1994 to 01-Apr-1995.
- Armed Forces Expeditionary Medal, 16-Sep-1994 to 22-Sep-1994, Operation Uphold Democracy Haiti.
- Armed Forces Service Medal, for several non-contiguous time periods from 15-Dec-1994 to 28-Mar-1995, Bosnia.
- Meritorious Unit Citation, 01-Nov-1995 to 30-Nov-1996.
- Navy Unit Commendation, as part of Enterprise Battle Group, 16-Dec-1998 to 20-Dec-1998.
- Combat Action Ribbon, as part of Eisenhower Strike Group, 19-Oct-2023 to TBD.
- Navy Unit Commendation, as part of Naval Forces Central Command, 19-Oct-2023 to 30-May-2024.

== VFA-32 Awards ==
- Navy E Ribbon, 01-Jan-2008 to 31-Dec-2008.
- Mutha Fighter Spirit Award, 26-May-2023.

== See also ==
- Naval aviation
- Modern US Navy carrier air operations
- Military aviation
- List of United States Navy aircraft squadrons

== Notes ==
- Tony Holmes (2005). US Navy F-14 Tomcat Units of Operation Iraqi Freedom, Osprey Publishing Limited.

The squadron did sustain combat losses in VietNam contrary to the information above. At least one A-4 was hit by a SAM and destroyed, an Rf-8 was lost on a photo mission and other aircraft were lost due to operational accidents not during combat on the cruise.

In the French-Belgian strip series Buck Danny, the squadron served as home unit for the protagonist and his two fellow pilots, Jerry Tumbler and Sonny Tuckson, during the trilogy 'Operation Apocalypsis', operating the F-14A Tomcat from the U.S.S. John F. Kennedy (CV-67). In the strip, 2 F-14s were stolen during an airshow at the fictitious Central American country of Managua.
