= Richard L. Cevoli =

US Navy pilot (1919–1955)

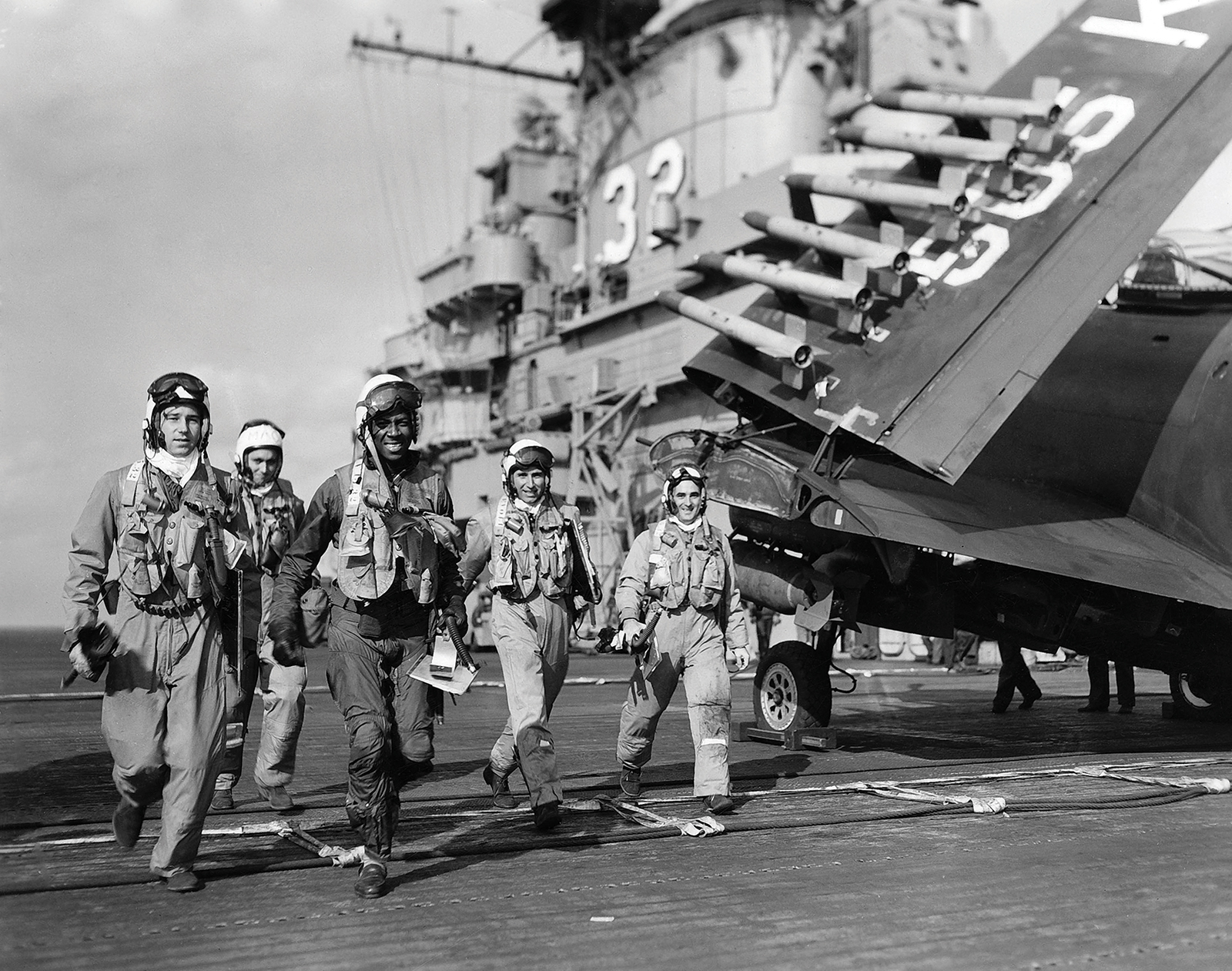
- Richard Cevoli and his aviators walk across the flight deck of the USS Leyte in November 1950.
- Born: October 24, 1919; East Greenwich, Rhode Island, U.S.
- Died: January 18, 1955 (aged 35); Duval County, Florida, U.S.
- Military career
- Allegiance: United States of America
- Branch: United States Navy
- Service years: 1941–1955
- Rank: Commander
- Nickname: Dick
- Commands: Squadron VF-73
- Conflicts: World War II; Battle of Leyte Gulf; Korean War
- Awards: Navy Cross; Distinguished Flying Cross (2); Air Medal (8)

Richard L. Cevoli (October 24, 1919 – January 18, 1955) served as a United States Naval Aviator and carrier fighter pilot during World War II and the Korean War. Decorated for valor in both conflicts, Cevoli reached the rank of Commander before he was killed in a plane crash in 1955.

== Pre-military ==
Richard Leo Cevoli was a lifelong resident of East Greenwich. He graduated from La Salle Academy and later from Rhode Island State College, where he earned a degree in civil engineering. He worked for the engineering firm, Merritt, Chapman & Scott, and joined the Navy a month after the attack on Pearl Harbor.

== Military career ==
=== World War II ===
While serving with Fighting Squadron 18 (VF-18) aboard the U.S.S. Intrepid, Cevoli and other members of the squadron strafed a Japanese battleship during the Battle of Leyte Gulf, silencing many of its guns. The following day, he scored a hit with a 500lb bomb, disabling the Japanese aircraft carrier Zuihō on 25 October 1944. Cevoli is also credited with four confirmed air victories and three probables during his service with VF-18.

=== Korean War ===
From 1949 until 1951, Cevoli served as the Executive Officer in Fighting Squadron 32 (VF-32) on board the USS Leyte. In the winter of 1950, he and his pilots provided close in air support against 70,000 Chinese soldiers crossing the Yalu River and enabled 30,000 United Nations soldiers to escape encirclement. He was also division leader for Thomas J. Hudner Jr. and Jesse L. Brown. He radioed for help when Brown was shot down on 4 December 1950, during the mission for which Hudner would receive the Medal of Honor. The story of Brown and Hudner's friendship and service is the subject of Adam Makos' book Devotion, which was subsequently turned into a feature film. Thomas Sadoski was cast to play Richard Cevoli.

=== Post-war service ===
After the war, Cevoli graduated from the Naval War College. In 1954 he assumed command of Fighting Squadron 73 (VF-73) and attained the rank of Commander. He was killed during a training mission on January 18, 1955, when his F9F-6 Cougar jet crashed into a forest shortly after takeoff from Jacksonville, Florida.

== Awards and honors ==
- Navy Cross
- Distinguished Flying Cross with one gold award star
- Air Medal with 7 gold award stars
- Rhode Island Aviation Hall of Fame - 2005
- A post office in East Greenwich was named after him - 2006

== See also ==
http://twoaday18.com/2019/05/27/two-a-day-tales-richard-cevoli/
