= VF-18 =

Fighting Squadron 18
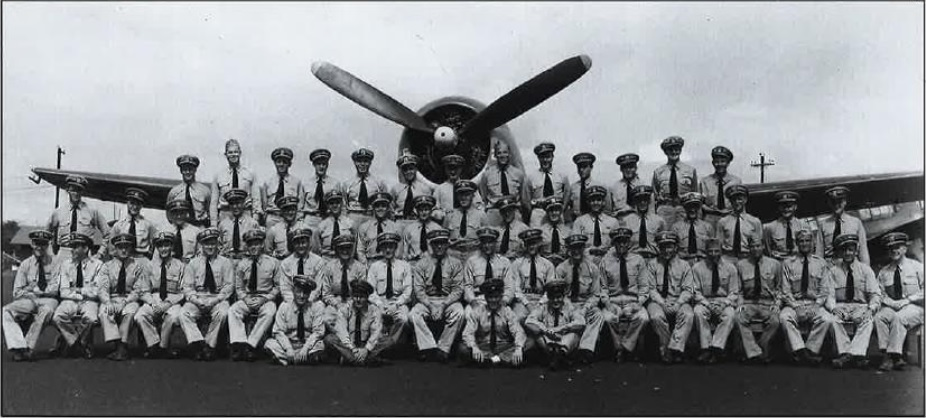
- The officers of Fighting 18 in Hawaii circa May 1944
- Active: 1944–1945
- Country: United States
- Branch: US Navy
- Type: Fighter Squadron
- Part of: United States Third Fleet
- Nickname: Two-a-Day 18
- Engagements: World War II: Formosa Air Battle; Battle of Leyte Gulf
- Skipper: Edward J. Murphy

Insignia
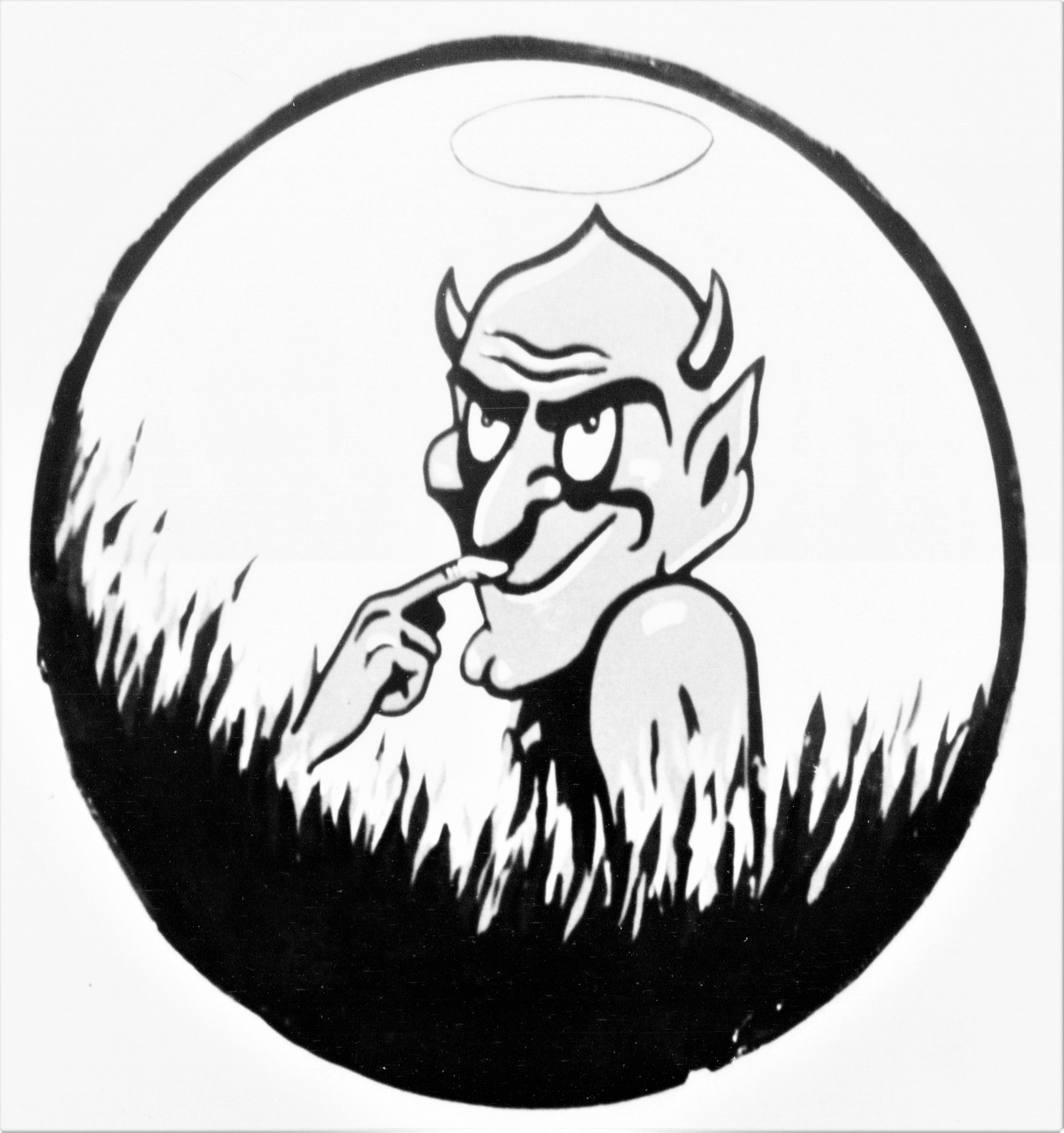
- "The Fickle Finger"

Aircraft flown
- Fighter: F6F-3/5 Hellcat

Service record
- Victories: 172 aircraft shot down in aerial combat; 208 aircraft destroyed or damaged on the ground; 1 destroyer sunk, 1 beached and 3 assists to CAG-18 bombers; Bomb hits/strafing damage on 1 Shōkaku-class aircraft carrier, 1 Yamato-class battleship, 1 Kongo-class battleship; further damage to 6 battleships, 8 heavy cruisers, 5 light cruisers and 12 destroyers; 31 merchant ships definitely sunk

Fighting Squadron 18 (VF-18) was an aviation unit of the United States Navy which served aboard USS Intrepid (CV-11) in the fall of 1944. It was the second squadron to bear the designation VF-18.

Over the course of two and a half months of strike operations from 6 September to 25 November 1944, Fighting 18 provided air support for the amphibious invasion of Peleliu; fought in the last major air battle in the Pacific; and shared responsibility for locating and launching the first strikes against the Imperial Japanese Navy's primary battleship fleet during the Battle of Leyte Gulf.

Upon returning to the United States, Fighting 18 was widely mentioned in the press for its success in combat and subsequently given the nickname 'Two-a-Day 18' for the number of enemy aircraft its pilots destroyed. The squadron's leading ace and the Navy's second-highest scoring fighter pilot, Cecil Harris, also received significant press attention.

Fighting 18 is recognized today as the fourth-highest scoring Grumman F6F Hellcat squadron of World War II.

== Background ==
Fighting Squadron 18 was established on 15 October 1942 as "Escort Scouting Squadron" 18 (VGS-18). On 1 March 1943 it was redesignated "Composite Squadron" 18 (VC-18) and on 15 August 1943 it was redesignated Fighting Squadron 36 and intended for land-based duty. On 5 March 1944 it was redesignated Fighting Squadron 18 and slotted into Air Group 18 during training in Hawaii since Dive Bombing and Torpedo Bombing Squadron 18 were without an accompanying fighting squadron. The completed air group boarded USS Intrepid on 16 August 1944. After the end of the war on 15 November 1946 the squadron was redesignated VF-7A, then on 28 July 1948 it was redesignated VF-71 (it was the second squadron to bear that designation) and it was ultimately disestablished on 31 March 1959.

== Operational history ==
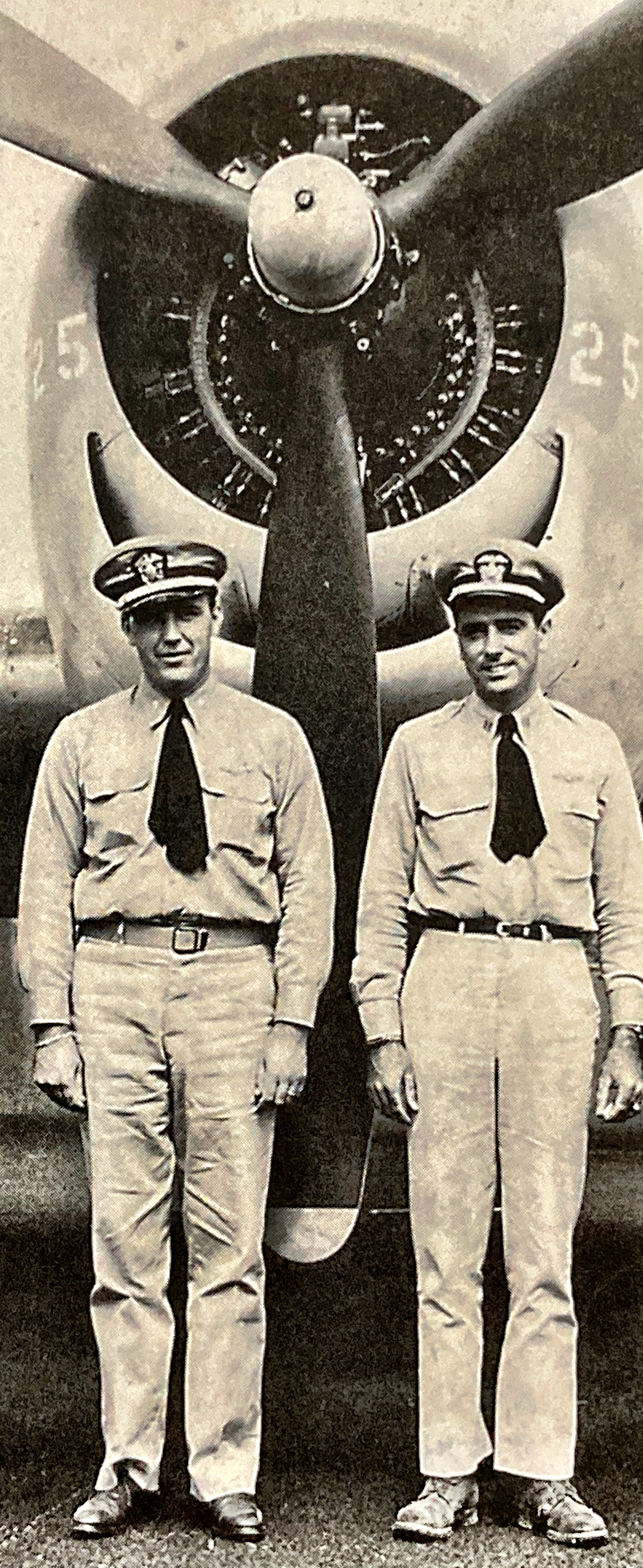
VF-18 Skipper Ed Murphy and XO Clarence Blouin

=== September ===
Intrepid operated as part of Task Group 38.2, one of four carrier groups under the overall command of Admiral William Halsey Jr. Strike operations commenced 6 September 1944 against Babelthuap, the largest island in the Palau archipelago. By the morning of 8 September there were no remaining targets of value, so Intrepid moved due west to Mindanao to launch strikes on the island's largest city, Davao City. Throughout this period, combat was characterized by fighter-bomber missions and bomber escort. Only a few enemy planes rose in opposition to the initial strikes on the Palaus and Mindanao, including one Mitsubishi Ki-46 "Dinah" reconnaissance aircraft shot down on 10 September by Harvey P. Picken and William H. Murray. VF-18 aircraft were damaged during these line periods but neither planes nor pilots were lost.

The intensity of strike operations—both in terms of pace and ferocity—increased markedly as Intrepid sent planes northward to the Visayas. An enemy convoy was attacked on 12 September and the first real air combat was joined the next day over Negros Island. Eight Japanese fighters were claimed shot down by the squadron. Four of these were credited to Cecil Harris, making him the squadron's first ace. Fighting 18 also suffered its first pilot killed in action (KIA) on 13 September when Lt. James B. Neighbours had the tail of his Hellcat blown off by anti-aircraft fire.

On 17 September, Intrepid returned to the Palaus to launch strikes on Angaur and Peleliu in support of Marine landings. Fighting 18 experimented with the use of napalm bombs made out of empty belly fuel tanks, but these proved ineffective. Aircraft Action Reports from the Palaus and Visayas and reminiscences in the squadron's War History show that the Japanese were being rapidly overwhelmed in these areas:

"COMTHIRD Fleet characterized the enemy's non-aggressive attitude as "unbelievable and fantastic." ...thus far there has been no evidence of Jap retaliation for our attacks on them."

These observations, along with reports from Thomas Cato Tillar Sr., an aviator aboard USS Hornet (CV-12), led Allied powers to advance their timetable for the invasion of Leyte from the end of the year to 20 October 1944.

The ensuing change of pace caught the Japanese off-guard. On the morning of 21 September, TG 38.2 launched the first carrier strike against central Luzon since the fall of the Philippines. No enemy aircraft were encountered early on due to the element of surprise, but Japanese fighter aircraft were scrambled to heavily contest the rest of the day's strikes. Twenty-five Japanese planes were claimed shot down by VF-18 over the course of the day. One pilot assigned to photo-reconnaissance, Lt.(jg) Charles Mallory, was credited with shooting down five Japanese planes, making him an ace-in-a-day. When he returned to Intrepid, his plane captain counted 67 bullet holes in his Hellcat. Overall, operations on 21 and 22 September were considered "extremely effective" by Vice Admiral George D. Murray, commander of the Navy's Pacific air forces.

=== October ===
On 1 October 1944 Admiral Gerald Bogan and his staff came aboard Intrepid, designating it the flagship of Task Group 38.2. After proceeding to refuel and re-provision at Ulithi, TG 38.2 returned to combat operations on 10 October using a typhoon to cover the ships' approach to the Ryukyu Islands. The ensuing strikes were the first launched against the Ryukyus during the war. As with the strikes against Luzon the previous month, these caught the Japanese by surprise. VF-18 activity included a fighter sweep over Okinawa Island, participation in full air group strikes, and photo reconnaissance. Shipping and airfields in the vicinity were seriously damaged or destroyed with virtual impunity. The Imperial Japanese Navy responded to this sudden attack by implementing their plan for a decisive battle with Allied naval forces, starting with the activation of their remaining air forces.

==== Formosa ====
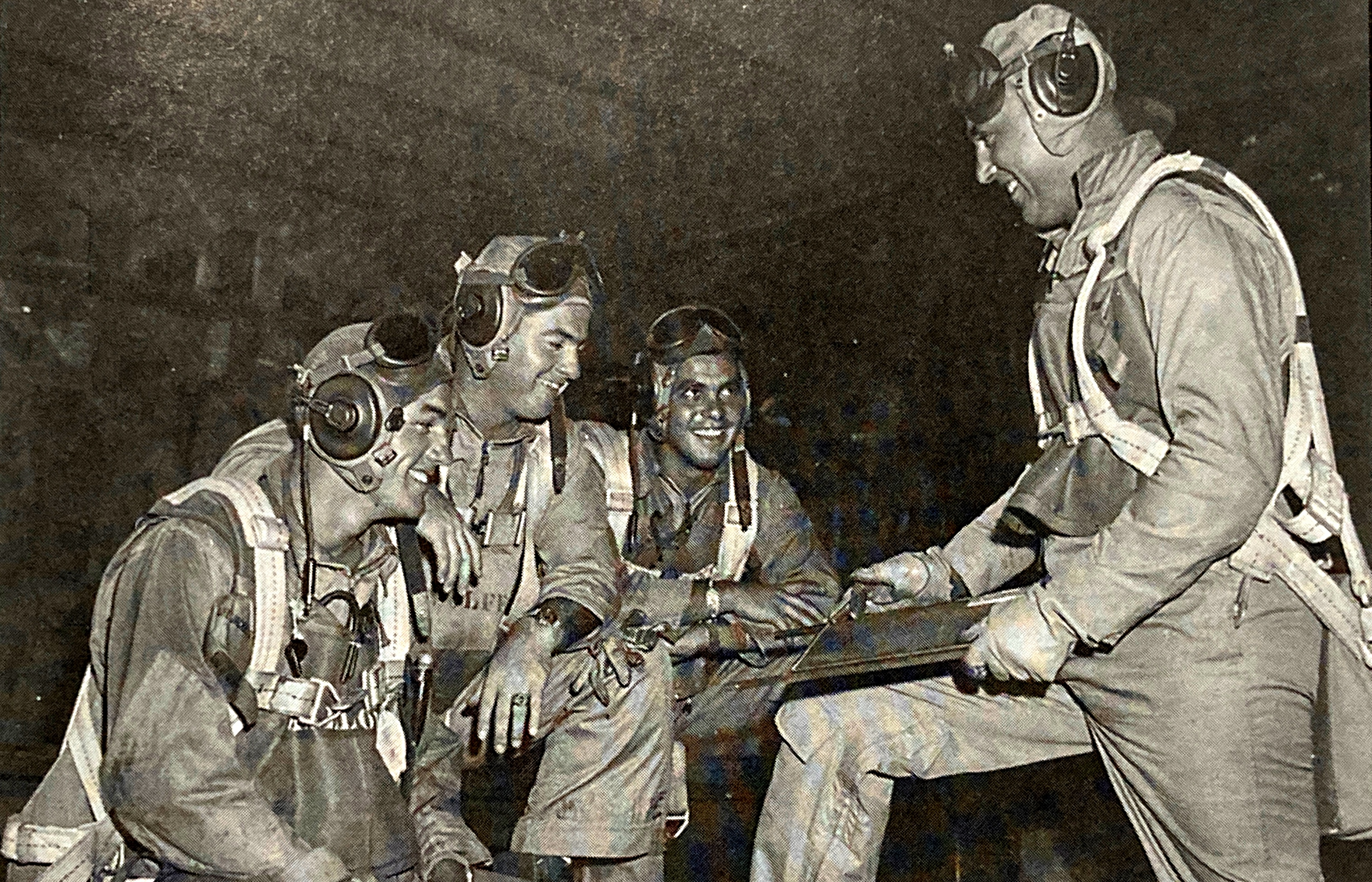
Skipper Ed Murphy briefs his pilots before a strike

On 12 October, TG 38.2 launched fighter sweeps over northern Formosa to destroy Japanese air power in advance of the amphibious invasion of the Philippines. The Japanese were on alert after carrier strikes on the Ryukyus and responded by committing hundreds of aircraft to protect the island's air bases and to destroy Halsey's carriers. Fighting 18's youngest pilot, Arthur Mollenhauer, shot down five Japanese planes in rapid succession during his first encounter with the enemy. The newly christened ace was interviewed aboard Intrepid by Baltimore Sun war correspondent Philip Heisler and Honolulu Star-Advertiser reporter Ray Coll, and had his likeness and story printed in newspapers nationwide. Cecil Harris destroyed four Japanese planes and helped fellow pilot Egidio DiBatista escape an attack by enemy fighters. DiBatista was forced to bail out of his damaged aircraft close to the fleet. Though he broke his leg during the fall, he ultimately survived the mission. Harris and Mollenhauer had their picture taken the following day by an Associated Press photographer. Their combined nine victories earned them features in newspapers around the country.

Despite this success, the squadron also suffered significant losses over Formosa. Fighting 18 was assigned to fly low cover during the morning's sweep, which meant it was the first squadron to bomb targets on the ground. As a result, pilots were exposed to the full force of ground-based anti-aircraft fire and left at an altitude disadvantage against Japanese fighters attacking from above. Fighting was so fierce that returning pilots recalled seeing parachutes opening throughout the engagement as more and more planes were destroyed. In addition to DiBatista, three other VF-18 pilots were shot down: Ralph DuPont, Isaac Keels and William Ziemer. DuPont and Keels were ultimately ruled KIA; Ziemer died in a Japanese prison camp less than two weeks before the announcement of Japan's surrender. A fourth pilot, Harry Webster, ran out of fuel near the task group and was forced to make a water landing. He was unable to escape his sinking plane and drowned.

The air battle continued over the course of the next four days. In addition to strike missions against Formosa itself, pilots assigned to combat air patrol (CAP) turned back wave after wave of attack by Japanese bombers. On 14 October in particular, VF-18 pilots rebuffed an attack by approximately 30 enemy aircraft. Squadron members were credited with a total of 23 Japanese planes shot down. Three of these were claimed by Cecil Harris, making him one of the country's leading aces with 13 enemy planes to his name.

==== Battle of Leyte Gulf ====
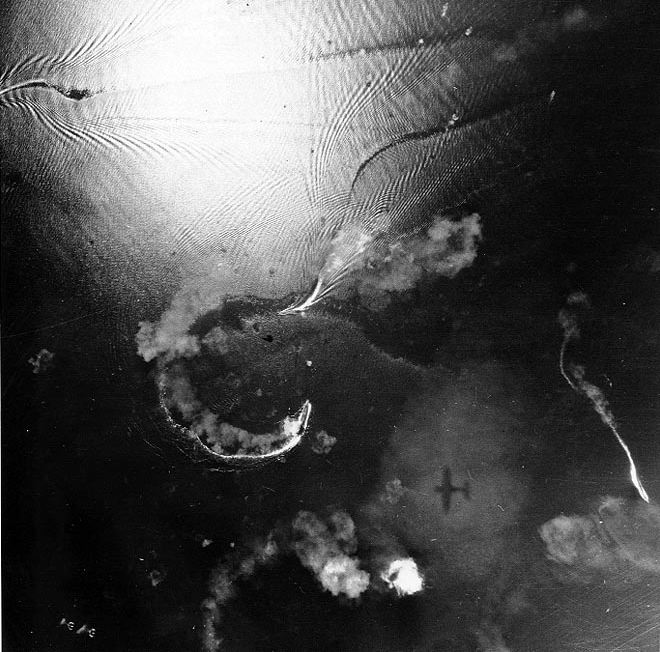
Admiral Kurita's battleship force under attack by carrier aircraft

Fighting 18 next attacked airfields in northern Luzon on 18 October. Theses strikes were designed to suppress what was left of Japanese air power while Allied troops secured the small islands at the mouth of Leyte Gulf. That same day, Admiral Takeo Kurita sortied with his battleship force to oppose the nascent Allied invasion of the Philippines. He was spotted the night of 23 October by submarines USS Darter (SS-227) and USS Dace (SS-247), beginning the Battle of Leyte Gulf.

The next morning at 0600, Admiral Bogan sent out sector searches to locate Kurita's battleship force. A team from Intrepid which included VB-18 pilot Russell "Max" Adams and rear seater Cornelius Clark, as well as Fighting 18 pilots Donald Watts and Charles Amerman, was the first to successfully spot, identify and broadcast information about Kurita's forces. Watts sent the message that ultimately reached Halsey: "13DD, 4BB, 8CA off the south tip of Mindoro, course 050, speed 10 to 12 knots. No train or transports." With this information in Hand, Halsey gave Bogan the order, "Strike repeat Strike. Good luck."

Bogan's TG 38.2 was at that moment the weakest of the four carrier groups, with only one fleet carrier (Intrepid) and one light carrier (USS Cabot (CVL-28)) available to contribute aircraft. It was however the only carrier group close enough to immediately launch aircraft. As a result, the first two strikes against Admiral Kurita's forces were composed entirely of planes from Intrepid and Cabot. Fighting 18 pilots escorted bombers through intense anti-aircraft fire and strafed enemy ships to draw gunfire. Later in the day, after dealing considerable damage to Admiral Kurita's forces, Halsey received word of a Japanese carrier force to the north. The decision was made to bring the full strength of his forces north to engage the IJN's flattops. Intrepid was designated the battle-line carrier for the ensuing operations.

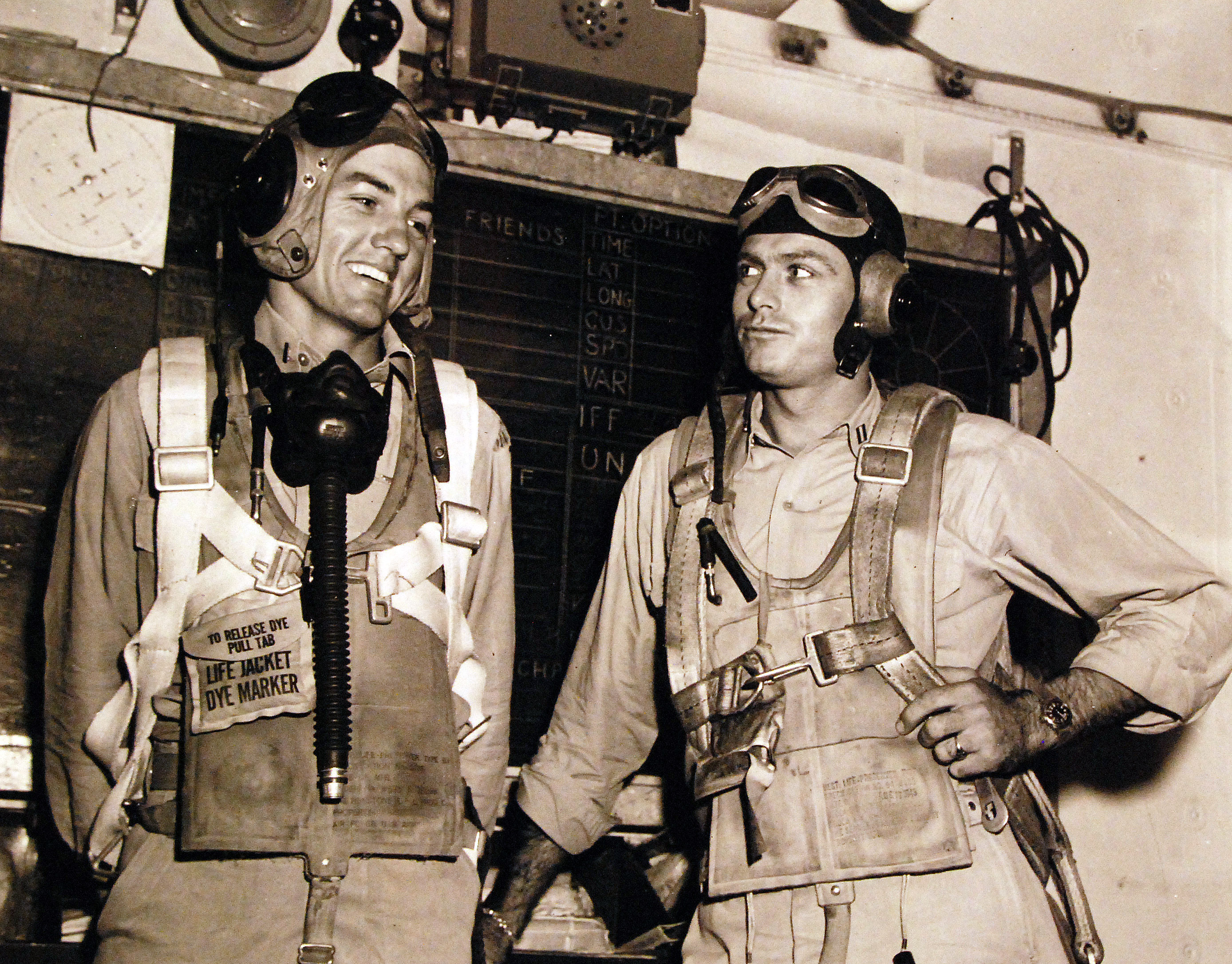
VF-18 aces Charles Mallory (left) and Cecil Harris (right)

On the morning of 25 October, Fighting 18 pilots once again escorted bombers on sector searches to locate Admiral Jisaburō Ozawa's carrier force. Searches for the main force were negative, though VF-18 pilot Frederick Wolff located and bombed a separate group of destroyers. Full strikes from Intrepid and other carriers arrived around 0830 over Ozawa's forces. VF-18 pilots recorded 1 near miss (Donald Watts) and 2 probable hits (Charles Amerman, Richard Cevoli) on a light carrier as well as 1 hit (Frederick Tracy) on the IJN's last remaining carrier veteran of Pearl Harbor, Zuikaku. Though a second strike was ready, the urgent messages reaching Admiral Halsey from Task Force 77 caused him to break off his battleships with Intrepid again as the battle-line carrier. This force sped south to try to catch Admiral Kurita as he once more retreated through San Bernardino Strait.

Halsey's battleships arrived after midnight, too late to engage Kurita's fleeing forces. Intrepid was able to launch one strike that reached Kurita before his ships moved out of range. Fighting 18 pilots strafed and bombed enemy vessels but inflicted only slight damage. Replacement pilot Harold Meacham was lost sometime during this strike. At the end of the battle, VF-18 and its air group had participated in five strikes, including the first and last launched over the course of the multi-day engagement.

==== The First Kamikazes ====
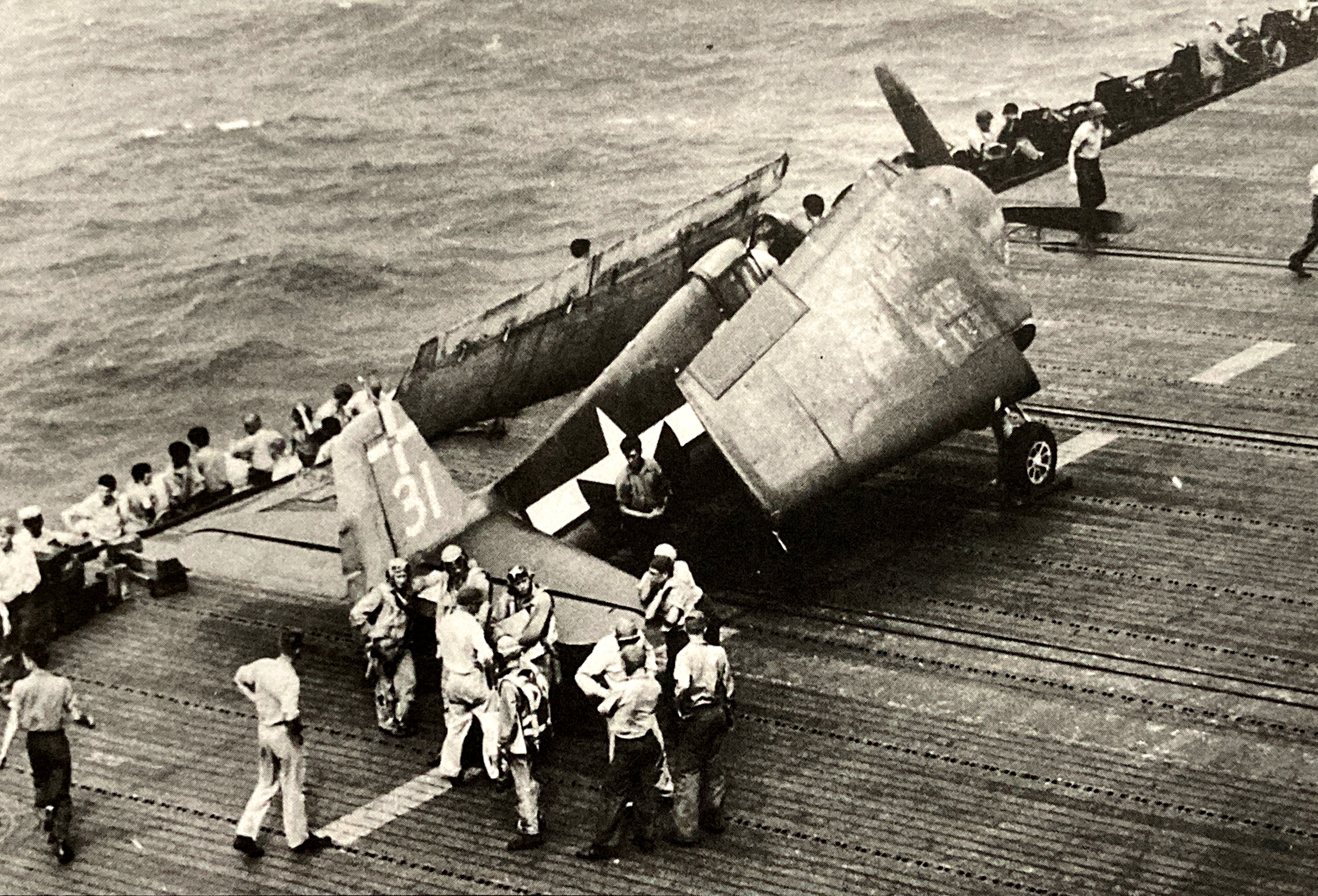
VF-18 Hellcat prior to launch on 29 October 1944

Fighting 18 and Intrepid remained in the Leyte area through 28 October, providing strategic support for the invasion of Leyte. VF-18 pilot George Griffith was killed on this date when his engine quit on takeoff, causing his plane to fall into the path of the ship. Afterward, Intrepid moved north to strike Luzon. Kamikaze tactics had recently been officially introduced by Japan, turning all available airfields in the Philippines into credible threats against Allied naval forces. As a result, a concerted effort was made starting 29 October to destroy Japanese planes on the ground and to render these fields inoperable.

Though the morning fighter sweep over Bulan field did not find targets of value, strikes on Clark Field on 29 October were met with fierce resistance by dozens of Japanese fighters. Unlike reports of previous encounters denigrating the skill and fighting spirit of Japanese pilots, an action report from 29 October states, "The Japs were aggressive and seemed much better tacticians than enemy pilots previously encountered." Japanese aircraft in these engagements also included later model, better protected and more heavily armed fighter types, like the Mitsubishi J2M, nicknamed "Jack" by the Allies.

At 1204, a Japanese plane intentionally dove on Intrepid. The plane was hit by anti-aircraft fire on the way in, scattering flame and debris across Gun Tub #10. The impact and ensuing fires killed 10 members of the gun crew and burned others. Afterward, Admiral Bogan aboard Intrepid decided to move his ships into an oncoming squall to prevent further attack by Japanese air forces.

VF-18 pilot Robert Hurst flew the first and last strikes of the day, shooting down a combined five enemy planes to become an ace-in-a-day. Cecil Harris scored four. On afternoon CAP, Robert Davis was vectored out to a bogie by Intrepid fighter director officer Bill "Jeep" Daniels. Davis found the aircraft, an Aichi D3A "Val" dive bomber, and shot it down before a difficult return to the ship through "the most severe wall of rain" he had ever seen.

Three VF-18 pilots were lost over the course of the day. Daniel Naughton and Arthur Mollenhauer were both shot down during the day's first strike. Naughton ultimately made it to friendly forces in the Philippines, but Mollenhauer was never seen again. William Thompson, on the third strike of the day, and James Hedrick, on CAP with Robert Davis, were unable to find Intrepid through the storm mentioned above. Both pilots were forced to make water landings; neither were ever found.

=== November ===
By November, Fighting 18 was "depleted and exhausted" after two months of continuous operations. The squadron continued to fly anti-kamikaze CAP and SNASP missions, and lightly-contested strikes against targets on Luzon. Encounters with enemy aircraft were fewer and the quality of remaining Japanese pilots lower. Though some VF-18 pilots were shot down in November, including Charles DeMoss and James (Buck) Newsome, they were all later reported safe with Allied forces.

On 4 November, air group commander (CAG) William Edward Ellis took over as Intrepid's Air Officer. He was replaced as CAG the following week by Wilson M. Coleman, who was previously in command of Fighting Squadron 13 aboard USS Franklin (CV-13). Coleman had witnessed damage done to Franklin by kamikaze attacks in October. As a result, he instituted a policy aboard Intrepid that all air group personnel clear squadron ready rooms during general quarters and relocate to wardrooms below the ship's armored hangar deck.

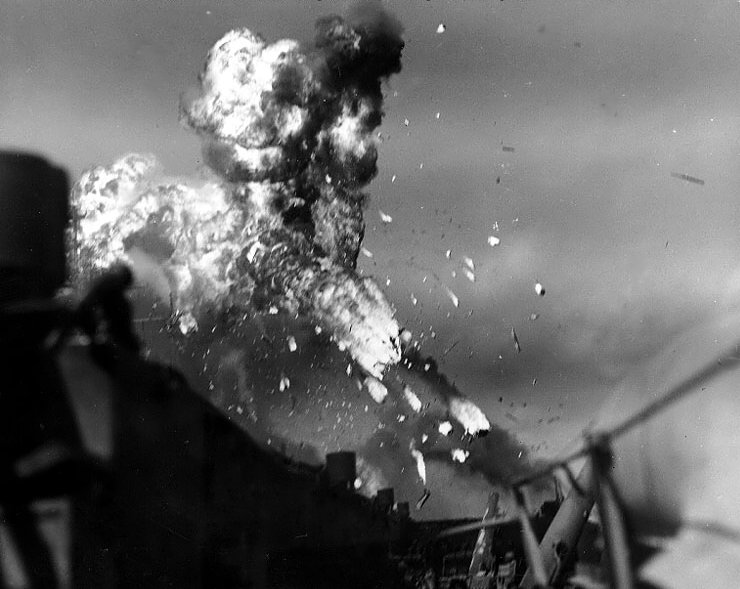
Impact of kamikaze on USS Intrepid

Intrepid suffered serious damage as a result of two back-to-back kamikaze attacks on 25 November 1944. The attacks occurred just prior to 1300, as Intrepid was launching its third strike of the day. VF-18 pilot Charles Mallory was in the cockpit of his Hellcat in the hangar deck when general quarters alarms sounded. Though flight operations were suspended, he refused to turn off his engine and convinced plane handlers to help him reach the flight deck. He recalled being the last pilot to take off from Intrepid before the first kamikaze struck. None of the men of Fighting 18 were killed in the ensuing blasts, though the squadron's Air Combat Intelligence Officer, Harry Cropper, suffered second degree burns to his face and extremities. The attacks ultimately claimed the lives of 69 officers and men aboard Intrepid.

Due to the significant damage to their ship, VF-18 pilots from the day's second strike were forced to land on other nearby carriers, including USS Ticonderoga (CV-14) and USS Essex (CV-9). Pilots on the more recently launched third strike were able to fly out to Leyte, where they could stay overnight before returning to the fleet anchorage at Ulithi. Despite efforts on the part of its members and affiliated command staff to keep the whole air group together, on 30 November 1944 VF-18 was detached from Air Group 18 to be retained in theater aboard USS Hancock (CV-19).

The squadron was disestablished on 20 December 1944.

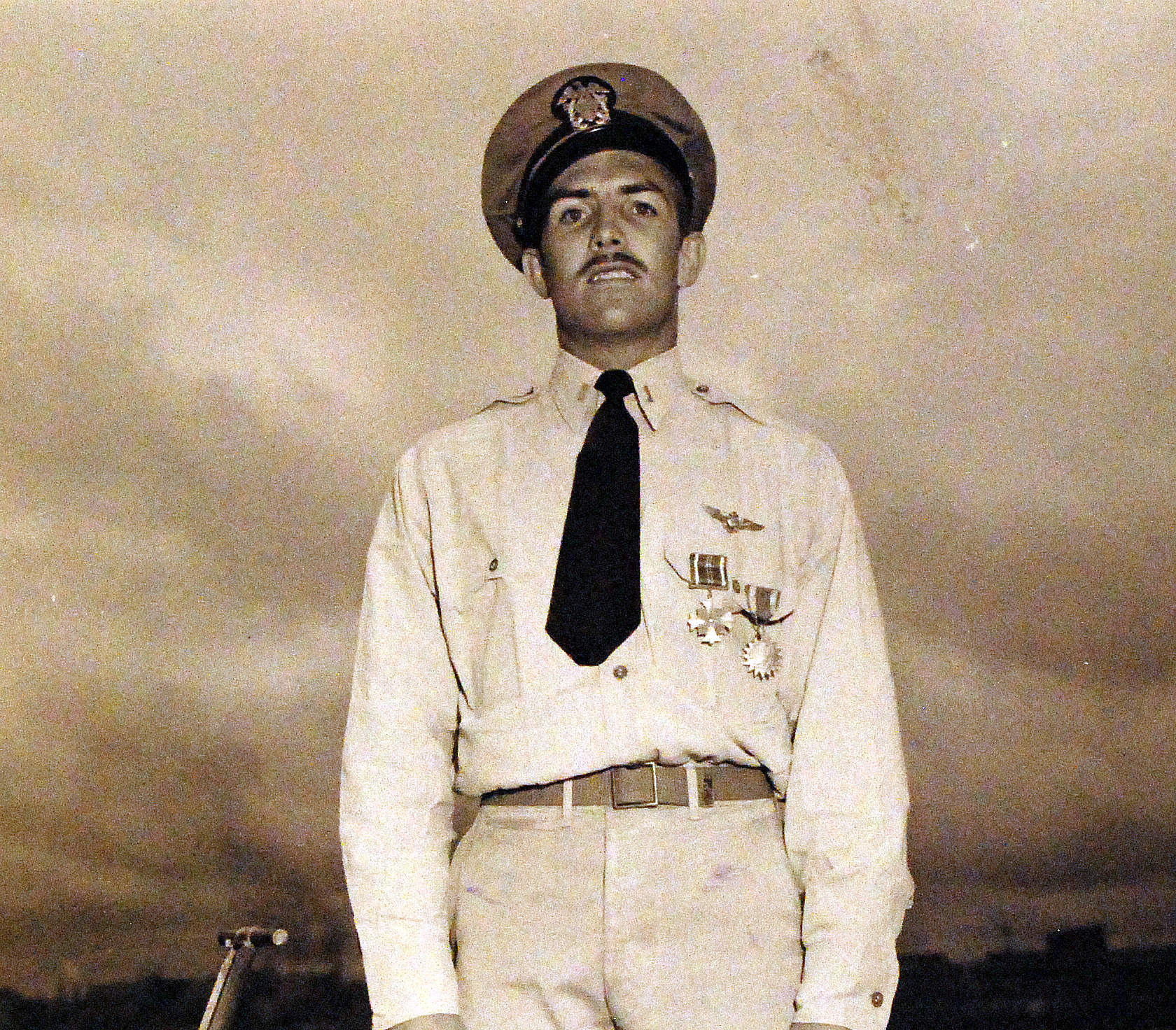
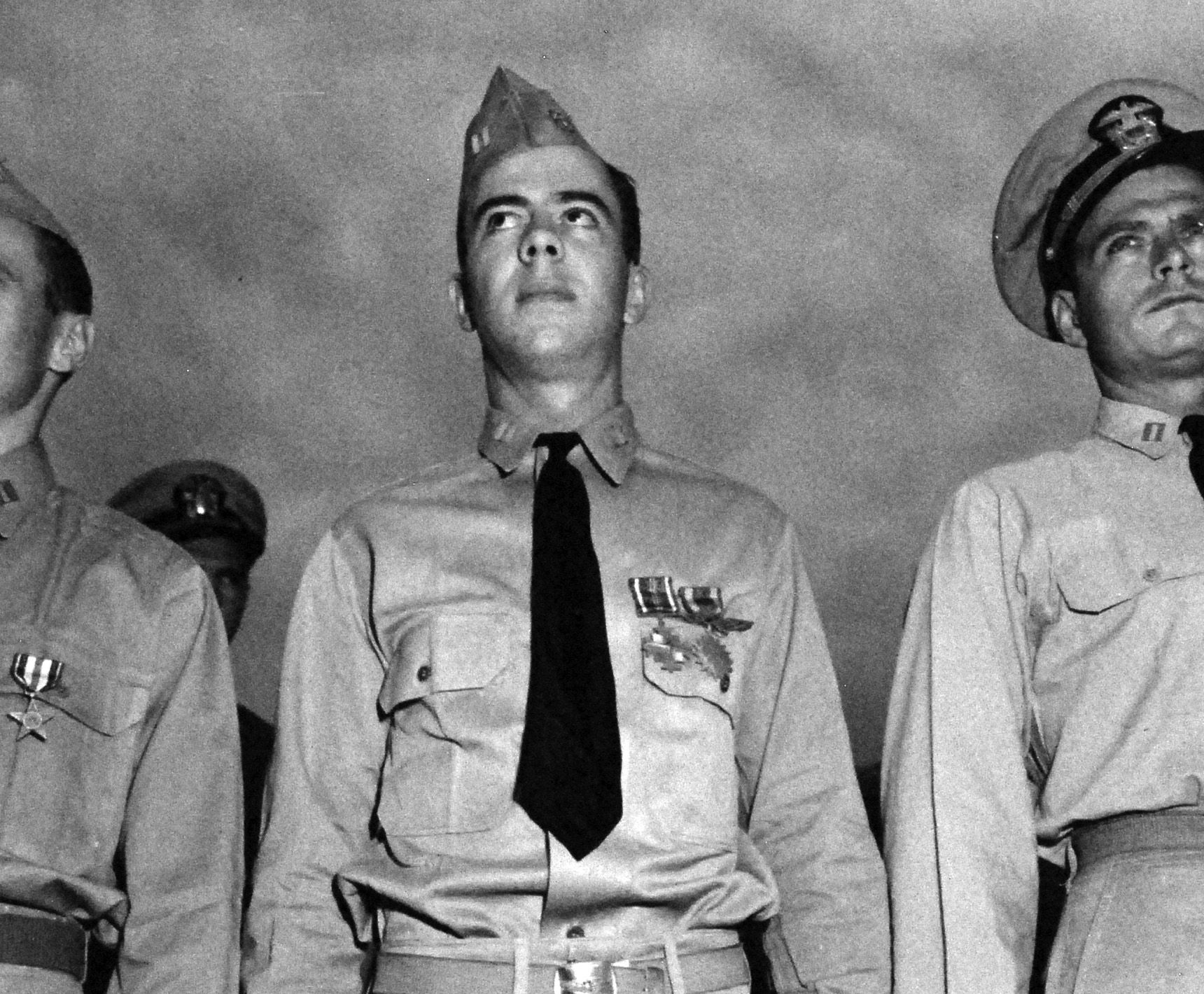
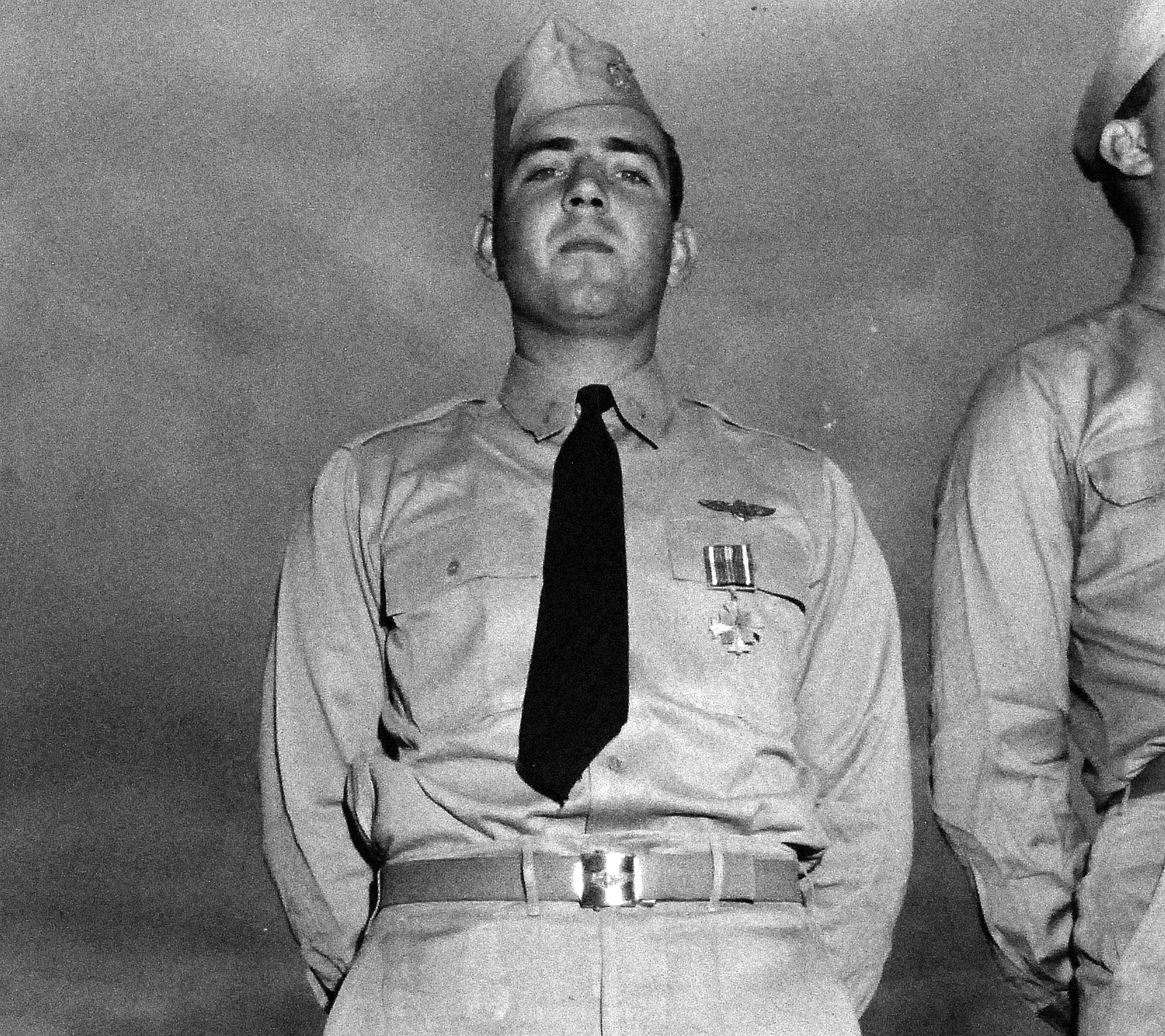
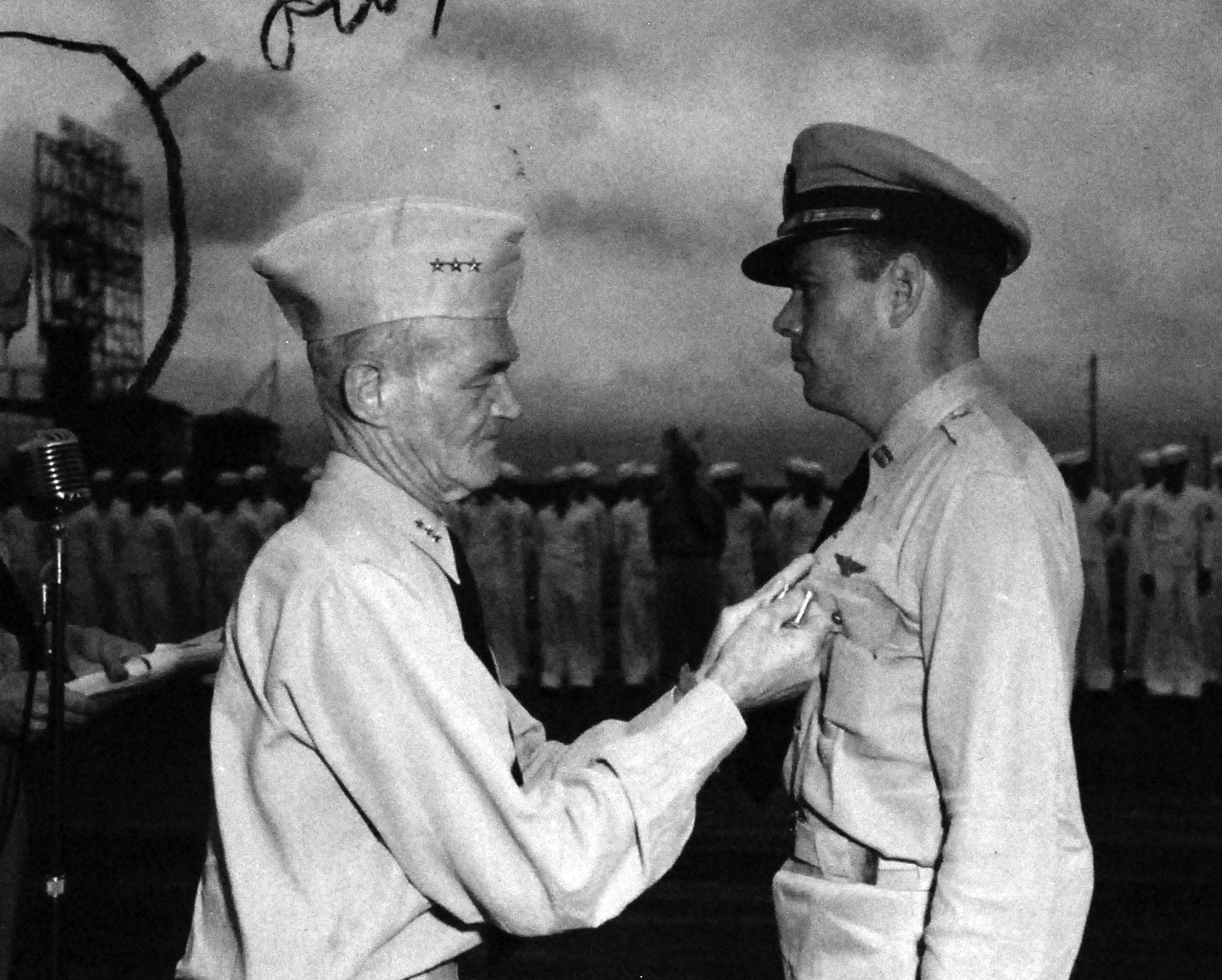
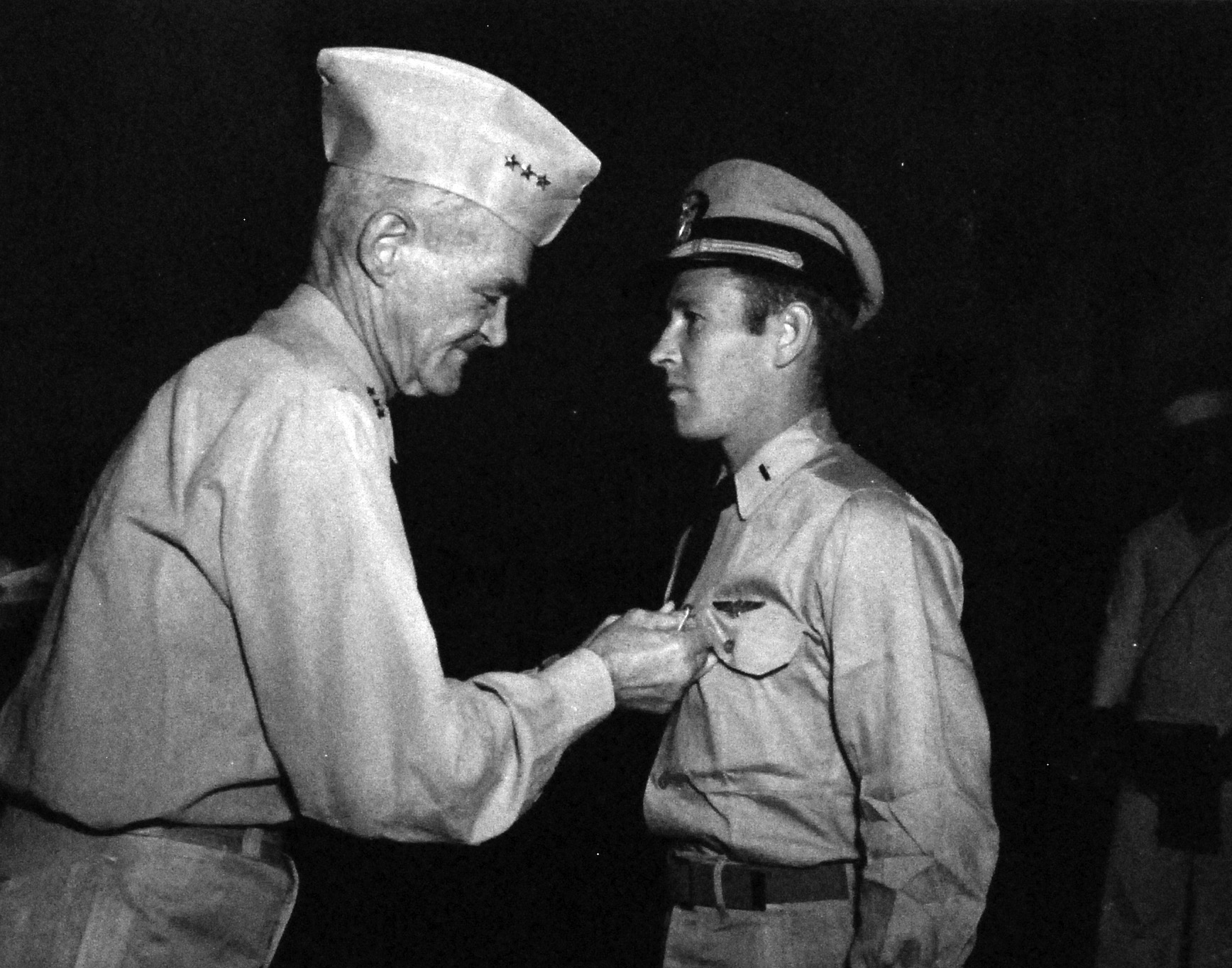
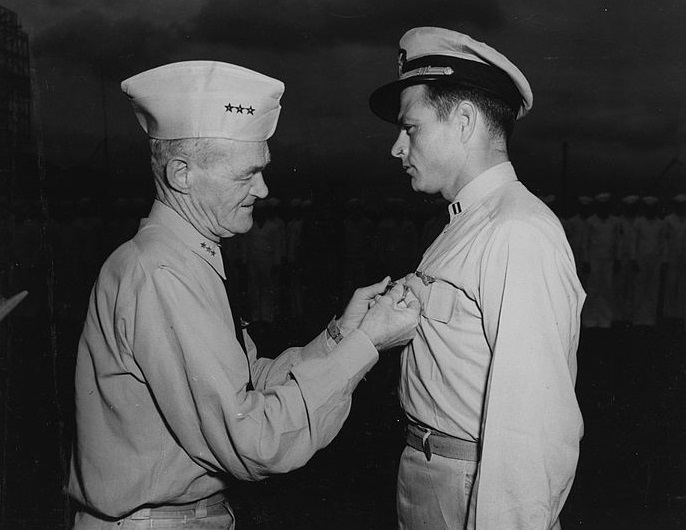
Pilots of VF-18 being pinned with medals in early 1945

== Reformation ==
On 25 January 1945, after VF-18's veterans received their allotted home leave, the squadron was reformed at Naval Air Station Astoria in Oregon. Twenty-four pilots who had been with VF-18 aboard Intrepid returned to the squadron. According to the squadron's War History, "It is generally believed that this was the highest percentage of combat experienced pilots with any reformed squadron." Newly graduated cadets were folded in for training, which brought the squadron from Astoria to NAS San Diego in April. In May, VF-18 qualified during day carrier operations aboard USS Ranger (CV-4), and in August 1945 they received the first complement of Grumman F8F Bearcat fighters to replace their F6F Hellcats. Less than one month later the war officially ended, leading to the disestablishment of VF-18.

== Legacy ==
The squadron's return from the front was heralded in the press with headlines like "Crack Carrier Squadron Rests" and "Much Decorated Squadron Home." Cecil Harris went on a publicity tour to Grumman's Bethpage facility and the Museum of Science and Industry in New York City. Today, the exploits of Fighting Squadron 18 are incorporated into displays at the Intrepid Sea, Air & Space Museum, in the hangar deck of the decommissioned aircraft carrier. Cecil Harris has a plaque dedicated to him at Patriots Point and a statue at his alma mater, Northern State University.

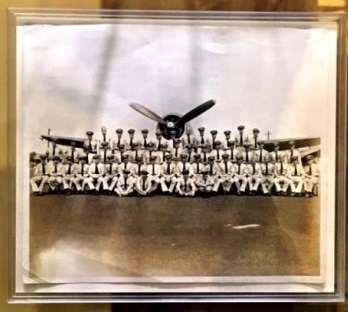
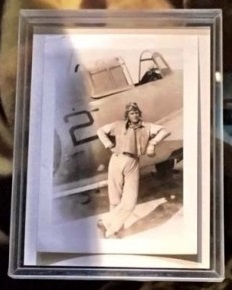
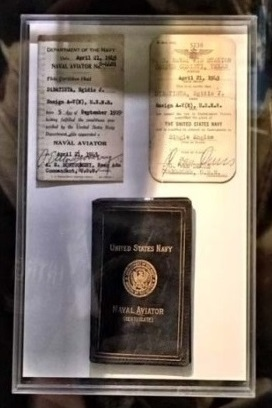
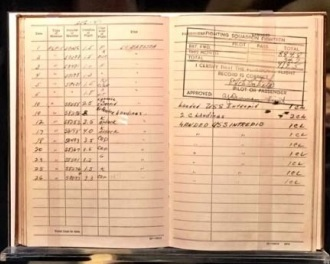
VF-18 Artifacts Displayed at the Intrepid Museum

== See also ==
- USS Intrepid (CV-11)
- Grumman F6F Hellcat
- List of World War II aces from the United States
- List of inactive United States Navy aircraft squadrons
- List of United States Navy aircraft squadrons
