= Thomas Cato Tillar Sr. =

American naval aviator

- Born: January 16, 1924; Emporia, Virginia
- Died: December 9, 2003 (aged 79); Emporia, Virginia
- Military career
- Allegiance: United States of America
- Branch: United States Navy
- Service years: 1943-1946
- Rank: Lieutenant
- Nickname: “C.T”
- Commands: Fighting 2 VF-2; VF-11 Air Group 2
- Conflicts: World War II: Pacific War; Philippines Campaign (1944–45)
- Awards: Distinguished Flying Cross (5) Air Medal

Lieutenant Thomas Cato Tillar (January 16, 1924 - December 9, 2003) was an American naval aviator of the United States Navy who on September 12, 1944 by the words of President Roosevelt hastened the liberation of the Philippines and the final days of victory.

== Early life and education ==
Thomas Cato Tillar was born in Emporia, Virginia to Benjamin Flournoy Tillar and Mable F. Cato.

Thomas enrolled in Virginia Polytechnic Institute in the fall of 1941 from Emporia, Virginia. He was in N Battery on the Upper Quad and was among those who became Private first class in his sophomore year in the Virginia Tech Corps of Cadets, an early sign of leadership recognition.

== World War II service ==
Enisgn Tillar volunteered for flight training and became a naval aviator in 1943. He would become one of 14 pilots who joined Bill Dean’s famed Fighting 2 aboard the carrier USS Hornet (CV-12) in September 1944. After completing his tour with VF-2, Tillar was transferred to VF-11 and finished his combat service in the Pacific as part of that squadron.

Just before dawn on September 12, 1944, he climbed into his F6F Hellcat and took off from the USS Hornet (CV-12). Air Group 2 was bombing an island of Cebu in the Philippines. Ensign Tillar became embroiled in a dogfight among three Japanese fighters, downing one of their planes before his plane was shot down. Tillar ditched the damaged aircraft and clamored aboard his life raft. He found himself about 600 yards from the small island of Apit, which was about 4 miles west of Leyte. Friendly Filipinos in outriggers retrieved him from the water. Once on shore, out of the crowd of 200 emerged a young man, Sosa, who offered to interpret. The people brought Tillar’s gear ashore and stored it in an American-built water tank. Once settled, Sosa surprised Tillar by showing him his Philippine Army papers. He had been captured by the Japanese and been imprisoned on Luzon, escaping 18 months earlier. Apit had become his hiding place.

The local chief and his wife were most hospitable, offering a meal of fish, rice, and a dozen raw eggs. About 3 pm, aircraft engines were heard overhead. Tillar signaled with his mirror but the planes did not acknowledge him. A short time later, F6Fs flew over low and slow. At the same time, an outrigger came ashore carrying a lieutenant in the Filipino guerillas. He told Tillar that he welcomed the presence of the American carriers in the area and asked for supplies. Tillar asked the officer about the number of Japanese soldiers on the large neighboring islands. He reported 15,000 on Cebu and none on Leyte. Almost immediately after securing this information, a seaplane touched down. Tillar rafted out to the rescue seaplane and was picked up by pilot Mike Spinelli.

They returned to the cruiser USS Wichita (CA-45), where Tillar was interviewed by Admiral Turner Joy. The Admiral was very interested in the information, which suggested surprisingly little Japanese troop strength in the Central Philippines.

Admiral Turner Joy sent the information to Admiral William Halsey Jr. By the next day, September 13, Admiral Halsey recommended that the proposed invasion of Yap and Mindanao be canceled in favor of a direct strike on Leyte, which was much closer to Manila and Tokyo. With General MacArthur ’s concurrence, Halsey’s bold new plan went up the chain to General Marshall, President Franklin D. Roosevelt, and other top Allied planners. Two months earlier than originally planned, American soldiers waded ashore onto Leyte.

During his service, Tillar was awarded the Distinguished Flying Cross and five Air Medals.

== After the War ==
Upon his release from the service, he re-enrolled in Virginia Polytechnic Institute to complete his degree. He enrolled in the industrial engineering and organization research. He became a member of the German Club in the fall of 1946 and participated actively in its reactivation program on campus. He graduated in June 1948 and returned to Emporia to take over the family business started by his great-grandfather.

== Marriage and family ==
Thomas married his longtime sweetheart from Willian and Mary, Ruth Weimer, in June 1946. He and Ruth W. Tillar had two children, Thomas Cato Tillar Jr., and Elizabeth Tillar.

== Death ==
He was laid to rest in Emporia, Virginia on December 9, 2003.
