= NCIS: New Orleans season 3 =

NCIS: New Orleans
- Season 3
- Season 3 U.S. DVD cover
- Showrunners: Brad Kern; Jeffrey Lieber
- Starring: Scott Bakula; Lucas Black; Vanessa Ferlito; Rob Kerkovich; Daryl "Chill" Mitchell; Shalita Grant; C. C. H. Pounder
- No. of episodes: 24

Release
- Original network: CBS
- Original release: September 20, 2016 – May 16, 2017

Season chronology
- ← Previous; Season 2 Next → Season 4

The third season of NCIS: New Orleans, an American police procedural drama television series, originally aired on CBS from September 20, 2016, through May 16, 2017. The season was produced by CBS Television Studios. NCIS: New Orleans showrunner Gary Glasberg died during production of the season.

== Cast and characters ==
=== Main ===
- Scott Bakula as Dwayne Cassius Pride, NCIS Supervisory Special Agent (SSA) and Team Leader
- Lucas Black as Christopher LaSalle, NCIS Senior Field Agent, second in command
- Vanessa Ferlito as Tammy Gregorio, NCIS Special Agent and former FBI Agent
- Rob Kerkovich as Sebastian Lund, NCIS Special Agent and Forensic Specialist
- Daryl "Chill" Mitchell as Patton Plame, NCIS Computer Specialist
- Shalita Grant as Sonja Percy, NCIS Junior Field Agent
- CCH Pounder as Loretta Wade, Jefferson Parish Medical Examiner for NCIS

=== Recurring ===
- Steven Weber as Douglas Hamilton, Mayor of New Orleans (R)
- Christopher Meyer as Danny Malloy, Loretta's eldest foster son (C.J.'s brother)
- Dani Dare as C.J. Malloy, Loretta's younger foster son (Danny's brother)
- Derek Webster as FBI Executive Assistant Director Raymond Isler
- Maury Sterling as John Stone, Mayor Hamilton's chief of security
- Julian Acosta as Javier Garcia
- Chelsea Field as Rita Devereaux, New Orleans District Attorney and Reserve Commander in the U.S. Navy's JAG and Dwayne's girlfriend
- Cassidy Freeman as Eva Azarova
- Amanda Warren as Zahra Taylor Mayor of New Orleans (D)

=== Guests ===
- Tom Arnold as Elvis Bertrand
- Mario Lopez as Officer Hernandez
- Wendie Malick as Sylvia Lund, Sebastian Lund's mother
- Christine Woods as Bonnie Madigan, SAT Com Specialist
- Jim Beaver as Jackson Hauser, Rig Manager
- Mark Harmon as Leroy Jethro Gibbs, NCIS Senior Special Agent (SSA) assigned to Washington's Navy Yard (uncredited)
- Sean Murray as Timothy McGee, NCIS Special Agent in Washington D.C., second in command
- Wilmer Valderrama as Nicholas Torres, NCIS Special Agent in D.C.
- Ed Quinn as Ethan McKinley
- Carlos Gomez as Dan Sanchez, NCIS Deputy Director
- Jeremy Ratchford as Richard Marino
- PJ Morton as himself
- Maren Morris as herself
- Toni Trucks as CGIS Agent Joan Swanson
- Amanda Clayton as Eliza West
- Matt Servitto as Carl Estes, NOPD captain

== Episodes ==
| No. overall | No. in season | Title | Directed by | Written by | Original release date | Prod. code | U.S. viewers (millions) |
|---|---|---|---|---|---|---|---|
| 48 | 1 | "Aftershocks" | James Hayman | Brad Kern | September 20, 2016 | NO301 | 11.12 |
While a sniper wreaks havoc across New Orleans, the team must also deal with Brody's unexpected departure and FBI Special Agent Gregorio's arrival to investigate the team.
| 49 | 2 | "Suspicious Minds" | Michael Zinberg | Christopher Silber | September 27, 2016 | NO302 | 10.76 |
The team investigates a homicide case that puts the blame of Pride's Navy Intelligence friend Elvis in the middle. Meanwhile, the FBI continues to internally investigate Pride's team following Brody's departure and Russo's death. The FBI takes over the case, despite a victim being a Navy officer, but Pride's team refuse to budge and find key evidence, forcing the FBI to collaborate. Gregorio is ordered to work with NCIS to bring down the cartel.
| 50 | 3 | "Man on Fire" | Rob Morrow | Zach Strauss | October 11, 2016 | NO303 | 9.62 |
The team is put in a difficult position to help rescue a Navy petty officer being held captive in Mexico. Meanwhile, Gregorio's put in a tough spot when she begins to work with Pride's team and reports back to headquarters about his team's actions.
| 51 | 4 | "Escape Plan" | James Whitmore Jr. | David Appelbaum | October 18, 2016 | NO304 | 9.53 |
As his mother visits, Sebastian is kidnapped and forced to hack into a federal detention center to help break out a serial killer and escape with him to the border.
| 52 | 5 | "Course Correction" | Tony Wharmby | Teleplay by : Chad Gomez Creasey; Story by : Cathryn Humphris & Chad Gomez Creasey | October 25, 2016 | NO305 | 9.62 |
Pride and his team investigate a plane crash that killed three plane crew and three petty officers who were passengers, which later turns out to be murder and involves the CIA. Meanwhile, LaSalle and Percy interview candidates to replace Brody. Gregorio considers whether she should stay in New Orleans or return to D.C.
| 53 | 6 | "One Good Man" | Rob J. Greenlea | Gwendolyn M. Parker | November 15, 2016 | NO306 | 9.17 |
When a SEAL-in-training is found dead after he's reported UA, the team discovers a dark secret he was hiding about his past—and a conspiracy that goes up to Mayor Hamilton. Meanwhile, LaSalle tries to evade an old flame, who has a big surprise for him. Elsewhere, Dr. Wade tries to get Pride to convince Danny to go to college rather than join the Navy.
| 54 | 7 | "Outlaws" | Mary Lou Belli | Greta Heinemann | November 22, 2016 | NO307 | 8.50 |
The team investigates the murder of a biker who was a sailor from Mississippi and later find that it might be the start of an old rivalry between two biker gangs. Percy goes undercover to find her old informant who's working for one of the gangs. Gregorio encourages LaSalle to talk to Pride about his newfound fatherhood.
| 55 | 8 | "Music to My Ears" | Michael Zinberg | Kate Sargeant Curtis | December 6, 2016 | NO308 | 9.36 |
A petty officer and member of the prestigious Navy band is found murdered, and her nephew is the only witness to the crime. Pride must try and get the boy to trust him and open up while trying to find out why she was killed. Meanwhile, Percy finds out about LaSalle's child and says he needs to get his life better organized. Elsewhere, Gregorio is conflicted between returning to Washington, D.C., and leaving the FBI to stay in New Orleans.
| 56 | 9 | "Overdrive" | Gordon Lonsdale | Ron McGee | December 13, 2016 | NO309 | 10.01 |
The team investigates a Marine and race car enthusiast who was killed in an accident, but Pride suspects foul play. Meanwhile, LaSalle receives news that Tucker isn't his son and his real father is coming for him. Despite the lie, LaSalle decides to help Melody get safely away from him. Also, Gregorio is helping Assistant U.S. Attorney Hannah Lee build a case against Garcia.
| 57 | 10 | "Follow the Money" | Stacey K. Black | Christopher Silber | January 3, 2017 | NO310 | 9.62 |
Pride and his team investigate a family friend's fiancée who is also a leader in a major drug smuggling cartel. Gregorio's conflict of interest continues as she disobeys orders from her FBI director to help NCIS bring down the cartel.
| 58 | 11 | "Let It Ride" | Nina Lopez-Corrado | Brad Kern & Taylor Streitz | January 17, 2017 | NO311 | 9.33 |
Pride takes matters into his own hands without the FBI’s involvement to catch Garcia. The team volunteers to help knowing the consequences of their involvement. Pride suggests that Sebastian go undercover to take down Garcia.
| 59 | 12 | "Hell on the High Water" | Michael Zinberg | Zach Strauss | January 24, 2017 | NO312 | 9.18 |
Pride's team works around the clock to save him from a major explosion on an oil rig, as he tries to capture suspected murderers who work on the rig. Gregorio begins her first day as an NCIS agent. Meanwhile, Sebastian starts his training to be a field agent.
| 60 | 13 | "Return of the King" | James Hayman | David Appelbaum | February 7, 2017 | NO313 | 9.01 |
The team searches for an expert computer hacker associated with "The Collective", a hacktivist organization founded by Elvis after four people are killed and incriminating videos involving prominent city officials are released.
| 61 | 14 | "Pandora's Box, Part II" | LeVar Burton | Christopher Silber | February 14, 2017 | NO316 | 10.32 |
To recover DHS's "terror playbook" – dozens of simulated, successful attacks and responses – Torres follows Venezuelan operative Ferdinand Pisco, who is killed. Pisco's phone reveals four more buyers. LeSalle and Percy find Monica Grange, also stabbed. McGee saves Sebastian struggling with another buyer. Undercover as Grange, Gregorio meets the seller, Eva Azarova, while Maren Morris performs. LeSalle and Percy capture a North Korean operative. The last buyer remains unknown. Sebastian misidentifies the assassin; Gregorio fights Azarova, who denies murdering buyers. While kidnapping Torres, Russian agent Victor's gunmen steal the playbook, which Eva voice-locked. Questioned, Eva tells Pride she stole the playbook as bait for revenge against "my mentor" Victor, who trained her during childhood "to do terrible things...I would have justice." McGee enlists the NSA "to consolidate footage" and track Victor's SUV, discovering where Torres is held; a thirty-story building. Pride meets Victor to trade Torres for Eva, who kills Victor. Eva calls Victor's gunmen to forestall them killing Torres, while Sebastian and McGee pinpoint Torres on the seventeenth floor. Torres escapes his binding, killing one gunman, before LaSalle and Percy saves him from the second. Eva faces federal prison, while Pride updates Gibbs. Note : This episode concludes a crossover event that begins on NCIS season 14 episode 15.
| 62 | 15 | "End of the Line" | Edward Ornelas | Chad Gomez Creasey | February 21, 2017 | NO314 | 9.58 |
The team investigates the grisly murder of a petty officer. Wade realizes it might be the same killer she testified against and helped send to prison 20 years ago, who was recently released and might want revenge. Later on, the killer is captured but claims to be innocent. Pride looks into the last murder and suspects that the "killer" had been framed both times.
| 63 | 16 | "The Last Stand" | Sharat Raju | Greta Heinemann | March 7, 2017 | NO315 | 9.06 |
icon
| 64 | 17 | "Swift, Silent, Deadly" | Randy Zisk | Ron McGee | March 14, 2017 | NO317 | 10.43 |
Pride's team goes on a manhunt to capture a highly skilled Marine with no criminal history after he assaults six civilians in a bar. However, the case becomes more complicated when it turns out the Marine's wife has been abducted by a woman's trafficking ring.
| 65 | 18 | "Slay the Dragon" | Mary Lou Belli | Kate Sargeant Curtis | March 14, 2017 | NO318 | 10.43 |
Gregorio's ex-husband, who disappeared after embezzling more than $80 million from the Hurricane Katrina relief fund, comes to New Orleans after Pride's team found a connection with him and a murder investigation.
| 66 | 19 | "Quid Pro Quo" | Alex Zakrzewski | Zach Strauss | March 28, 2017 | NO319 | 9.17 |
While investigating a deadly accident at a naval base, the team discovers a unit of Seabees was poisoned with a contagious super virus leaving the rest of the base and the entire city of New Orleans at risk for a catastrophic outbreak. During the autopsy, Wade is infected with the virus and given hours to live if an antidote can't be found.
| 67 | 20 | "NOLA Confidential" | Geary McLeod | David Appelbaum & Taylor Streitz | April 4, 2017 | NO320 | 8.88 |
LaSalle's old partner at the New Orleans Police Department's Vice Squad (Jeremy Ratchford) comes under investigation when drugs from NOPD evidence lock-up are discovered on the streets and smuggled onto a Navy ship. Meanwhile, Pride and Rita discuss their relationship as she delves into Hamilton's connection to the impoverished Clearwater neighborhood.
| 68 | 21 | "Krewe" | Tony Wharmby | Judith McCreary | April 18, 2017 | NO321 | 10.16 |
Pride's team puts their careers at risk when Pride puts a wiretap on Mayor Hamilton's cell phone to help bring him down while the team investigates the mysterious theft of Navy weapons.
| 69 | 22 | "Knockout" | Gordon Lonsdale | Chad Gomez Creasey & Greta Heinemann | May 2, 2017 | NO322 | 8.69 |
Following the murder of a Navy chaplain, the team (down Percy) looks for a link between the murder and Mayor Hamilton and his plans for Clearwater.
| 70 | 23 | "Down the Rabbit Hole" | Edward Ornelas | Brad Kern | May 9, 2017 | NO323 | 9.02 |
After a tail on one of Hamilton's men goes horribly awry, the team faces the political backlash demanding they stop their investigation or else.
| 71 | 24 | "Poetic Justice" | James Hayman | Teleplay by : Christopher Silber; Story by : Christopher Silber & Katherine Beattie | May 16, 2017 | NO324 | 9.22 |
Pride is forced to fake his death and go rogue in order to capture Hamilton and confront him about his crimes. Meanwhile, the rest of the team enlist the FBI assistant director to help track down Pride.

== Production ==
=== Development ===
NCIS: New Orleans was renewed for a third season on March 25, 2016. The third season was the last season produced by the NCIS: New Orleans creator and showrunner Gary Glasberg before he died on September 28, 2016. This season featured a crossover with NCIS and NCIS: New Orleans with a two-part crossover episode. Scott Bakula, and Lucas Black appeared as Dwayne Pride, and Christopher LaSalle, in the fifteenth episode of the fourteenth season of NCIS episode titled "Pandora's Box (Part I)". In the second part Mark Harmon, Sean Murray, and Wilmer Valderrama appeared as Leroy Jethro Gibbs, Timothy McGee, and Nicholas Torres in this season episode titled "Pandora's Box, Part II" which aired on February 14, 2017. NCIS: New Orleans was renewed for a fourth season on March 23, 2017.

=== Casting ===
Zoe McLellan, who played Special Agent Meredith Brody, will not be returning for their season. and former CSI:NY star Vanessa Ferlito joins the cast as Special Agent Tammy Gregorio.

== Broadcast ==
Season three of NCIS: New Orleans premiered on September 20, 2016.

== Reception ==
=== Ratings ===
Viewership and ratings per episode of NCIS: New Orleans season 3
| No. | Title | Air date | Rating/share (18–49) | Viewers (millions) | DVR (18–49) | DVR viewers (millions) | Total (18–49) | Total viewers (millions) |
|---|---|---|---|---|---|---|---|---|
| 1 | "Aftershocks" | September 20, 2016 | 1.4/5 | 11.12 | —N/a | 4.00 | —N/a | 15.12 |
| 2 | "Suspicious Minds" | September 27, 2016 | 1.5/6 | 10.76 | —N/a | 3.51 | —N/a | 14.27 |
| 3 | "Man on Fire" | October 11, 2016 | 1.2/5 | 9.62 | 0.8 | 3.81 | 2.0 | 13.43 |
| 4 | "Escape Plan" | October 18, 2016 | 1.2/5 | 9.53 | 0.8 | 3.66 | 2.0 | 13.19 |
| 5 | "Course Correction" | October 25, 2016 | 1.3/5 | 9.62 | 0.7 | 3.53 | 2.0 | 13.14 |
| 6 | "One Good Man" | November 15, 2016 | 1.2/4 | 9.17 | 0.7 | 3.57 | 1.9 | 12.74 |
| 7 | "Outlaws" | November 22, 2016 | 1.2/4 | 8.50 | 0.8 | 4.22 | 2.0 | 12.73 |
| 8 | "Music to My Ears" | December 6, 2016 | 1.2/4 | 9.36 | 0.7 | 4.02 | 1.9 | 13.38 |
| 9 | "Overdrive" | December 13, 2016 | 1.2/4 | 10.01 | 0.7 | 3.72 | 1.9 | 13.76 |
| 10 | "Follow the Money" | January 3, 2017 | 1.2/4 | 9.62 | 0.8 | 4.07 | 2.0 | 13.69 |
| 11 | "Let It Ride" | January 17, 2017 | 1.2/5 | 9.33 | 0.7 | 4.12 | 1.9 | 13.45 |
| 12 | "Hell on the High Water" | January 24, 2017 | 1.1/4 | 9.18 | 0.7 | 3.87 | 1.8 | 13.05 |
| 13 | "Return of the King" | February 7, 2017 | 1.0/4 | 9.01 | 0.8 | 4.18 | 1.8 | 13.19 |
| 14 | "Pandora's Box, Part II" | February 14, 2017 | 1.2/5 | 10.32 | 0.9 | 4.71 | 2.1 | 15.03 |
| 15 | "End of the Line" | February 21, 2017 | 1.1/4 | 9.58 | 0.7 | 3.93 | 1.8 | 13.51 |
| 16 | "The Last Stand" | March 7, 2017 | 1.1/4 | 9.06 | 0.7 | 3.86 | 1.8 | 12.93 |
| 17 | "Swift, Silent, Deadly" | March 14, 2017 | 1.2/4 | 10.43 | 0.6 | 3.29 | 1.8 | 13.72 |
| 18 | "Slay the Dragon" | March 14, 2017 | 1.2/4 | 10.43 | 0.6 | 3.29 | 1.8 | 13.72 |
| 19 | "Quid Pro Quo" | March 28, 2017 | 1.1/4 | 9.17 | 0.7 | 3.63 | 1.8 | 12.80 |
| 20 | "NOLA Confidential" | April 4, 2017 | 1.0/4 | 8.88 | 0.7 | 3.79 | 1.7 | 12.64 |
| 21 | "Krewe" | April 18, 2017 | 1.1/4 | 10.16 | 0.7 | 3.88 | 1.8 | 14.04 |
| 22 | "Knockout" | May 2, 2017 | 1.0/4 | 8.69 | 0.8 | 3.88 | 1.8 | 12.57 |
| 23 | "Down the Rabbit Hole" | May 9, 2017 | 1.0/4 | 9.02 | 0.7 | 3.63 | 1.7 | 12.65 |
| 24 | "Poetic Justice" | May 16, 2017 | 1.1/4 | 9.22 | 0.7 | 3.70 | 1.8 | 12.81 |
