= NCIS: New Orleans season 2 =

NCIS: New Orleans
- Season 2
- Season 2 U.S. DVD cover
- Showrunners: Gary Glasberg; Jeffrey Lieber
- Starring: Scott Bakula; Lucas Black; Zoe McLellan; Rob Kerkovich; C. C. H. Pounder; Daryl "Chill" Mitchell; Shalita Grant
- No. of episodes: 24

Release
- Original network: CBS
- Original release: September 22, 2015 – May 17, 2016

Season chronology
- ← Previous; Season 1 Next → Season 3

The second season of NCIS: New Orleans, an American police procedural drama television series, originally aired on CBS from September 22, 2015, through May 17, 2016. The season was produced by CBS Television Studios, with Gary Glasberg as showrunner and executive producer.

== Plot ==
The second season of the NCIS: New Orleans once again follows the work of Special Agent Dwayne Pride, Chris LaSalle, Meredith Brody, and new team member Sonja Percy. Tasked with solving crimes involving the U.S. Navy and Marine Corps in the Crescent City, the team investigate the ambush of a Navy convoy ("Sic Semper Tyrannis"), a suspected war crime ("Shadow Unit"), the black-market sale of a military drone ("I Do"), and a murder at New Orleans' annual Red Dress run ("Insane in the Membrane"). Pride also works alongside an Australian Naval Investigator, who comes to New Orleans as part of a joint task force ("Foreign Affairs"), and Secretary Sarah Porter, as she oversees the inquiry into the crash of a new military jet ("Touched by the Sun"), while Brody's mother, Olivia, joins the team to track down an organ thief ("Broken Hearted"), and NCIS agents join their New Orleans counterparts when a family member is accused of murder ("Sister City, Part II").

== Cast and characters ==
=== Main ===
- Scott Bakula as Dwayne Cassius Pride, NCIS Supervisory Special Agent (SSA) assigned to the New Orleans Office
- Lucas Black as Christopher LaSalle, NCIS Senior Field Agent, (SFA), second in command
- Zoe McLellan as Meredith Brody, NCIS Special Agent for the New Orleans Office
- Rob Kerkovich as Sebastian Lund, Jefferson Parish Forensic Specialist for NCIS
- Daryl "Chill" Mitchell as Patton Plame, Computer Specialist for NCIS
- Shalita Grant as Sonja Percy, NCIS Special Agent and Former ATF field Agent
- CCH Pounder as Dr. Loretta Wade, Jefferson Parish Medical Examiner for NCIS

=== Recurring ===
- Christopher Meyer as Danny Malloy, Loretta's eldest foster son (C.J.'s brother)
- Shanley Caswell as Laurel Pride, Dwayne Pride's daughter
- Steven Weber as Douglas Hamilton, New Orleans city councilman of District C and later Mayor of New Orleans (R)

=== Guests ===
- Leslie Hope as Sarah Porter, Secretary of the Navy
- Kate Beahan as Naomi Parsons, Australian Defence Force Investigative Service agent and love interest of Dwayne Pride
- Benjamin Papac as Max "PinZ0" Pinzon
- Annie Potts as Olivia Brody
- Dani Dare as C.J. Malloy, Loretta's youngest foster son (Danny's brother)
- JC Gonzalez as Jake
- Emily Marie Palmer as Beth
- Rick Peters as Thomas Freeman
- Erica Dasher as Sofia Freeman
- Daniel Francois as Alonzo Brown
- Mark Harmon as Leroy Jethro Gibbs, NCIS Senior Special Agent (SSA) assigned to Washington's Navy Yard
- Pauley Perrette as Abigail Sciuto, Forensic Specialist attached to NCIS in D.C.
- Brian Dietzen as Jimmy Palmer, Assistant Medical Examiner for NCIS in D.C.
- Emily Wickersham as Eleanor Bishop, NCIS Special Agent in D.C.
- David McCallum as Dr. Donald Mallard, Chief Medical Examiner for NCIS in D.C.
- Tyler Ritter as Luca Sciuto, Abby's brother
- Cassidy Freeman as Eva Azarova
- Tina Benko as Paulina Kurteva, a Russian attaché and former GRU Agent who has history with Agent Pride
- Brian McNamara as Randy Wilson
- Jude Ciccolella as David Peterson, former Army Colonel (formerly Sec Nav in "original" NCIS)
- Ivan Sergei as John Russo
- Toni Trucks as CGIS Agent Joan Swanson

== Episodes ==
No. overall	No. in season	Title	Directed by	Written by	Original release date	Prod. code	U.S. viewers (millions)
24	1	"Sic Semper Tyrannis"	James Whitmore Jr.	Jeffrey Lieber	September 22, 2015	NO201	12.62
Following an ambush on a Navy convoy, the team discovers that a sophisticated GPS-guided missile has gone missing. They track the theft to a massive meeting of anti-government militia groups, with Pride going undercover to learn what they intend to do with the missile. Meanwhile, Percy adjusts to NCIS, having become an NCIS Special Agent while being pranked by Brody and LaSalle. Elsewhere, Pride's divorce is finalized.
25	2	"Shadow Unit"	James Hayman	Christopher Silber	September 29, 2015	NO202	12.86
The team investigate a murder of a blogger who obtained a top secret government file. It is later revealed that a trained Navy SEAL might be behind the crime and also a possible war crime.
26	3	"Touched by the Sun"	Edward Ornelas	Laurie Arent	October 6, 2015	NO203	14.18
The team investigates the plane crash of a Navy pilot. Meanwhile, Wade deals with some family issues.
27	4	"I Do"	Tony Wharmby	Sam Humphrey	October 13, 2015	NO204	12.47
The team investigates the murder of a Navy drone pilot. Later on, it's revealed that the pilot was using a black market drone to obtain military files which could be linked to the murder. Meanwhile, Pride confronts LaSalle about his self-destructive behavior after Savannah's murder.
28	5	"Foreign Affairs"	Laura Belsey	Sanford Golden & Karen Wyscarver	October 20, 2015	NO205	12.99
A murder results in help from Australian Defence Force Investigative Service Investigator Naomi Parsons, but the team is dubious about her. Meanwhile, Pride and his daughter bond.
29	6	"Insane in the Membrane"	Leslie Libman	David Appelbaum	October 27, 2015	NO206	13.06
The team investigates the murder of a petty officer while they participate in a Red Dress Run for charity. It leads them to an epidemic of a new drug called Flakka, which then leads them to one politician as the culprit.
30	7	"Broken Hearted"	Elodie Keene	Zach Strauss & Greta Heinemann	November 3, 2015	NO207	14.15
The team investigates the murder of two Navy paramedics and searches for a missing organ for a recipient. Meanwhile, Brody's mother Olivia comes to visit and joins the team to help with the case.
31	8	"Confluence"	Edward Ornelas	Teleplay by : Jeffrey Lieber; Story by : Jeffrey Lieber & Katherine Beattie	November 10, 2015	NO208	12.39
Pride and Percy are caught in a violent crossfire while escorting a Texas prisoner as a key witness to a murder trial. The team later discover that old enemy Zed Hastings (from "Sic Semper Tyranis") has set a trap in order to get Pride.
32	9	"Darkest Hour"	Michael Zinberg	Laurie Arent	November 17, 2015	NO209	13.01
The power in New Orleans goes out while the team investigates the murder of a petty officer who was engaged to a friend of Laurel Pride.
33	10	"Billy and the Kid"	Mary Lou Belli	Sam Humphrey	November 24, 2015	NO210	11.85
Pride and LaSalle uncover lost evidence of a ten-year-old murder investigation they were working on when they first met right before Hurricane Katrina.
34	11	"Blue Christmas"	Tony Wharmby	Zach Strauss	December 15, 2015	NO211	12.09
At Christmas, the team investigates the death of a Navy officer's wife during a home-invasion burglary. Wade's loyalties to job and family come into conflict when her adopted son Danny is implicated in the crime and arrested.
35	12	"Sister City, Part II"	James Hayman	Christopher Silber	January 5, 2016	NO212	17.25
After events in "Sister City (Part I)," armed Russians search but don't find Counselor Pavlenko's body in Chief ME Dr. Donald Mallard's van; a ruse. D.C. NCIS Special Agent Eleanor Bishop travels to New Orleans with Pavlenko's body so Dr. Wade can investigate further. Washington NCIS Senior Special Agent Leroy Jethro Gibbs reads-in Pride on Blye Industries-DoD project "Manta Ray," a next-gen stealth warship. Russian GRU sleeper agent Eva Azarova, who is involved with Forensic Specialist Abigail Sciuto's brother Luca, is suspected of poisoning Pavlenko and five people on a Blye jet. At a research station, they finally find the missing high-end military technology developer Jenner Blye, right before he too is poisoned. Blye CFO Dalton Greenbrick and security head Blake Huxley obstruct Pride's questions, but Blye survives and cooperates; they learn the ship may have been sold to Russia through a Norwegian shell company. Sebastion finds a bug in Pavlenko's tooth, which he and Patton use to find Russian attaché Paulina Kurteva, and clone her phone in return. They track Paulina to apprehend to Eva, only to be shot at by Huxley. Pride must untangle a web of lies and espionage to find the truth. Note : This episode concludes a crossover event that begins on NCIS season 13, episode 12.
36	13	"Undocumented"	Frederick E.O. Toye	David Appelbaum	January 19, 2016	NO213	13.30
The team investigate a murder made to look like a suicide of a Navy petty officer. Meanwhile, the team set up an online dating profile for Pride.
37	14	"Father's Day"	Dennis Smith	Sam Humphrey	February 9, 2016	NO215	12.57
In the midst of Mardi Gras, Pride and Mayor Hamilton are abducted from their parties. While the team races to locate them, the two find themselves with the husband whose wife's supposed suicide was investigated by Pride, and Hamilton was suspected of killing her.
38	15	"No Man's Land"	James Whitmore Jr.	Cathryn Humphris	February 16, 2016	NO214	13.41
The team search for a man who saved a soldier's life on a train as they believe he's a soldier himself and served in Afghanistan.
39	16	"Second Chances"	Tessa Blake	Zach Strauss	February 23, 2016	NO216	12.60
Following the theft of TNT from a Navy base, the team's investigation leads them to Sonya and a drug ring using the TNT to process cocaine.
40	17	"Radio Silence"	Michael Zinberg	Laurie Arent & Greta Heinemann	March 1, 2016	NO217	11.72
After a Navy captain's murder is broadcast over the radio, the team's investigation leads them to protect the radio host and look into her charity. Meanwhile, Pride's daughter makes a surprising decision about her future.
41	18	"If It Bleeds, It Leads"	Bethany Rooney	David Appelbaum	March 15, 2016	NO218	11.97
The team investigate a deadly traffic accident that provides a new lead to the murder of Brody's sister.
42	19	"Means to an End"	Alrick Riley	Christopher Silber	March 22, 2016	NO219	13.38
The NCIS team discover a surveillance van tracking every move of Pride while he investigates an attack on his daughter.
43	20	"Second Line"	Tony Wharmby	Nancylee Myatt	April 5, 2016	NO220	12.28
The team investigates a murder of a Navy lieutenant while at a funeral for a fellow Navy reservist, with Pride thinking these deaths might be connected.
44	21	"Collateral Damage"	James Whitmore Jr.	Cathryn Humphris	April 19, 2016	NO221	12.22
The jobs of Pride and his team are in jeopardy when they investigate the murder of a naval supply officer with whom an army general was supposedly having an affair.
45	22	"Help Wanted"	Terrence O'Hara	Sam Humphrey	May 3, 2016	NO222	12.56
The NCIS team investigate a suspicious explosion at a popular restaurant in New Orleans that targeted a Navy culinary specialist. Meanwhile, Brody is questioned by the FBI about the General Matthews case and meets a DHS official.
46	23	"The Third Man"	Bethany Rooney	David Appelbaum & Zach Strauss	May 10, 2016	NO223	13.24
The NCIS team works with Homeland Security on a case involving the murder of a Navy master diver, which they later link to a plot of a terrorist attack in New Orleans.
47	24	"Sleeping with the Enemy"	James Hayman	Christopher Silber	May 17, 2016	NO224	13.30
While tracking down stolen explosives, Brody suspects that the Homeland Security agent assisting them is the ringleader of the plot. Note : This is the last episode with Zoe McLellan as a series regular.

== Production ==
=== Development ===
NCIS: New Orleans was renewed for a second season on January 12, 2015. This season featured a crossover with NCIS and NCIS: New Orleans with a two-part crossover episode. Scott Bakula, Lucas Black, Zoe McLellan, and Shalita Grant appeared as Dwayne Pride, Christopher LaSalle, Meredith "Merri" Brody, and Sonja Percy in the twelfth episode of the thirteen season of NCIS episode titled "Sister City (Part I)". The second part Mark Harmon, Pauley Perrette, Brian Dietzen, Emily Wickersham, and David McCallum appeared as Leroy Jethro Gibbs, Abby Sciuto, Jimmy Palmer, Ellie Bishop, and Dr. Donald Mallard in the twelfth episode of this season episode titled "Sister City, Part II" which aired on January 5, 2016. Tyler Ritter also guest stars as Luca Sciuto Abby's brother. NCIS: New Orleans was renewed for a third season on March 25, 2016.

=== Casting ===
On June 19, 2015, Daryl Mitchell and Shalita Grant, who had been recurring cast, were promoted to series regulars.

== Broadcast ==
Season two of NCIS: New Orleans, which premiered on September 22, 2015.

== Reception ==
=== Ratings ===
Viewership and ratings per episode of NCIS: New Orleans season 2
No.	Title	Air date	Rating/share (18–49)	Viewers (millions)	DVR (18–49)	DVR viewers (millions)	Total (18–49)	Total viewers (millions)
1	"Sic Semper Tyrannis"	September 22, 2015	1.7/5	12.62	0.9	3.82	2.6	16.44
2	"Shadow Unit"	September 29, 2015	1.7/5	12.86	—N/a	2.92	—N/a	15.78
3	"Touched by the Sun"	October 6, 2015	1.7/5	14.18	—N/a	2.98	—N/a	17.16
4	"I Do"	October 13, 2015	1.5/4	12.47	—N/a	3.16	—N/a	15.63
5	"Foreign Affairs"	October 20, 2015	1.6/5	12.99	—N/a	3.02	—N/a	16.01
6	"Insane in the Membrane"	October 27, 2015	1.6/5	13.06	—N/a	2.99	—N/a	16.04
7	"Broken Hearted"	November 3, 2015	1.9/6	14.15	—N/a	2.65	—N/a	16.80
8	"Confluence"	November 10, 2015	1.7/5	12.39	—N/a	3.03	—N/a	15.42
9	"Darkest Hour"	November 17, 2015	1.7/5	13.01	—N/a	2.87	—N/a	15.88
10	"Billy and the Kid"	November 24, 2015	1.6/5	11.85	0.8	3.30	2.4	15.16
11	"Blue Christmas"	December 15, 2015	1.7/5	12.09	0.8	3.35	2.5	15.44
12	"Sister City, Part II"	January 5, 2016	2.5/8	17.25	0.8	3.86	3.3	21.11
13	"Undocumented"	January 19, 2016	1.8/6	13.30	0.8	3.20	2.6	16.52
14	"Father's Day"	February 9, 2016	1.8/6	12.57	0.8	3.23	2.6	15.82
15	"No Man's Land"	February 16, 2016	2.0/7	13.41	0.7	3.08	2.7	16.50
16	"Second Chances"	February 23, 2016	1.8/6	12.60	0.8	3.17	2.6	15.72
17	"Radio Silence"	March 1, 2016	1.6/5	11.72	0.7	3.09	2.3	14.81
18	"If It Bleeds, It Leads"	March 15, 2016	1.6/6	11.97	0.7	3.14	2.3	15.07
19	"Means to an End"	March 22, 2016	1.8/6	13.38	0.8	3.24	2.6	16.62
20	"Second Line"	April 5, 2016	1.7/5	12.28	0.7	3.41	2.4	15.68
21	"Collateral Damage"	April 19, 2016	1.6/5	12.22	0.7	3.26	2.3	15.48
22	"Help Wanted"	May 3, 2016	1.8/6	12.56	—N/a	3.03	—N/a	15.59
23	"The Third Man"	May 10, 2016	1.7/6	13.24	0.7	3.33	2.4	16.58
24	"Sleeping with the Enemy"	May 17, 2016	1.8/6	13.30	0.7	3.09	2.5	16.39
