= NCIS: New Orleans season 6 =

Season of television series

NCIS: New Orleans
- Season 6
- Season 6 U.S. DVD cover
- Showrunners: Jan Nash; Christopher Silber
- Starring: Scott Bakula; Lucas Black; Vanessa Ferlito; Necar Zadegan; Rob Kerkovich; Daryl Mitchell; CCH Pounder; Charles Michael Davis
- No. of episodes: 20

Release
- Original network: CBS
- Original release: September 24, 2019 – April 19, 2020

Season chronology
- ← Previous; Season 5 Next → Season 7

The sixth season of NCIS: New Orleans an American police procedural drama television series, originally aired on CBS from September 24, 2019, through April 19, 2020. The season was produced by CBS Television Studios, with Christopher Silber and Jan Nash as showrunner and executive producer.

== Cast and characters ==
=== Main ===
- Scott Bakula as Dwayne Cassius Pride, NCIS Southeast Field Office Special Agent in Charge (SAC), later Supervisory Special Agent (SSA) and Team Leader
- Lucas Black as Christopher LaSalle, (Note: Black is credited as a regular through sixth episode of the season after which he departs the series.) NCIS Senior Field Agent (SFA)
- Vanessa Ferlito as Tammy Gregorio, NCIS Special Agent
- Necar Zadegan as Hannah Khoury, NCIS Senior Agent, Team Leader demoted to second in command
- Rob Kerkovich as Sebastian Lund, NCIS Special Agent (SA) and Forensics Specialist
- Daryl "Chill" Mitchell as Patton Plame, NCIS Computer Specialist
- CCH Pounder as Loretta Wade, Jefferson Parish Medical Examiner
- Charles Michael Davis as Quentin Carter, (Note: Davis is credited as a regular beginning in "The Man in the Red Suit".) NCIS Special Agent

=== Recurring ===
- Chelsea Field as Rita Devereaux, Dwayne's girlfriend
- Shanley Caswell as Laurel Pride, Dwayne's daughter by his ex-wife, Linda Pride
- Derek Webster as Raymond Isler, FBI Senior Special Agent
- Jason Alan Carvell as Jimmy Boyd, Dwayne's younger, previously unknown half-brother
- Richard Thomas as NCIS Deputy Director Ezra Van Cleef
- Hal Ozsan as Ryan Porter
- Lenny Platt as Detective David Cabrera
- Amanda Warren as Mayor Zahra Taylor
- Keith David as Gene Holloway
- Joanna Cassidy as Mena Cantrell
- Venus Ariel as Naomi Porter
- Cory Hart as D.I.A. Agent Winchester

=== Guest ===
- Eddie Cahill as Eddie Barrett
- Rebecca Luker as Rose LaSalle
- Lucy Faust as Sue-Ann Hughes
- Angel Desai as Dr. Beth Tanaka
- Callie Thorne as Sasha Broussard
- Paige Turco as Linda Pride
- Cooper Jack Rubin as Tom
- Arielle Bianca as Neighbor #10

Cast notes

== Episodes ==
| No. overall | No. in season | Title | Directed by | Written by | Original release date | Prod. code | U.S. viewers (millions) |
|---|---|---|---|---|---|---|---|
| 120 | 1 | "Judgement Call" | James Hayman | Christopher Silber | September 24, 2019 | NO601 | 6.66 |
Pride is forced to suspend Hannah from duty after she breaks protocol following a joint operation with the FBI to take down a white supremacist. Meanwhile, Pride and Rita visit Pride's mother who is revealed to be suffering from Alzheimer’s disease.
| 121 | 2 | "The Terminator Conundrum" | Edward Ornelas | Jan Nash | October 1, 2019 | NO602 | 6.90 |
A Navy pilot discovers an unidentified flying object shortly before crashing. Meanwhile, Pride suffers through nightmares and insomnia from being kidnapped and drugged. LaSalle goes to Mobile, Alabama, to locate his missing brother.
| 122 | 3 | "Bad Apple" | Stacey K. Black | Ron McGee | October 8, 2019 | NO603 | 6.69 |
Pride visits New York City after he learns newly acquired DNA evidence is linked to a cold case from 20 years ago when he worked at the Jefferson Parish Sheriff's office.
| 123 | 4 | "Overlooked" | Gordon Lonsdale | Stephanie Sengupta | October 15, 2019 | NO604 | 6.57 |
A private immigration detention center is found at the center of a sex-trafficking ring. LaSalle and Sebastian search for LaSalle's missing brother in Alabama.
| 124 | 5 | "Spies & Lies" | LeVar Burton | Brooke Roberts | October 22, 2019 | NO605 | 6.64 |
A Navy lieutenant, Max Landry (Michael Ocampo), asks the New Orleans field office for help when he suspects that his girlfriend is actually a spy. Meanwhile, LaSalle faces another devastating setback when he finds his brother's body in Alabama.
| 125 | 6 | "Matthew 5:9" | Michael Zinberg | Chad Gomez Creasey | November 5, 2019 | NO606 | 6.61 |
LaSalle hopes to avenge his brother's murder by tracking an opioid drug ring in Alabama which he believes is responsible. While investigating a remote cabin, LaSalle is shot. He's flown to a hospital where he dies, leaving Pride and the team devastated. When Pride assists with the case, he meets and later arrests a man who was involved in the shooting.
| 126 | 7 | "Boom-Boom-Boom-Boom" | Mary Lou Belli | Talicia Raggs | November 12, 2019 | NO607 | 6.41 |
A movie theater is leveled in the aftermath of a natural gas explosion, which the team learns was caused by a hacker who could trigger further explosions. The team continues to mourn the loss of LaSalle.
| 127 | 8 | "The Order of the Mongoose" | Rob Greenlea | Katherine Beattie | November 19, 2019 | NO608 | 6.89 |
Sebastian summons the team to offer their assistance with a potential kidnapping case when the son of a dignitary goes missing from a local concert venue. Wade investigates when a woman is abused.
| 128 | 9 | "Convicted" | Hart Bochner | Jan Nash & Christopher Silber | November 26, 2019 | NO609 | 6.87 |
When LaSalle's accused killer, Eddie Barrett, is released after providing an alibi witness, Pride and his team continue to gather evidence and discover Barrett controls an armed cult.
| 129 | 10 | "Requital" | Michael Zinberg | Jan Nash & Christopher Silber | December 17, 2019 | NO610 | 7.05 |
Pride becomes a hostage at Barrett's plantation near Jeanerette. There is a standoff between the cultists and the NCIS/FBI with the media watching. Barrett, whose aim is chaos, had rigged the house to explode but Sebastian foils that. While everyone else is arrested Barrett escapes through a tunnel. When Pride catches him, Barrett threatens Pride's family, which provokes Pride into killing him, though he tells his team that Barrett was reaching for his weapon.
| 130 | 11 | "Bad Moon Rising" | Lionel Coleman | Ron McGee | February 16, 2020 | NO611 | 5.24 |
The team is concerned when Sebastian becomes unreachable while undercover as a new recruit for an organization specializing in coordinated terrorist attacks.
| 131 | 12 | "Waiting for Monroe" | James Whitmore Jr. | Sydney Mitchel | February 23, 2020 | NO612 | 5.59 |
The team must track down a mysterious assassin responsible for murders in Athens, Rome and London. Also, Wade's son begs her to allow him to go on a police ridealong for an article he's writing on a youth outreach program at the NOPD.
| 132 | 13 | "The Root of All Evil" | Tessa Blake | Stephanie Sengupta & Corey Moore | March 1, 2020 | NO613 | 5.56 |
The team investigates the murder of a JAG officer whose daughter had witnessed it. Pride immediately suspects that the daughter and her boyfriend might be the ones involved after he discovers that the victim had cut her out of his estate. Meanwhile, Sebastian begins his new NCIS training.
| 133 | 14 | "The Man in the Red Suit" | James Hayman | Chad Gomez Creasey & Jan Nash | March 8, 2020 | NO614 | 5.62 |
During a case, Pride announces that he's going on medical leave from the task force to figure out the memory that keeps him up at night. At the same time Pride announces Special Agent Quentin Carter as the newest member and the replacement for LaSalle to an icy reception.
| 134 | 15 | "Relentless" | Gordon Lonsdale | Cameron Dupuy | March 15, 2020 | NO615 | 6.35 |
Gregorio must protect an autistic teenage girl with a gift for research after her father is shot in their home. The rest of the team searches for a motive. Meanwhile, Pride brings his mother to his bar to get her to relive her memories.
| 135 | 16 | "Pride and Prejudice" | Hart Bochner | Brooke Roberts | March 15, 2020 | NO616 | 5.83 |
The team investigates a man who pretended to be LaSalle and the prisoner he tried to free from jail. Pride's daughter comes for a surprise visit.
| 136 | 17 | "Biased" | LeVar Burton | Talicia Raggs | March 22, 2020 | NO617 | 6.39 |
Racial tensions rise in New Orleans when a white NOPD officer shoots a black Navy officer he believed was carrying a weapon in the middle of a busy street party.
| 137 | 18 | "A Changed Woman" | Mary Lou Belli | Katherine Beattie | March 29, 2020 | NO618 | 6.50 |
When a Navy sailor is found dead, the team tracks suspicious movements of people in his life prior to his death. Also, Hannah comes to terms with her daughter's relationship with her ex's new girlfriend Veronica (Katie Rose Clark).
| 138 | 19 | "Monolith" | Diana Valentine | Chad Gomez Creasey & Sydney Mitchel | April 12, 2020 | NO619 | 5.88 |
When Sebastian is injured while unsuccessfully trying to prevent a kidnapping, NCIS races to find the missing woman and her abductors. Also, the team gets a peek into Agent Carter's personal life.
| 139 | 20 | "Predators" | Gordon Lonsdale | Stephanie Sengupta | April 19, 2020 | NO620 | 6.24 |
The team investigates the death of a Naval microbiologist whose hobby as a "myth buster" resulted in his death at the tentacle of a legendary bayou creature. Agent Khoury conducts an investigation into the previous actions of Deputy Director Van Cleef who recently demoted her for misguided allegations that she exhibited poor judgement.

== Production ==
=== Development ===
NCIS: New Orleans was renewed for a sixth season on April 22, 2019. In March 2020, CBS announced that the filming of this season has been delayed the production following the COVID-19 pandemic. On May 6, 2020, NCIS: New Orleans was renewed for the seventh season.

=== Casting ===
Lucas Black left the series during the sixth season. NCIS: New Orleans showrunners said "We are sad to see him go, but happy he will have more time to spend with his family." Black last appeared in the sixth episode "Matthew 5:9." On February 5, 2020, it was announced that Charles Michael Davis had been cast as Quentin Carter, and would appear as a series regular.

== Broadcast ==
The sixth season of NCIS: New Orleans premiered on September 24, 2019.

== Reception ==
=== Ratings ===
Viewership and ratings per episode of NCIS: New Orleans season 6
| No. | Title | Air date | Timeslot (ET) | Rating/share (18–49) | Viewers (millions) | DVR (18–49) | DVR viewers (millions) | Total (18–49) | Total viewers (millions) |
|---|---|---|---|---|---|---|---|---|---|
| 1 | "Judgement Call" | September 24, 2019 | Tuesday 10:00 p.m. | 0.7/4 | 6.66 | 0.6 | 3.94 | 1.3 | 10.60 |
| 2 | "The Terminator Conundrum" | October 1, 2019 | Tuesday 10:00 p.m. | 0.7/4 | 6.90 | 0.5 | 3.60 | 1.2 | 10.50 |
| 3 | "Bad Apple" | October 8, 2019 | Tuesday 10:00 p.m. | 0.7/4 | 6.69 | 0.5 | 3.43 | 1.2 | 10.12 |
| 4 | "Overlooked" | October 15, 2019 | Tuesday 10:00 p.m. | 0.7/4 | 6.57 | —N/a | 3.04 | —N/a | 9.61 |
| 5 | "Spies & Lies" | October 22, 2019 | Tuesday 10:00 p.m. | 0.7/4 | 6.64 | 0.4 | 3.19 | 1.1 | 9.83 |
| 6 | "Matthew 5:9" | November 5, 2019 | Tuesday 10:00 p.m. | 0.6/4 | 6.61 | 0.5 | 3.38 | 1.1 | 9.99 |
| 7 | "Boom-Boom-Boom-Boom" | November 12, 2019 | Tuesday 10:00 p.m. | 0.6/4 | 6.41 | 0.4 | 3.17 | 1.0 | 9.58 |
| 8 | "The Order of the Mongoose" | November 19, 2019 | Tuesday 10:00 p.m. | 0.7/4 | 6.89 | 0.4 | 3.23 | 1.1 | 10.12 |
| 9 | "Convicted" | November 26, 2019 | Tuesday 10:00 p.m. | 0.8/5 | 6.87 | 0.5 | 3.41 | 1.3 | 10.28 |
| 10 | "Requital" | December 17, 2019 | Tuesday 10:00 p.m. | 0.9/5 | 7.05 | 0.4 | 3.12 | 1.3 | 10.17 |
| 11 | "Bad Moon Rising" | February 16, 2020 | Sunday 10:00 p.m. | 0.5 | 5.24 | 0.5 | 3.22 | 1.0 | 8.46 |
| 12 | "Waiting for Monroe" | February 23, 2020 | Sunday 10:00 p.m. | 0.6 | 5.59 | 0.4 | 3.22 | 1.0 | 8.81 |
| 13 | "The Root of All Evil" | March 1, 2020 | Sunday 10:00 p.m. | 0.5 | 5.56 | 0.4 | 3.25 | 0.9 | 8.81 |
| 14 | "The Man in the Red Suit" | March 8, 2020 | Sunday 10:00 p.m. | 0.5 | 5.62 | 0.4 | 3.00 | 0.9 | 8.62 |
| 15 | "Relentless" | March 15, 2020 | Sunday 10:00 p.m. | 0.6 | 6.35 | 0.4 | 2.74 | 1.0 | 9.09 |
| 16 | "Pride and Prejudice" | March 15, 2020 | Sunday 10:00 p.m. | 0.6 | 5.83 | 0.4 | 3.16 | 1.0 | 8.99 |
| 17 | "Biased" | March 22, 2020 | Sunday 10:00 p.m. | 0.7 | 6.39 | 0.4 | 2.92 | 1.1 | 9.31 |
| 18 | "Necessary Evil" | March 29, 2020 | Sunday 10:00 p.m. | 0.7 | 6.50 | 0.4 | 2.93 | 1.1 | 9.43 |
| 19 | "Monolith" | April 12, 2020 | Sunday 10:00 p.m. | 0.6 | 5.88 | 0.5 | 3.28 | 1.1 | 9.16 |
| 20 | "Predators" | April 19, 2020 | Sunday 10:00 p.m. | 0.6 | 6.24 | 0.4 | 3.23 | 1.0 | 9.47 |

== Home media ==
NCIS: New Orleans: The Sixth Season
| Set details | Special features | |
| Media Format: NTSC, Subtitled; Run time: 14 hours | Six of One (Exclusive) - A season six retrospective with the series showrunners.; The Demise of Christopher Lasalle | |
DVD release dates
| Region 1 | Region 2 | Region 4 |
| August 11, 2020 | | |
