= NCIS: New Orleans season 5 =

NCIS: New Orleans
- Season 5
- Season 5 U.S. DVD cover
- Showrunner: Christopher Silber
- Starring: Scott Bakula; Lucas Black; Vanessa Ferlito; Necar Zadegan; Rob Kerkovich; Daryl "Chill" Mitchell; C. C. H. Pounder
- No. of episodes: 24

Release
- Original network: CBS
- Original release: September 25, 2018 – May 14, 2019

Season chronology
- ← Previous; Season 4 Next → Season 6

The fifth season of NCIS: New Orleans, an American police procedural drama television series, originally aired on CBS from September 25, 2018, through May 14, 2019. The season was produced by CBS Television Studios, with Christopher Silber as showrunner and executive producer. This season contained its 100th episode.

== Cast and characters ==
=== Main ===
- Scott Bakula as Dwayne Cassius Pride, NCIS Supervisory Special Agent (SSA), later NCIS Southeast Field Office Special Agent-in-Charge (SAC)
- Lucas Black as Christopher LaSalle, NCIS Senior Field Agent (SFA), Second in Command
- Vanessa Ferlito as Tammy Gregorio, NCIS Special Agent (SA)
- Necar Zadegan as Hannah Khoury, NCIS SSA and Team Leader
- Rob Kerkovich as Sebastian Lund, NCIS Forensic Special Agent
- Daryl "Chill" Mitchell as Patton Plame, NCIS Computer Specialist
- CCH Pounder as Loretta Wade, Jefferson Parish Medical Examiner

=== Recurring ===
- Ellen Hollman as Amelia Parsons Stone, ex-CIA assassin.
- Jason Alan Carvell as Jimmy Boyd, Dwayne's younger, previously unknown half-brother.
- Chelsea Field as Rita Devereaux, Dwayne's girlfriend.
- Shanley Caswell as Laurel Pride, Dwayne's daughter by his ex-wife, Linda Pride.
- Stacy Keach as Cassius Pride, Dwayne's estranged father and an ex-con.
- Amy Rutberg as Megan Sutter's ghost/The Angel of Death
- Derek Webster as Raymond Isler, FBI Senior Special Agent

=== Guests ===
- Mark Harmon as Leroy Jethro Gibbs, NCIS Supervisory Special Agent (SSA) assigned to Washington's Navy Yard
- Carlos Gomez as Dan Sachez, NCIS Deputy Director
- Izzie Steele as Carmen Delahoy
- LeVar Burton as Rufus Nero
- Mark Gessner as Oliver Crane
- Liza Lapira as Aminta Jax
- Hal Ozsan as Ryan Porter
- Kate Burton as Angela Prescott
- Tom Arnold as Elvis Bertrand

== Episodes ==
No. overall	No. in season	Title	Directed by	Written by	Original release date	Prod. code	U.S. viewers (millions)
96	1	"See You Soon"	James Hayman	Christopher Silber	September 25, 2018	NO501	8.97
As Pride fights for his life in the ICU, the rest of the team searches for Amelia Parsons before she can finish Pride off.
97	2	"Inside Out"	Edward Ornelas	Adam Targum	October 2, 2018	NO502	7.84
The team is on the hunt for a group of trained killers responsible for bringing an IRA bombmaker to New Orleans; Pride is offered a promotion to Regional Special Agent in Charge and as he considers it, Agent Hannah Khoury arrives at the office as Pride's replacement.
98	3	"Diplomatic Immunity"	Gordon Lonsdale	Greta Heinemann & Rob Kerkovich	October 9, 2018	NO503	7.91
The investigation into the murder of a Navy commander attached to an international summit gets complicated when a key figure in the investigation gets close to Sebastian; Pride adjusts to his new position as Regional SAC.
99	4	"Legacy"	LeVar Burton	Chad Gomez Creasey	October 16, 2018	NO504	7.20
The NCIS team investigates the murder of a petty officer who was found under a shrimp fishing boat. Meanwhile, Pride assists LaSalle in his late father's business which is being investigated for Tax fraud by the IRS.
100	5	"In the Blood"	James Whitmore Jr.	Ron McGee	October 23, 2018	NO505	7.12
When a box of Pride's childhood mementos is found in a storage container where four white supremacists were murdered, the investigation leads Pride to face the past and uncovering his father's secrets.
101	6	"Pound of Flesh"	Hart Bochner	Talicia Raggs	October 30, 2018	NO506	7.56
Pride receives news that his assistant had escaped from a kidnapper and the NCIS team investigates. They discover that the kidnapper was interested in harvesting her organs to sell them on the black market. Meanwhile, Pride turns to an ally to help him cope with his near death experience.
102	7	"Sheepdogs"	Michael Zinberg	Brooke Roberts	November 13, 2018	NO507	7.58
The team investigates a car bombing near the French Quarters which leads to a series of bombings around New Orleans. Meanwhile, Gregorio discovers that Hannah has a daughter.
103	8	"Close to Home"	Tony Wharmby	Katherine Beattie	November 20, 2018	NO508	7.47
The NCIS Team puts an informant in protective custody during a murder investigation. Meanwhile, Pride needs help from his brother in order to become trusted by an informant.
104	9	"Risk Assessment"	Tessa Blake	Elizabeth Rinehart	December 4, 2018	NO509	8.33
After a Navy contractor is mysteriously murdered, the team begins their investigation and unearths evidence that the victim lived two separate lives for decades.
105	10	"Tick Tock"	Stacey K. Black	Christopher Silber	December 11, 2018	NO510	7.76
Pride is taken by two masked men during a sunrise jog and forced to perform a series of tasks for them in order to save Wade and his father, who are being held captive.
106	11	"Vindicta"	James Hayman	Adam Targum	January 15, 2019	NO511	7.29
Following Pride's father's death, the NCIS team looks into the people responsible. Pride suspects that former Intelligence agents might be involved.
107	12	"Desperate Navy Wives"	Michael Zinberg	Chad Gomez Creasey	January 22, 2019	NO512	6.70
While undercover, Gregorio joins a social club for military wives after one of the members is contacted by an ex-boyfriend. a wanted fugitive on the FBI Most Wanted List.
108	13	"X"	Mary Lou Belli	Greta Heinemann	February 12, 2019	NO513	7.16
The NCIS team investigates the disappearance of a Biologist who is carrying a deadly biological weapon after a mass shooting at their lab. Meanwhile, Gregorio and Sebastian bicker about each other’s habits as new roommates. Also, Hannah returns to New Orleans early following a personal leave.
109	14	"Conspiracy Theories"	Tessa Blake	Ron McGee	February 19, 2019	NO514	7.03
Pride and his team reunite with a social media journalist who was on his latest case when his vigilante turns up murdered. Meanwhile, Hannah gets a surprise from her former CIA partner.
110	15	"Crab Mentality"	Stacey K. Black	Brooke Roberts	February 26, 2019	NO515	7.19
The team investigates a series of murders at a local construction site known for creating special chemicals for sea walls. Meanwhile, Hannah’s investigation into finding her former partner hits new heights.
111	16	"Survivor"	James Whitmore Jr.	Cameron Dupuy & Sydney Mitchel	March 12, 2019	NO516	6.98
Hannah is forced to put her daughter in protective custody after she discovers that a terrorist that she was tracking down when she was in the CIA resurfaces and is after her and her family. Meanwhile, Pride and the rest of the team investigates the terrorist's whereabouts.
112	17	"Reckoning"	Gordon Lonsdale	Christopher Silber & Adam Targum	March 26, 2019	NO517	7.18
Pride returns to the New Orleans office after he discovers that he had been re-assigned. Meanwhile, the NCIS team investigates the disappearance of a petty officer.
113	18	"In Plain Sight"	LeVar Burton	Katherine Beattie	April 2, 2019	NO518	7.19
The NCIS team investigates the murder of Patton's friend, a former Navy Seal gunned down in a drive-by shooting, while he watched.
114	19	"A House Divided"	Deborah Reinisch	Elizabeth Rinehart	April 9, 2019	NO519	6.69
Pride and his team investigate the murder of a person from a wealthy family. Roadblocks begin to arise when the family’s lawyer begins to cover-up for them and try to rule the death an accident.
115	20	"Jackpot"	Mary Lou Belli	Talicia Raggs	April 16, 2019	NO520	6.54
Elvis Bertrand asks for Pride to prove his daughter's innocence when she is connected to a murder case that NCIS is investigating.
116	21	"Trust Me"	Jen Derwingson-Peacock	Austin Badgett & Ron McGee	April 23, 2019	NO521	6.46
The team investigates the murder of a doctor who was killed in what was supposed to look like an accident. Gregorio begins to grow suspicious that one of the victim's father might be involved. Meanwhile, Hannah’s husband re-emerges and asks for Pride's help on new intel on Apollyon.
117	22	"Chaos Theory"	Edward Ornelas	Brooke Roberts	April 30, 2019	NO522	7.16
Pride and his team investigate a series of bombings all across New Orleans when one killed over 5 in a museum.
118	23	"The River Styx"	James Hayman	Chad Gomez Creasey	May 7, 2019	NO523	6.68
119	24	"The River Styx"	James Whitmore Jr.	Christopher Silber	May 14, 2019	NO524	6.93
Part I: Time is of the essence when an FBI operation to catch the Apollyon leader goes terribly wrong and Pride and LaSalle are forced to rescue FBI Special Agent Isler who is being held captive in South Ossetia. Part II: Hannah and the rest of the team race against the clock to rescue Pride from the Apollyon leader and to not reveal confidential information. Meanwhile, while being held captive and drugged, Pride begins to experience hallucinations at various points and alternate timelines of his life.

== Production ==
=== Development ===
NCIS: New Orleans was renewed for a fifth season on April 18, 2018, with a 24-episode order. The season contains its 100th episode. NCIS: New Orleans was renewed for a sixth season on April 22, 2019.

=== Casting ===
On August 24, 2018, it was announced that Necar Zadegan would join the cast as Special Agent Hannah Khoury as a new series regular.

== Broadcast ==
Season five of NCIS: New Orleans premiered on CBS on September 25, 2018.

== Reception ==
=== Ratings ===
Viewership and ratings per episode of NCIS: New Orleans season 5
No.	Title	Air date	Rating/share (18–49)	Viewers (millions)	DVR (18–49)	DVR viewers (millions)	Total (18–49)	Total viewers (millions)
1	"See You Soon"	September 25, 2018	1.0/5	8.97	0.7	3.75	1.7	12.72
2	"Inside Out"	October 2, 2018	1.0/5	7.84	0.7	3.73	1.7	11.57
3	"Diplomatic Immunity"	October 9, 2018	0.9/4	7.91	—N/a	3.41	—N/a	11.32
4	"Legacy"	October 16, 2018	0.8/3	7.20	0.6	3.46	1.4	10.66
5	"In the Blood"	October 23, 2018	0.8/3	7.12	0.6	3.53	1.4	10.66
6	"Pound of Flesh"	October 30, 2018	0.9/4	7.56	0.5	3.42	1.4	10.99
7	"Sheepdogs"	November 13, 2018	0.9/4	7.58	0.7	3.78	1.6	11.36
8	"Close to Home"	November 20, 2018	0.8/3	7.47	0.6	3.43	1.4	10.90
9	"Risk Assessment"	December 4, 2018	0.9/4	8.33	0.6	3.72	1.5	12.05
10	"Tick Tock"	December 11, 2018	0.8/3	7.76	0.6	3.60	1.4	11.36
11	"Vindicta"	January 15, 2019	0.8/4	7.29	0.6	3.54	1.4	10.83
12	"Desperate Navy Wives"	January 22, 2019	0.8/4	6.70	0.6	3.66	1.4	10.36
13	"X"	February 12, 2019	0.8/3	7.16	0.6	3.69	1.4	10.85
14	"Conspiracy Theories"	February 19, 2019	0.8/4	7.03	0.6	3.91	1.4	10.94
15	"Crab Mentality"	February 26, 2019	0.8/4	7.19	0.6	3.94	1.4	11.13
16	"Survivor"	March 12, 2019	0.7/3	6.98	0.5	3.31	1.2	10.29
17	"Reckoning"	March 26, 2019	0.7/4	7.18	0.6	3.76	1.3	10.95
18	"In Plain Sight"	April 2, 2019	0.8/4	7.19	0.5	3.38	1.3	10.57
19	"A House Divided"	April 9, 2019	0.6/3	6.69	0.6	3.54	1.2	10.23
20	"Jackpot"	April 16, 2019	0.7/3	6.54	0.6	3.61	1.3	10.15
21	"Trust Me"	April 23, 2019	0.6/3	6.46	0.5	3.21	1.1	9.68
22	"Chaos Theory"	April 30, 2019	0.7/3	7.16	0.5	3.35	1.2	10.51
23	"The River Styx, Part I"	May 7, 2019	0.7/4	6.68	0.5	3.24	1.2	9.92
24	"The River Styx, Part II"	May 14, 2019	0.6/3	6.93	0.5	3.12	1.1	10.05
