= NCIS: New Orleans season 4 =

NCIS: New Orleans
- Season 4
- Season 4 U.S. DVD cover
- Showrunners: Christopher Silber; Brad Kern
- Starring: Scott Bakula; Lucas Black; Vanessa Ferlito; Rob Kerkovich; Daryl "Chill" Mitchell; Shalita Grant; C. C. H. Pounder
- No. of episodes: 24

Release
- Original network: CBS
- Original release: September 26, 2017 – May 15, 2018

Season chronology
- ← Previous; Season 3 Next → Season 5

The fourth season of NCIS: New Orleans, an American police procedural drama television series, originally aired on CBS from September 26, 2017, to May 15, 2018. The season was produced by CBS Television Studios.

== Cast and characters ==
=== Main ===
- Scott Bakula as Dwayne Cassius Pride, NCIS Supervisory Special Agent (SSA)
- Lucas Black as Christopher LaSalle, NCIS Senior Field Agent (SFA)
- Vanessa Ferlito as Tammy Gregorio, NCIS Special Agent (SA)
- Rob Kerkovich as Sebastian Lund, NCIS SA
- Daryl "Chill" Mitchell as Patton Plame, NCIS Computer Specialist
- Shalita Grant as Sonja Percy, NCIS SA (episodes 1–19)
- CCH Pounder as Loretta Wade, Jefferson Parish Medical Examiner

=== Recurring ===
- Shanley Caswell as Laurel Pride, Dwayne Pride's daughter
- Christopher Meyer as Danny Malloy, Loretta's elder foster son
- Derek Webster as Raymond Isler, FBI Senior Special Agent
- Chelsea Field as Rita Devereaux, Pride's lover
- Riann Steele as Sydney Halliday
- Amanda Warren as Zahra Taylor, interim mayor and later Mayor of New Orleans
- Matt Servitto as Carl Estes, NOPD captain
- Mark Gessner as Oliver Crane
- Doug Savant as U.S. Associate Attorney General (AAG) Eric Barlow
- Ellen Hollman as Amelia Parsons Stone, AAG Barlow's aide
- Lou Diamond Phillips as Deputy Chief Gossett, AAG Barlow's accomplice
- Antino Crowley-Kamenwati as Lonzo Cortez, AAG Barlow's accomplice
- Stacy Keach as Cassius Pride, Dwayne Pride's incarcerated father
- Steven Waldren as Roy, the NCIS Security Guard

=== Guests ===
- Carlos Gomez as Dan Sanchez, NCIS Deputy Director
- Cassidy Freeman as Eva Azarova
- Kelly Hu as Doctor Anna Yoon, Ex-wife of Patton
- Steven Weber as Douglas Hamilton, disgraced former Mayor of New Orleans.
- Joey Vahedi as Sharif Saadi
- Peter Rini as Vernon Butler, Taylor's opponent in the mayoral election.
- Najla Said as Noora Saadi
- Michael Mulheren as Ron Cook
- Sarah Schreiber as Female Dealer

== Episodes ==
No. overall	No. in season	Title	Directed by	Written by	Original release date	Prod. code	U.S. viewers (millions)
72	1	"Rogue Nation"	James Hayman	Brad Kern	September 26, 2017	NO401	8.78
With Pride on administrative leave following Mayor Hamilton's takedown, he's replaced by a by-the-book Supervisor Paula Boyd (Becky Ann Baker). Meanwhile, the NCIS team investigates a vehicular homicide involving stolen radioactive nuclear waste. Later on, they discover that the perpetrator is trying to make a dirty bomb.
73	2	"#1 Fan"	Hart Bochner	Zach Strauss	October 3, 2017	NO326	9.23
While Pride's packing for a father/daughter fishing weekend, a mysterious woman (Dendrie Taylor) shows up at headquarters with intel about a serial killer targeting women on the Gulf of Mexico. Things take a dramatic turn when the woman kidnaps Pride to get him to listen to her.
74	3	"The Asset"	Tony Wharmby	Christopher Silber	October 10, 2017	NO402	9.52
The team joins forces with FBI Director Isler after a Russian operative with intelligence on sleeper agents disappears; Tammy partners with former sleeper agent Eva Azarova to assist in the investigation.
75	4	"Dead Man Calling"	Michael Zinberg	Greta Heinemann	October 17, 2017	NO403	9.54
Pride and his team investigate the murder of a petty officer at the scene of a 150-year-old cold case. Pride later thinks this could be a copycat murder. Gregorio reveals that she has a fear of ghosts when she discovers that the case is connected to a séance.
76	5	"Viral"	LeVar Burton	Chad Gomez Creasey	October 24, 2017	NO404	9.52
Pride and his team help Sebastian out when he's put on administrative leave after a foot chase of a high-value target ends with Sebastian shooting what appears to be an innocent bystander.
77	6	"Acceptable Loss"	Mary Lou Belli	Brooke Roberts	October 31, 2017	NO405	8.86
The team investigates the murder of a petty officer who was killed in a mysterious way. They struggle to find evidence as the perpetrator covers their tracks. LaSalle's father visits New Orleans to discuss taking over his family business.
78	7	"The Accident"	LeVar Burton	Teleplay by : Ron McGee; Story by : Ron McGee & Michael Gemballa	November 7, 2017	NO325	9.22
Patton is forced to put himself into an uncomfortable situation by working with his ex-wife (Kelly Hu) when her clinical trial for injured veterans gets hacked by expert hackers.
79	8	"Sins of the Father"	James Whitmore Jr.	Paul Guyot	November 14, 2017	NO406	9.67
Wade's son Danny calls Pride for help after he's attacked at his girlfriend's house and she goes missing. The director of NCIS mandates that Pride meet with a therapist to discuss his process for solving cases.
80	9	"Hard Knock Life"	Deborah Reinisch	Talicia Raggs	November 21, 2017	NO407	7.99
Pride second-guesses evidence suggesting homeless kids are the suspects in the murder of a petty officer.
81	10	"Mirror, Mirror"	Geary McLeod	Brad Kern & Lynne E. Litt	December 12, 2017	NO408	8.21
Pride is livid when he finds out that ex-Mayor Hamilton is trying to make deals to get out of prison. The team race to find the identity of his partner to keep Hamilton in prison.
82	11	"Monster"	Rob Greenlea	Christopher Silber	January 2, 2018	NO409	9.10
Pride is forced to put Percy on the sidelines when a robbery case involving a high-speed chase turns deadly, as the investigation leads to her former ATF partner.
83	12	"Identity Crisis"	Gordon Lonsdale	Taylor Streitz	January 9, 2018	NO410	8.70
While Pride is away, Sebastian takes lead of the team and is dealt a case involving an old classmate accused of murdering her business partner. The NCIS headquarters computer system gets hacked by an expert hacker.
84	13	"Ties That Bind"	James Hayman	Ron McGee & Katherine Beattie	January 23, 2018	NO411	9.30
Pride and his team investigate the murder of a petty officer who worked at a local nightclub bar that he and his mother used to play at weekly. Gregorio suspects it might be drug-related. LaSalle receives news that his father has died and he's the executor of his estate and his company.
85	14	"A New Dawn"	Michael Zinberg	Greta Heinemann	February 6, 2018	NO412	8.38
It's Mardi Gras in New Orleans and Pride's team investigates the murder of a petty officer who was trying to help a Syrian refugee, previously falsely accused as the killer, from being recruited to a terrorist group threatening interim Mayor Taylor's life. Wade helps Taylor's ultimately successful campaign for the special election.
86	15	"The Last Mile"	Stacey K. Black	Chad Gomez Creasey	February 27, 2018	NO413	8.26
FBI Agent Isler's undercover assignment into opioid thefts goes sideways. Isler asks Pride and his team for their help, though it's strictly off the books.
87	16	"Empathy"	Tessa Blake	Paul Guyot	March 6, 2018	NO414	8.44
Pride and his team investigate the disappearance of a congressional aide after she was ambushed by men posing as agents. LaSalle makes difficult decisions on behalf of his brother.
88	17	"Treasure Hunt"	Tony Wharmby	Brooke Roberts	March 13, 2018	NO415	9.25
The team investigates the murder of a Navy captain and follow her footsteps along with her father in the search for a lost 200-year-old fleur de lis.
89	18	"Welcome to the Jungle"	James Whitmore Jr.	Christopher Silber & Austin Badgett	March 27, 2018	NO416	8.53
Pride, Gregorio and Sebastian travel to South America to help out with one of Pride's colleagues whose Army mission gets compromised. Meanwhile, Percy receives a job offer at the FBI and is hesitant to tell Pride.
90	19	"High Stakes"	LeVar Burton	Ron McGee	April 3, 2018	NO417	8.43
Percy and LaSalle go undercover at a high-stakes, underground poker game after the organizer targets players with access to a naval research laboratory. Also, Laurel Pride (Shanley Caswell) visits her dad during spring break to discuss options after her upcoming graduation. Note: This episode marks the final appearance of Shalita Grant as a series regular.
91	20	"Powder Keg"	Mary Lou Belli	Talicia Raggs	April 17, 2018	NO418	8.46
Pride and his bar patrons, including Sydney Halliday (Riann Steele) who's visiting Pride after leaving the Army, are held hostage by a group of volatile thieves.
92	21	"Mind Games"	Gordon Lonsdale	Greta Heinemann & Taylor Streitz	May 1, 2018	NO419	8.13
The team investigates the brutal murder of a pilot, which bears a striking resemblance to a case used in Gregorio's profiling training. Soon Gregorio discovers that her old professor is actually a serial killer - and that she's the next target.
93	22	"The Assassination of Dwayne Pride"	Edward Ornelas	Teleplay by : Ron McGee & Katherine Beattie; Story by : Chad Gomez Creasey & Katherine Beattie	May 8, 2018	NO420	8.11
When a scathing article criticizing Pride's use of excessive force is published, the team gets concerned with the classified files used as sources and Rita returns to warn Pride that this is part of a plot to bring him and the NOLA NCIS office down.
94	23	"Checkmate"	James Hayman	Brad Kern	May 15, 2018	NO421	9.44
95	24	"Checkmate"	James Whitmore Jr.	Christopher Silber	May 15, 2018	NO422	9.44
Part I : As Pride faces an indictment for abuse of power and discovering the person behind it all, he recruits an off-the-books team to help him figure out why he's been targeted - and what the endgame is. Part II : The NCIS team races against time and a dangerous, well-connected opponent to prevent a terrorist attack on the New Orleans Tricentennial Fleet Week; LaSalle makes a shocking discovery about his family's business (though he initially believed that it was a stall tactic from the opponent, only to later find out how real it turned out to be).

== Production ==
=== Development ===
NCIS: New Orleans was renewed for a fourth season on March 23, 2017, with a 24-episode order. NCIS: New Orleans was renewed for a fifth season on April 18, 2018.

=== Casting ===
On January 31, 2018, Shalita Grant who plays NCIS agent Sonja Percy would be departing after the nineteenth episode of the season.

== Broadcast ==
Season four of NCIS New Orleans premiered on September 26, 2017.

== Ratings ==
Viewership and ratings per episode of NCIS: New Orleans season 4
No.	Title	Air date	Rating/share (18–49)	Viewers (millions)	DVR (18–49)	DVR viewers (millions)	Total (18–49)	Total viewers (millions)
1	"Rogue Nation"	September 26, 2017	1.0/4	8.78	0.7	3.93	1.7	12.71
2	"#1 Fan"	October 3, 2017	1.0/4	9.23	—N/a	3.45	—N/a	12.69
3	"The Asset"	October 10, 2017	1.0/4	9.52	—N/a	3.10	—N/a	12.62
4	"Dead Man Calling"	October 17, 2017	1.1/4	9.54	0.7	3.88	1.8	13.42
5	"Viral"	October 24, 2017	1.1/4	9.52	—N/a	3.64	—N/a	13.16
6	"Acceptable Loss"	October 31, 2017	0.9/4	8.86	0.7	3.61	1.6	12.47
7	"The Accident"	November 7, 2017	1.0/4	9.22	0.7	3.75	1.7	12.97
8	"Sins of the Father"	November 14, 2017	1.1/4	9.67	0.7	3.62	1.8	13.32
9	"Hard Knock Life"	November 21, 2017	0.9/4	7.99	0.7	3.49	1.6	11.49
10	"Mirror, Mirror"	December 12, 2017	0.9/3	8.21	—N/a	—N/a	—N/a	—N/a
11	"Monster"	January 2, 2018	1.0/4	9.10	—N/a	—N/a	—N/a	—N/a
12	"Identity Crisis"	January 9, 2018	1.0/4	8.70	0.8	4.15	1.8	12.80
13	"Ties That Bind"	January 23, 2018	1.0/4	9.30	0.8	4.31	1.8	13.62
14	"A New Dawn"	February 6, 2018	0.9/4	8.38	0.7	4.17	1.6	12.55
15	"The Last Mile"	February 27, 2018	0.9/4	8.26	0.8	4.35	1.7	12.62
16	"Empathy"	March 6, 2018	0.9/4	8.44	0.7	4.29	1.6	12.73
17	"Treasure Hunt"	March 13, 2018	1.0/4	9.25	0.7	3.95	1.7	13.20
18	"Welcome to the Jungle"	March 27, 2018	0.9/4	8.53	0.8	4.18	1.7	12.71
19	"High Stakes"	April 3, 2018	0.9/4	8.43	0.6	3.67	1.5	12.11
20	"Powder Keg"	April 17, 2018	0.8/3	8.46	0.7	3.70	1.5	12.16
21	"Mind Games"	May 1, 2018	0.9/4	8.13	—N/a	3.54	—N/a	11.68
22	"The Assassination of Dwayne Pride"	May 8, 2018	0.8/3	8.11	—N/a	3.42	—N/a	11.56
23	"Checkmate, Part I"	May 15, 2018	0.9/4	9.44	0.5	2.90	1.4	12.34
24	"Checkmate, Part II"	May 15, 2018	0.9/4	9.44	0.5	2.90	1.4	12.34
