= NCIS: New Orleans season 1 =

NCIS: New Orleans
- Season 1
- Season 1 U.S. DVD cover
- Showrunners: Jeffrey Lieber; Gary Glasberg
- Starring: Scott Bakula; Lucas Black; Zoe McLellan; Rob Kerkovich; C. C. H. Pounder
- No. of episodes: 23

Release
- Original network: CBS
- Original release: September 23, 2014 – May 12, 2015

Season chronology
- ← Previous; NCIS Season 11 Next → Season 2

The first season of NCIS: New Orleans, an American police procedural drama television series, originally aired on CBS from September 23, 2014, through May 12, 2015. The season was produced by CBS Television Studios, with Gary Glasberg as showrunner and executive producer. The pilot was aired on March 25, 2014, to April 1, 2014, serves as the first of a two-part backdoor pilot during the eleventh season of NCIS and ordered to series in May 2014. On October 27, 2014, CBS picked up NCIS: New Orleans for a full season of 23 episodes.

== Plot ==
The first season of NCIS: New Orleans follows the work of Special Agent Dwayne Pride, who leads a New Orleans–based investigative team tasked with solving crimes involving the US Navy and Marine Corps. Pride and Chris LaSalle work alongside new-transfer Meredith Brody, as they face the loss of friends ("Musician Heal Thyself"), battle a suspected plague outbreak ("Carrier"), and investigate cases including a brig break ("Breaking Brig"), a murder at a sorority house ("The Recruits"), a kidnapping that brings the FBI to New Orleans ("It Happened Last Night"), a murder at a cemetery on Halloween ("Master of Horror"), a death at Mardi Gras ("Love Hurts"), a bomber targeting Pride and his family ("Baitfish"), a case that calls for NCIS to work alongside CGIS ("The Abyss"), and a sailor who asks for his own murder to be investigated ("The Walking Dead"), all while facing the death of loved ones ("How Much Pain Can You Take?").

== Cast and characters ==
=== Main ===
- Scott Bakula as Dwayne Cassius Pride, NCIS Supervisory Special Agent (SSA) assigned to the New Orleans Office
- Lucas Black as Christopher LaSalle, NCIS Senior Special Agent, second in command
- Zoe McLellan as Meredith Brody, NCIS Special Agent from the closed Chicago Field Office, recruited to the New Orleans office
- Rob Kerkovich as Sebastian Lund, Jefferson Parish Forensic Specialist for NCIS
- CCH Pounder as Loretta Wade, Jefferson Parish Medical Examiner for NCIS

=== Recurring ===
- Shalita Grant as Sonja Percy, ATF Special Agent
- Daryl Mitchell as Patton Plame, NCIS Computer Specialist
- Shanley Caswell as Laurel Pride, Dwayne Pride's daughter
- Callie Thorne as Sasha Broussard, former member of the New Orleans Broussard crime syndicate
- Steven Weber as Douglas Hamilton, Republican New Orleans city councilman of District C.
- John Livingston as Paul “Baitfish” Jenks, former member of the New Orleans Broussard crime syndicate and Confidential Informant for Dwayne Pride
- Gillian Alexy as Savannah Kelly, long time love interest of LaSalle
- Dylan Walsh as Jim Messier, Captain with New Orleans Police Department
- Clayne Crawford as Cade LaSalle, Christopher LaSalle's brother
- Dean Stockwell as Tom Hamilton, Douglas' father
- Christopher Meyer as Danny Malloy, Loretta's eldest foster son (C.J.'s brother)
- Dani Dare as C.J. Malloy, Loretta's youngest foster son (Danny's brother)
- Stacy Keach as Cassius Pride, Dwayne Pride's imprisoned father

=== Guests ===
- Mark Harmon as Leroy Jethro Gibbs, NCIS Supervisory Special Agent (SSA) of the Major Case Response Team (MCRT) assigned to Washington's Navy Yard
- Michael Weatherly as Anthony DiNozzo, NCIS Special Agent, second in command of MCRT
- Pauley Perrette as Abigail Sciuto, Forensic Specialist for NCIS in D.C.
- Rocky Carroll as Leon Vance, NCIS Director stationed in D.C.
- Felisha Terrell as Navy Lt Adele "Addie" Watkins
- David McCallum as Dr. Donald Mallard, Chief Medical Examiner for NCIS in Washington, D.C.
- Joe Spano as Tobias Fornell, FBI Senior Special Agent from D.C.
- Paige Turco as Linda Pride, Dwayne's estranged wife
- Diane Neal as Abigail Borin, CGIS Special Agent in Charge
- Meredith Eaton as Carol Wilson, immunologist and friend of Abby Sciuto

== Episodes ==
No. overall	No. in season	Title	Directed by	Written by	Original release date	Prod. code	U.S. viewers (millions)
1	1	"Musician Heal Thyself"	Michael Zinberg	Jeffrey Lieber	September 23, 2014	NO101	17.22
The New Orleans team investigate the discovery of a severed leg found at a marina with the leg later revealed to have belonged to a recently murdered Navy Petty Officer Second Class who Pride mentored, prompting the team to investigate the crime. Brody, having joined the NCIS: New Orleans team on a permanent basis (in the NCIS season eleven episode, "Crescent City") is trying to get acquainted with New Orleans. NCIS Medical Examiner, Dr. Donald "Ducky" Mallard later offers both Wade and Pride some insight into the case.
2	2	"Carrier"	James Whitmore Jr.	Gary Glasberg	September 30, 2014	NO103	16.57
When a Navy lieutenant on liberty dies in downtown New Orleans after being hit by a taxi, the team investigate what happened, but things soon take a turn when the autopsy reveals that the victim died of the bubonic plague and that the death is connected to a potential bioterrorist attack on a Navy ship, the U.S.S. Geronimo. As the team begin rounding up those assigned to the ship, they receive assistance from NCIS Director Leon Vance with CDC officer Carol Wilson and NCIS Special Agent Anthony "Tony" DiNozzo both arriving in New Orleans to help with the case.
3	3	"Breaking Brig"	Tony Wharmby	Laurie Arent	October 7, 2014	NO104	15.41
When a bus crashes into a ditch resulting in three prisoners who were en route to the Naval Brig in Charleston escaping and the deaths of two security guards and a prisoner, the team soon discovers that one of them is a wanted criminal who poses a threat to national security. NCIS Director Leon Vance and Pride's friend, fellow NCIS Special Agent Leroy Jethro Gibbs both assist in the search with the investigation.
4	4	"The Recruits"	Oz Scott	Sam Humphrey	October 14, 2014	NO105	16.14
At a New Orleans Polytechnic University sorority house party, Tilda finds Natalie Lane with Navy SEAL PO1 T.J. Blake who was shot dead. University Police Officer Mike Banton responds first. Blake's BUDS instructor, Master Chief Erik T. Benson, directs Pride to Max Wolf; "not a SEAL" but a mercenary from their classified Somalia mission. LaSalle's college friend Heather confirms Blake and Wolf argued. Wolf claims Natalie is a hooker. LaSalle consults his C.I., Ross P, while Pride questions Tilda who claims she and Natalie are tutors. He surreptitiously takes photos of her expensive accessories. NCIS Computer Specialist Patton Plame reveals that Tutorzone.com is actually a front for an illegal "collegiate call girls" ring. After Natalie is nearly run over, Jefferson Parish Forensic Specialist Sebastian Lund matches the bullet to a Russian mafia hit, implicating them in the prostitution ring. Ross P. sets a meet between LaSalle and Vlad Stahl. When Sebastian determines how the silencer was made, the team connects the evidence to the killer, who, under pressure, gives up the ringleader. Meanwhile, Pride's daughter Laurel visits, and wants to move his upright Hamilton piano from her dorm into the NCIS office.
5	5	"It Happened Last Night"	Arvin Brown	Jack Bernstein	October 21, 2014	NO102	16.13
When a chief warrant officer who specialized in counterintelligence is found dead from waterboarding, the team discover that the victim's wife has been kidnapped and is being held for ransom. FBI agent Tobias Fornell arrives in New Orleans to assist Pride and the team with the case.
6	6	"Master of Horror"	Terrence O'Hara	Scott D. Shapiro	October 28, 2014	NO106	16.09
As New Orleans prepares to celebrate Halloween, a Naval Staff Judge Advocate is found in a cemetery murdered "vampire-style" with the team discovering that an unlikely suspect is responsible and that a woman's life is hanging in the balance. Meanwhile, Brody and LaSalle compare costumes.
7	7	"Watch Over Me"	James Hayman	David Appelbaum	November 11, 2014	NO107	14.99
Navy Commander Darby Wilson, with top secret clearance at the Office of Naval Research, is killed by another motorist, and his assistant Rebecca Ortega is shot to death. The neighbor Bart Roberts says Darby and his wife Katherine always argued, and Rebecca visited regularly. Navy Captain Roger Marcus, concerned about sensitive intelligence, says Wilson was a tech liaison with Axelrod Industries. NCIS Special Agent Meredith Brody learns that Rebecca was involved with Lieutenant Clementine Hill, not Darby. Sebastian finds a biotracker in Darby's corpse that hijacks electronic devices to spy on him. Head of security Oscar Randolph takes Pride to Jason Axelrod and Alexandra Schwartz, who describes their work. Pride finds the other vehicle at Katherine's place; a masked man fires at him before fleeing. She says Darby was meeting Shang Lee, who was also shot dead. As Pride watches over Katherine, the killer tries again. Pride surmises he's after the necklace Darby bought her, which they find has an SD card containing Axelrod's data on a defective hypervelocity missile. They set a trap to find who hired the killer. Meanwhile, Pride tries to fix his wife Linda's Volkswagen Karmann Ghia.
8	8	"Love Hurts"	Michael Pressman	Jack Bernstein	November 18, 2014	NO108	16.86
A petty officer is found dead in a Mardi Gras float storage facility with an engagement ring and proposal plan in hand. The investigation takes a mysterious turn when the team are unable to locate his supposed long-term girlfriend, but things change when it is revealed that a murderous Colombian assassin is in the city and plan on killing a group of Navy and Marine personnel who hope to stop the flow of drugs into South America.
9	9	"Chasing Ghosts"	James Whitmore Jr.	Jonathan I. Kidd & Sonya Winton	November 25, 2014	NO109	14.47
The team investigates a 40-year-old cold case about a murder of a chief petty officer which hits close to home for Dr. Wade. However, an exhumation of the body reveals some unexpected evidence that may change everything. Meanwhile, Sebastian gets into the Thanksgiving mood and Laurel brings home her boyfriend.
10	10	"Stolen Valor"	Dennis Smith	Laurie Arent	December 16, 2014	NO110	14.14
A former SEAL who hunts military impostors is found dead at a museum, and the team's investigation leads them to find the jacket of a Marine who was presumed killed in Afghanistan. When the investigation reveals that the Marine may still be alive, both Pride and LaSalle travel to Afghanistan in an attempt to bring him home. Meanwhile, Brody wonders about LaSalle's issues with Christmas.
11	11	"Baitfish"	Leslie Libman	Teleplay by : Jeffrey Lieber; Story by : Jeffrey Lieber & Jeremiah Tash	January 6, 2015	NO111	17.73
While attending the Navy-Marine Relief Gala, a deadly explosion happens, putting Laurel Pride's boyfriend in the hospital. The team learns that Pride was the intended target and the assassination attempt could be related to one of his old cases.
12	12	"The Abyss"	Terrence O'Hara	Sam Humphrey	January 13, 2015	NO112	16.39
CGIS Agent Abigail Borin busts Julio on human smuggling, then finds two murdered grad students aboard the research vessel Acadiana; diver/oceanographer Mark Post and ecologists/biologist Cindy Rutberg, and a third crew-member missing, biologist Anna Huntley, daughter of Navy Admiral Adam Huntley. After analyzing paint transfer, the high-end boat thief Clive Roberts is apprehended, but he has an alibi for the murders. Video footage is found that shows Anna holding a Beretta during the attack. Brody suggests re-checking Anna's shipmate bios supplied by her advisor, Dr. Sandra Jones of the Gulf Coast Oceanographic Institute. Sandra suggests there may have been a love triangle. Also, Anna is $90,000 in debt. Sebastian narrows the search area where silver pesos from the mid-1700s Spanish wreck El Cazador are found on the ocean floor, providing another motive. Patton Plame discovers that Steve Merris is selling them for bitcoin on the dark web. Steve claims Anna is his competition, and provides her screen name. The team sets up a buy, but instead catch Professor Jones, not Anna. Pride gives Anna's father the bad news after recovering her body. Meanwhile, LaSalle finds his missing older brother Cade in jail and still struggling with bipolar disorder.
13	13	"The Walking Dead"	Edward Ornelas	David Appelbaum	February 3, 2015	NO113	16.52
A Navy lieutenant commander and a friend of Pride seeks his help to solve his impending murder after he learns he has been poisoned with a lethal dose of radiation. CGIS agent Abigail Borin pairs up with the team again.
14	14	"Careful What You Wish For"	James Hayman	Scott D. Shapiro	February 10, 2015	NO114	16.19
A fellow NCIS agent is shot dead while on security detail for a high-ranking Navy admiral. The team's investigation leads them to discover that the agent was the target due to a secret he knew about a sick child's biological father. Meanwhile, Brody's past is brought up by the security detail leader.
15	15	"Le Carnaval de la Mort"	Tony Wharmby	Jonathan I. Kidd & Sonya Winton	February 17, 2015	NO115	14.70
The stabbing death of a Mardi Gras partygoer leads the team to uncover a gang's plans for a major robbery at the height of the festival. Meanwhile, tensions rise between Pride and Laurel when he learns that she has been secretly visiting Pride's father in prison.
16	16	"My Brother's Keeper"	Oz Scott	Teleplay by : Christopher Ambrose; Story by : Christopher Ambrose & Jonathan I. Kidd & Sonya Winton	February 24, 2015	NO116	13.71
After three Iraq tours and a Purple Heart, single and raising foster brothers Danny and C.J. Malloy, Navy recruiter Petty Officer Maggie Barringer, is murdered by a hit-and-run driver. NCIS finds Maggie's emails to Community Foster Partnership, who are withholding money intended for the children. Fellow foster parents Joe and Jane Trahan confirm, CFP "social worker" Sumner St. Croix earns millions while under investigation for fraud. Confronted by Pride, Sumner leaps to his death. Jefferson Parish ME Loretta Wade uncovers domestic violence, and insists on accompanying Pride to question elder brother Danny. Brody finds Maggie's recent boyfriend Anthony Antonelli is Danny's boss at a sandwich shop. They find Danny has Robinhood PCP stamps in his locker, and he drives ex-con Bull Costigan's Camaro. LaSalle consults his C.I., Ross P.. The team finds Danny prepping PCP. Captured, Danny admits Bull is his father who is using his younger brother C.J. to mule PCP to Mobile, Alabama. At the bus station, Bull is apprehended. Loretta temporarily allows Danny and C.J. to stay with her. Meanwhile, LaSalle gets reacquainted with classmate Savannah Kelly, Cade's new counselor, but worries about Cade's bipolar therapy, complicated by Cade's brand-new girlfriend Windi Stewart.
17	17	"More Now"	Bethany Rooney	Christopher Silber	March 10, 2015	NO117	12.61
After events in "Baitfish," Det. Rolland Clarke finds Dr. Freddy Barlow and Pam Shore shot dead in Charleston, SC. LaSalle and Brody worry about Pride's obsession with catching Paul Jenks, aka "Baitfish," a C.I. that Pride used to bring down the Broussard crime family. Patton finds the connection between Barlow and Batfish; a cloned phone belonging to Frank Broussard at Slidell Federal Penitentiary. Pride arranges a deal to dismiss Frank's drug and bombing charges to get Baitfish, then meets with Sasha Broussard. But Frank is shanked, and the Warden suspects Red Carter. Raiding Barlow's clinic for distributing Oxycodone, they encounter and question ATF Special Agent Sonja Percy. Seems Baitfish may be building a new empire, killing off Broussard syndicate members. Slidell prison guard Milton Lorna is implicated in Frank's murder. When he goes after Sasha, she kills him. After another raid, Pride must let Percy escape with the drugs to maintain her cover. Based on the clue name Leone, Batfish's partner, Pride tells LaSalle and Brody the money traces back to the Latendale Group, whose only shareholder is Sasha Broussard. Pride admits to Percy, he does not have enough to arrest Sasha...yet.
18	18	"The List"	Michael Zinberg	Laurie Arent	March 24, 2015	NO118	14.42
After a Naval officer is found dead in a strip club, the team discovers that his death matches the MO of two unsolved murders, leading them to a mural with the names of unprosecuted killers. The list suggests that a vigilante may be at work. Meanwhile, Brody's ex-fiancé pays her a surprise visit.
19	19	"The Insider"	James Whitmore Jr.	David Appelbaum & Scott D. Shapiro	April 7, 2015	NO119	14.33
In the morgue, Wade, Danny, and Sebastian are held hostage by a criminal who wants a secret that is inside a dead body, forcing Pride and the rest of the team into a desperate race against time to resolve the situation before an FBI team take charge.
20	20	"Rock-a-Bye-Baby"	Elodie Keene	Jonathan I. Kidd & Sonya Winton	April 14, 2015	NO120	14.40
A Navy commander's adopted baby daughter is kidnapped when he leaves her in the car while taking groceries inside, prompting the NCIS team to launch a search for the missing baby. CGIS agent Abigail Borin returns to help them with the case.
21	21	"You'll Do"	Alrick Riley	Sam Humphrey	April 28, 2015	NO121	14.55
LaSalle and his girlfriend Savannah Kelly find Cade's girlfriend Windi Stewart dead in the trunk of Cade's car. Pride takes LaSalle off the case as NOPD Captain Det. Jim Messier investigates. Detectives Simms and Carlyle interrogate Cade. Pride and Brody question Windi's mother Susan about other boyfriends. Pride sends LaSalle to work with undercover ATF Agent Sonja Percy regarding Navy M16s and Beretta M9s stolen by Petty Officer Tom Lyons, but LaSalle insists on helping Cade. He and Brody find a hidden camera in Windi's home, purchased by serial stalker Reid Gorie. Sebastian finds the footage was altered by Gorie, but he has an alibi. Pride suspects someone else had motive. Brody realizes Windi's necklace is tied to other victims and questions a witness. Sebastian's tox screen reveals Cade was roofied at the bar by Kai Bryant, so Eloise Sanchez can pray to Erzulie while Kai committed the sex/murder act. Alone, Brodie must deal with them both before becoming their next victim. Later, Paul Jenks shows up asking Savannah about LaSalle; "I need to get a message to his boss.... You'll do." The episode ends as Paul aims a gun at Savannah.
22	22	"How Much Pain Can You Take?"	Terrence O'Hara	Christopher Ambrose & Christopher Silber	May 5, 2015	NO122	13.35
In the aftermath of Savannah's murder and with the crime scene later being attacked resulting in the deaths of two officers and four more injured (as well as Brody who suffers a cut to her right arm), the team go into overdrive as all of New Orleans’ law enforcement searches for Baitfish. LaSalle seeks revenge for Savannah's death at Baitfish's hand. However, things get complicated when it is revealed Sasha and Baitfish have turned on each other and both are trying to get rid of the other.
23	23	"My City"	James Hayman	Teleplay by : Jeffrey Lieber; Story by : Jeffrey Lieber & Zach Strauss	May 12, 2015	NO123	13.61
Following a murder at the port in which a Navy officer dies after having his throat slit, Pride and the team investigate and discover that a dangerous West African terrorist has secretly infiltrated the city and is plotting an attack that could leave the entire population gravely ill with radiation poisoning.

== Production ==
=== Development ===
In September 2013, NCIS: New Orleans will be introduced with a two-part backdoor pilot during the eleventh season of NCIS. The episode title "Crescent City (Part I)" and "Crescent City (Part II)", written by Gary Glasberg, which aired on March 25, 2014, to April 1, 2014, a second spin off from NCIS and set filmed located in New Orleans. NCIS: New Orleans was ordered to series on May 9, 2014. On October 27, 2014, CBS picked up NCIS: New Orleans for a full season of 23 episodes.

=== Casting ===
In February 2014, the pilot was cast with Scott Bakula, CCH Pounder, and Zoe McLellan as Dwayne Pride, Loretta Wade, and Meredith Brody, Lucas Black as Christopher LaSalle, and Rob Kerkovich as Sebastian Lund a forensic scientist.

== Broadcast ==
Season one of NCIS: New Orleans premiered on CBS in the United States on Tuesday, September 23, 2014, with the season twelfth premiere of NCIS as its lead-in.

== Reception ==
=== Ratings ===
Viewership and ratings per episode of NCIS: New Orleans season 1
No.	Title	Air date	Rating/share (18–49)	Viewers (millions)	DVR (18–49)	DVR viewers (millions)	Total (18–49)	Total viewers (millions)
1	"Musician Heal Thyself"	September 23, 2014	2.5/7	17.22	1.0	3.71	3.5	20.93
2	"Carrier"	September 30, 2014	2.3/7	16.57	—N/a	3.22	—N/a	19.79
3	"Breaking Brig"	October 7, 2014	2.3/7	15.41	—N/a	3.09	—N/a	18.50
4	"The Recruits"	October 14, 2014	2.2/6	16.14	—N/a	3.06	—N/a	19.20
5	"It Happened Last Night"	October 21, 2014	2.4/7	16.13	0.9	3.27	3.3	19.40
6	"Master of Horror"	October 28, 2014	2.3/7	16.09	—N/a	3.17	—N/a	19.26
7	"Watch Over Me"	November 11, 2014	2.0/6	14.99	—N/a	3.42	—N/a	18.41
8	"Love Hurts"	November 18, 2014	2.3/6	16.86	—N/a	3.01	—N/a	19.87
9	"Chasing Ghosts"	November 25, 2014	2.3/7	14.47	0.8	3.21	3.1	17.68
10	"Stolen Valor"	December 16, 2014	1.9/5	14.14	0.8	3.14	2.7	17.28
11	"Baitfish"	January 6, 2015	2.5/7	17.73	0.9	3.13	3.4	20.86
12	"The Abyss"	January 13, 2015	2.3/7	16.39	—N/a	3.06	—N/a	19.45
13	"The Walking Dead"	February 3, 2015	2.2/7	16.52	—N/a	3.15	—N/a	19.67
14	"Careful What You Wish For"	February 10, 2015	2.3/7	16.19	—N/a	3.42	—N/a	19.61
15	"Le Carnivale de la Mort"	February 17, 2015	2.0/6	14.70	—N/a	3.24	—N/a	17.94
16	"My Brother's Keeper"	February 24, 2015	1.9/6	13.71	—N/a	3.14	—N/a	16.85
17	"More Now"	March 10, 2015	1.6/5	12.61	0.8	2.96	2.4	15.57
18	"The List"	March 24, 2015	1.8/6	14.42	—N/a	3.14	—N/a	17.56
19	"The Insider"	April 7, 2015	1.7/5	14.33	—N/a	2.96	—N/a	17.29
20	"Rock-a-Bye-Baby"	April 14, 2015	1.8/6	14.40	0.8	2.79	2.6	17.19
21	"You'll Do"	April 28, 2015	1.9/6	14.55	—N/a	2.88	—N/a	17.43
22	"How Much Pain Can You Take"	May 5, 2015	1.6/5	13.35	—N/a	3.00	—N/a	16.35
23	"My City"	May 12, 2015	1.7/5	13.61	—N/a	2.99	—N/a	16.60

=== Critical reception ===
NCIS: New Orleans has received mixed reviews from critics. Review aggregator Rotten Tomatoes gives the first season of the show a rating of 60%, based on 30 reviews, with an average rating of 5.50/10. The site's consensus reads, "With a solid cast in a beautiful locale, NCIS: New Orleans makes extending this well-worn franchise look like the Big Easy." Metacritic gives the show a score of 55 out of 100, based on 15 critics, indicating "mixed or average" reviews.

In late September 2014, The Wrap's journalist Jason Hughes reviewed the pilot episode of the series, praising the music, the use of the city of New Orleans, and CBS' decision to cast Scott Bakula as "one of the most likable leading men in television, so they're set there." David Hinckley of the New York Daily News gave a mixed but critical review of the pilot episode, saying there is a "Crescent City flavor here. But in the larger picture, not much on this menu is unfamiliar." Liz Shannon Miller and Ben Travers of Indiewire said that NCIS is like "the obelisk in 2001: A Space Odyssey, it's an awe-inspiring, inescapable presence in the broadcast line-up. NCIS on CBS: It is here. It has always been here. It forever will be."
