= NCIS: New Orleans season 7 =

Season of television series

NCIS: New Orleans
- Season 7
- Showrunners: Jan Nash; Christopher Silber
- Starring: Scott Bakula; Vanessa Ferlito; Necar Zadegan; Charles Michael Davis; Rob Kerkovich; Daryl Mitchell; C. C. H. Pounder; Chelsea Field
- No. of episodes: 16

Release
- Original network: CBS
- Original release: November 8, 2020 – May 23, 2021

Season chronology
- ← Previous; Season 6

The seventh and final season of NCIS: New Orleans an American police procedural drama television series, began airing on CBS on November 8, 2020. The season is produced by CBS Studios, with Christopher Silber and Jan Nash as showrunner and executive producer.

== Cast and characters ==
=== Main ===
- Scott Bakula as Dwayne Cassius Pride, NCIS Southeast Field Office Supervisory Special Agent (SSA) and Team Leader
- Vanessa Ferlito as Tammy Gregorio, NCIS Special Agent
- Necar Zadegan as Hannah Khoury, NCIS Senior Agent, Pride's second in command
- Charles Michael Davis as Quentin Carter, NCIS Special Agent
- Rob Kerkovich as Sebastian Lund, NCIS Forensic Agent
- Daryl "Chill" Mitchell as Patton Plame, NCIS Computer Specialist
- CCH Pounder as Loretta Wade, Jefferson Parish Medical Examiner
- Chelsea Field as Rita Devereaux, a United States Attorney based in Washington, D.C. who is Pride's fiancée

=== Recurring ===
- Nidra Sous la Terre as Lydia Scarborough, NCIS Deputy Director
- Jason Alan Carvell as Jimmy Boyd, Dwayne's younger, previously unknown half-brother
- Amanda Warren as Zahra Taylor, Mayor of New Orleans
- Larry Mitchell as Donovan Blakely, NOPD Detective
- Tyler Weaks as Lenny Yates, NOPD Officer
- Callie Thorne as Sasha Broussard, former member of the Broussard crime family old nemesis and lover of Dwayne
- Drew Scheid as Connor Davenport, son of Sasha Broussard and Dwayne Pride
- Shanley Caswell as Laurel Pride, Dwayne's daughter by his ex-wife, Linda Pride.

=== Guest ===
- Erica Gimpel as Lynette Carter
- Maximiliano Hernández as Master-at-Arms Ted Yancy
- Justin Mortelliti as Sam Wilkes

== Episodes ==
No. overall	No. in season	Title	Directed by	Written by	Original release date	Prod. code	U.S. viewers (millions)
140	1	"Something in the Air"	James Whitmore Jr.	Jan Nash & Christopher Silber	November 8, 2020	NO701	4.65
141	2	"Something in the Air"	James Whitmore Jr.	Jan Nash & Christopher Silber	November 15, 2020	NO702	4.71
Part I: Set a few weeks after Mardi Gras, New Orleans struggles with the effects of COVID-19 as the pandemic begins to spread mercilessly throughout the world. Pride, dealing with the ramifications of the statewide order to close all restaurants and bars, sends Gregorio and Carter to investigate a suspicious death aboard a humanitarian ship offshore, but while on board they learn that some of the crew members are infected with the deadly disease. Meanwhile, Wade is overwhelmed by the high volume in the morgue due to COVID-19, and Khoury struggles to reunite with her daughter, who is with her separated father in Europe, due to the worldwide outbreak. Part II: Carter and Gregorio survive a fiery explosion aboard a COVID-19 infested ship searching for evidence of a suspicious death. Meanwhile, Pride reunites with Rita who reveals some shocking news. Wade helps a woman find her brother's body after he dies from COVID-19. Patton and his goddaughter get into a heated argument about her future after high school.
142	3	"One of Our Own"	Hart Bochner	Ron McGee	November 22, 2020	NO703	4.90
Pride and his team investigate the murder of a fellow New Orleans police officer. Pride soon discovers that the victim was being investigated for using excessive force while on the job. Gregorio begins to feel the effects when she begins a new relationship.
143	4	"We All Fall..."	Hart Bochner	Talicia Raggs	December 13, 2020	NO704	5.17
The NCIS team continue their investigation into the murder of an officer who was about to blow the whistle on police misconduct within NOPD. After he and Rita are swatted by one of the subjects of the investigation, Pride is forced to get creative to finally get rid of the dirty cops, while simultaneously reflecting on his own misconduct in the past. Meanwhile, as COVID-19 continues to overwhelm the system, Wade finally addresses the toll it's taken on her.
144	5	"Operation Drano"	LeVar Burton	Chad Gomez Creasey	January 3, 2021	NO705	4.54
145	6	"Operation Drano"	LeVar Burton	Katherine Beattie	January 10, 2021	NO706	4.67
Part I: Pride and his team investigate the death of a person who held the key to a top-secret high-tech battery. Rita gets assigned to a civil lawsuit case involving someone who was wrongly fired. Part II: Pride and his team continue to investigate a mysterious torpedo from a submarine that terrorizes the people of the Gulf Coast. Meanwhile, with Gregorio's relationship with her girlfriend growing stronger, Sebastian fears that she might move out.
146	7	"Leda and the Swan"	Diana C. Valentine	Stephanie Sengupta	January 17, 2021	NO707	5.07
147	8	"Leda and the Swan"	Diana C. Valentine	Sydney Mitchel	February 14, 2021	NO708	5.00
Part I: When a marine psychologist is found dead in an alleyway, the team discovers the cause is something bigger than the victim's counseling session. Sebastian is helping a witness to get back on her feet after he finds out she's homeless and her child is in protective custody. Part II: As Pride and the team continue the investigation of an officer's assault and the murder of her therapist, NCIS zeros in on a prime suspect who's been working the system for years. Carter and his mother talk about how they'll move forward after a past mistake, and Sebastian begins a promising new relationship.
148	9	"Into Thin Air"	Tim Andrew	Cameron Dupuy	February 21, 2021	NO709	4.93
Pride and the team are on the hunt for a kidnapped 14-year-old girl and discover that her father, who'll soon have custody of her, is a radical survivalist living off the grid.
149	10	"Homeward Bound"	Hart Bochner	Katherine Beattie & Jack Maron	February 28, 2021	NO710	5.03
When a petty officer is shot down by a sniper, Pride and NCIS hunt down the killer, only to find that he may not be acting alone. Rita tells Pride that she's been offered a compelling job in Kansas City.
150	11	"Stashed"	Sherman Shelton, Jr.	Talicia Riggs & Adam Lazarre-White	March 28, 2021	NO711	4.86
Sebastian's life is in danger when a criminal he put behind bars escapes police custody. Carter is tasked with keeping Sebastian in protective custody, and Carter and Hannah's flirtation is fun gossip fodder for Gregorio and Sebastian.
151	12	"Once Upon a Time"	Rob Greenlea	Jan Nash & Ron McGee	April 4, 2021	NO712	4.63
After a Molotov cocktail is hurled at Pride's bar, evidence leads to his old nemesis Sasha Broussard (Callie Thorne) who's been keeping a secret that will affect his life forever. Gregorio uses her profiling skills on Hannah and Carter with shocking accuracy.
152	13	"Choices"	Lionel Coleman	Chad Gomez Creasey & Christopher Silber	May 2, 2021	NO713	4.79
The team investigates the deadly bar bombing and impending criminal turf war involving Sasha Broussard. While Pride must come to terms with having Connor in his life, Carter and Hannah work to define their new relationship.
153	14	"Illusions"	Rob Greenlea	Stephanie Sengupta & Megan Bacharach	May 9, 2021	NO714	4.96
As Pride directs the team to link Sasha to the recent attacks in New Orleans, he must help Connor come to terms with who his mother really is. Carter and Gregorio search for a stolen highly trained military dog. Also, Pride and Rita make an important decision about their wedding.
154	15	"Runs in the Family"	Mary Lou Belli	Ron McGee & Stephanie Sengupta	May 16, 2021	NO715	4.98
As Pride and Rita plan their wedding, the FBI arrests Connor (Drew Scheid) in connection with the bar's firebombing as a means of getting to his mother, Sasha Broussard (Callie Thorne), and Rita may be the only person who can save them. Gregorio moves out of Sebastian's house.
155	16	"Laissez Les Bons Temps Rouler"	Tim Andrew	Chad Gomez Creasey & Ron McGee & Stephanie Sengupta	May 23, 2021	NO716	5.18
On the eve of Pride's wedding to Rita and Connor entering witness protection, Pride must find who attacked Jimmy (Jason Alan Carvell) and Connor (Drew Scheid) while also figuring out Sasha's (Callie Thorne) ulterior motives regarding their son.

== Production ==
=== Development ===
On May 6, 2020, NCIS: New Orleans was renewed for the seventh season. The season consisted of 16 episodes. On February 17, 2021, it was announced that season seven would serve as the series' final season. The series concluded on May 23, 2021.

=== Casting ===
It was announced on September 29, 2020, that Chelsea Field who had been recurring as Rita Deveraux had been promoted to series regular.

=== Filming ===
Production for the seventh season began on September 21, 2020 with full safety protocols in place amid the COVID-19 pandemic. Filming concluded on March 13, 2021.

== Reception ==
=== Ratings ===
Viewership and ratings per episode of NCIS: New Orleans season 7
No.	Title	Air date	Rating (18–49)	Viewers (millions)	DVR (18–49)	DVR viewers (millions)	Total (18–49)	Total viewers (millions)
1	"Something in the Air, Part I"	November 8, 2020	0.6	4.65	0.3	2.56	0.9	7.22
2	"Something in the Air, Part II"	November 15, 2020	0.4	4.71	0.3	1.99	0.7	6.70
3	"One of Our Own"	November 22, 2020	0.5	4.90	—N/a	—N/a	—N/a	—N/a
4	"We All Fall..."	December 13, 2020	0.5	5.17	0.3	2.13	0.8	7.30
5	"Operation Drano, Part I"	January 3, 2021	0.5	4.54	0.3	2.13	0.8	6.67
6	"Operation Drano, Part II"	January 10, 2021	0.5	4.67	0.3	2.41	0.8	7.08
7	"Leda and the Swan, Part I"	January 17, 2021	0.5	5.07	0.3	2.22	0.8	7.29
8	"Leda and the Swan, Part II"	February 14, 2021	0.6	5.00	0.3	2.62	0.9	7.62
9	"Into Thin Air"	February 21, 2021	0.6	4.93	0.3	2.61	0.9	7.54
10	"Homeward Bound"	February 28, 2021	0.6	5.03	0.3	2.57	0.9	7.60
11	"Stashed"	March 28, 2021	0.6	4.86	0.3	2.25	0.9	7.11
12	"Once Upon a Time"	April 4, 2021	0.5	4.63	0.3	2.37	0.8	7.10
13	"Choices"	May 2, 2021	0.5	4.79	0.3	2.37	0.8	7.16
14	"Illusions"	May 9, 2021	0.5	4.96	0.3	2.25	0.8	7.31
15	"Runs in the Family"	May 16, 2021	0.5	4.98	0.3	2.15	0.8	7.13
16	"Laissez Les Bon Temps Rouler"	May 23, 2021	0.5	5.18	0.2	2.13	0.7	7.31

== Broadcast ==
Seventh season of NCIS: New Orleans which premiered on November 8, 2020.

== Home media ==
NCIS: New Orleans: The Final Season
Set details	Special features	
16 episodes; 5-disc set; Subtitled, NTSC		
DVD release dates
Region 1	Region 2	Region 4
August 31, 2021		
