= The Recruits =

The Recruits may refer to:

- "The Recruits", an episode of NCIS: New Orleans
- "The Recruits", an episode of Arrow

== See also ==
- Recruit
