= James Hayman (disambiguation) =

James Hayman may refer to:

- Jim Hayman (footballer) (James Hayman, 1928-2015), English footballer, see List of Bury F.C. players (1–24 appearances)
- James Hayman (born 1953), American television producer
