= Necar Zadegan =

American actress (born 1982)

- Born: June 20, 1982 (age 44); Heidelberg, West Germany
- Education: University of California, Santa Barbara
- Occupations: Actress, model
- Years active: 2005–present
- Notable credit(s): 24; CIA; Girlfriends' Guide to Divorce; NCIS: New Orleans; Elena Undone

Necar Zadegan (Persian: نکار زادگان /nɪˈkɑːr ˈzædɪɡæn/; born June 20, 1982) is an American actress. Zadegan made her Broadway debut alongside Robin Williams in the Pulitzer Prize–nominated production Bengal Tiger at the Baghdad Zoo in 2011. She is known for playing First Lady (and then President) Dalia Hassan on the eighth season of 24. She then played the leading roles of Delia Banai on Girlfriends' Guide to Divorce, Special Agent Hannah Khoury on NCIS: New Orleans, and Nikki Reynard on CIA.

== Early life ==
Zadegan was born on June 20, 1982, in Heidelberg, West Germany, and raised in the San Francisco Bay Area. She is of Iranian heritage.

Zadegan graduated with honors from the University of California, Santa Barbara (UCSB) with a BA degree in Literature. She spent a semester abroad at the Sorbonne University. She speaks Persian, French, English, and German fluently.

== Career ==
From 2005 to 2009, Zadegan had roles in such television series as The Bernie Mac Show, Nip/Tuck, NCIS: Naval Criminal Investigative Service, The Unit, How I Met Your Mother, Big Shots, Lost, The Shield, and CSI: Miami.

In 2009, Zadegan appeared in the Persian language stage production of From Satellite with Love "Az Mahvareh Ta Eshgh", touring in the U.S. and Europe.

In 2009, Zadegan played 'The Leper' in Rajiv Joseph's Bengal Tiger at the Baghdad Zoo, which moved to Broadway in 2011. That same year, she portrayed the First Lady turned president, Dalia Hassan, in the FOX series 24.

Zadegan appeared in the 2010 film Elena Undone in the title role of Elena Winters for FilmMcQueen. That same year she also appeared opposite Michael Sheen and Samuel L. Jackson in the role of Jehan Younger in the Columbia TriStar psychological thriller Unthinkable.

Zadegan returned to television as resident villainess Isabel on the NBC series The Event. She then took on the series regular role of Dr. Gina Bandari on the 2012 series Emily Owens M.D. She appeared as Scarlet Leon, the female lead, opposite Greg Kinnear in the 2014 American version of the comedy Rake.

Later in 2014 she rounded out the all female-lead cast for Bravo's first scripted series Girlfriends' Guide to Divorce in the role of Delia Banai. The show went on to be the first ever to get a three-season pickup and ran for five seasons before premiering its final season in Spring 2018.

In 2015, Zadegan continued to appear in other television series such as Extant, Legends and as the Queen of Iran opposite Michael Sheen for Showtime's critical success Masters of Sex.

Zadegan joined the cast of NCIS: New Orleans in October 2018 playing the role of Special Agent Hannah Khoury, the senior agent in the NCIS New Orleans office.

Zadegan played the role of Ra-Sharir in the first two episodes of season 3 of Documentary Now! for IFC in 2019.

She voices the character of Viola in the 2019 virtual reality sci-fi feature film Eleven Eleven, written by Australian screenwriter Lucas Taylor.

== Filmography ==
Film
Year	Title	Role	Notes
2007	The Touch	Kerime	Short film
2007	You Don't Mess with the Zohan		Scenes deleted
2008	In Another Life	Mira	Short film
2008	Crossroads	Shada	
2010	Unthinkable	Jehan Younger	
2010	When the Voices Fade	Nadia	Short film
2010	Elena Undone	Elena	
2010	The Deal	TBA	Short film
2011	Joshua Tree	Angelina	
2011	Fit to be Tied	Vanessa	Short film
2011	Meth Head	Maia	
2019	Eleven Eleven	Viola (voice)	Sci-fi VR film
2022	Dear Albert	Simone	
2023	Warriors of Stone	Lila	
2024	Cosmetic Criminals	Carolyn (Mom)	Video
2025	Inheritance	Erika Papp	
2025	The Electric State	Farah Bedi	
2026	Misty Green	Shabnam	
TBA	Blind Owl	Medicine Woman	

Television
Year	Title	Role	Notes
2005	The Bernie Mac Show	Sales associate	1 episode
2006	Nip/Tuck	Nastran	1 episode
2007	NCIS	Lt. Rihama Shaheen (uncredited)	1 episode
2007	The Unit	Pari	1 episode
2007	How I Met Your Mother	Girl #2	1 episode ("Moving Day")
2007	Big Shots	Prostitute	Pilot episode
2008	Lost	Translator	1 episode ("Confirmed Dead")
2008	The Shield	Dr. Lucine	1 episode
2009	Floored and Lifted	Caroline	2 episodes
2010	CSI: Miami	Salumeh Farooq	1 episode
2010	24	Dalia Hassan	Recurring role, 20 episodes
2010	Outlaw	Patty Friedman	2 episodes
2010	Undercovers	Zarina Yasi	1 episode (never aired in the U.S.; aired in Australia)
2010–11	The Event	Isabel	5 episodes
2011	A Gifted Man	Madeline Fahn	1 episode
2012	Harry's Law	Sarita Radan	1 episode
2012	Major Crimes	Roma Strauss	1 episode ("The Ecstasy and the Agony")
2012–13	Emily Owens, M.D.	Gina Bandhari	Main role
2013	The Fosters	Gretchen	1 episode ("Clean")
2014	Rake	Scarlet Leon	Main role
2014	Legends	Ana Paulanos	2 episodes
2014–2018	Girlfriends' Guide to Divorce	Delia Banai	Main role
2014–2015	Extant	Shayna Velez	6 episodes
2015	Archer	Yasmin Fawaz	1 episode
2015	Masters of Sex	Queen of Iran	1 episode ("Three's a Crowd")
2018–2019	The Good Doctor	Dr. Ko	3 episodes
2018	Here and Now	Layla Shokrani	Main Role
2018–2021	NCIS: New Orleans	Special Agent Hannah Khoury	Main role (Seasons 5–7)
2019	Documentary Now!	Ra-Sharir	2 episodes
2020	Star Trek: Picard	Bjayzl	1 episode
2021–2025	Mayor of Kingstown	Assistant D.A. Evelyn Foley	27 episodes
2025–present	The Rookie	ADA Vivian Eckert	6 episodes
2025	Law & Order	Defense Attorney Bonnie Kimura	Episode: "Parasite"
2026–present	CIA	Nikki Reynard	Main role
2026	FBI	Nikki Reynard	1 episode
TBA	Joseph of Egypt	Zilapah	
TBA	All the World	Ana	

=== Video games ===
Year	Title	Role	Notes
2014	The Elder Scrolls Online	Additional voices	
2017	Horizon Zero Dawn: The Frozen Wilds	Ourea	Voice, DLC for the original game
2019	Jumanji: The Video Game	Ruby Roundhouse (German)	Voice
2023	The Elder Scrolls Online: Necrom		
2023	Diablo IV	Additional voices	
2024	The Elder Scrolls Online: Gold Road	Voice	
2024	Indiana Jones and the Great Circle	Nawal Shafiq-Barclay	

== See also ==
- List of Iranian actresses
