= NCIS: New Orleans =

American crime drama television series (2014–2021)

- Genre: Procedural drama; Crime drama
- Created by: Gary Glasberg
- Based on: NCIS by: Donald P. Bellisario; Don McGill
- Showrunners: Jeffrey Lieber; Gary Glasberg; Brad Kern; Christopher Silber; Jan Nash
- Starring: Scott Bakula; Lucas Black; Zoe McLellan; Rob Kerkovich; CCH Pounder; Daryl "Chill" Mitchell; Shalita Grant; Vanessa Ferlito; Necar Zadegan; Charles Michael Davis; Chelsea Field
- Theme music composer: John Lee Hooker
- Opening theme: "Boom Boom" performed by Big Head Todd and the Monsters
- Composers: Brian Kirk; Tree Adams
- Country of origin: United States
- Original language: English
- No. of seasons: 7
- No. of episodes: 155 (list of episodes)

Production
- Executive producers: James Hayman; Jeffrey Lieber; Gary Glasberg; Mark Harmon; Christopher Silber; Brad Kern; Chad Gomez Creasey; Adam Targum; Scott Bakula; Jan Nash; Ron McGee; Stephanie Sengupta
- Producers: David Appelbaum; Joshua Rexon; Joseph Zolfo; Scott Bakula; Talicia Raggs; Randy Sutter; Greta Heinemann; Katherine Beattie
- Cinematography: Gordon C. Lonsdale; Rohn Schmidt
- Camera setup: Multi-camera
- Running time: 40–42 minutes
- Production companies: Wings Productions (Note: Episode end credits); When Pigs Fly Incorporated (seasons 1–4); CBS Studios (Note: Credited as CBS Television Studios (seasons 1–6))

Original release
- Network: CBS
- Release: September 23, 2014 – May 23, 2021

Related
- Hawaii Five-0; NCIS; NCIS: Los Angeles; NCIS: Hawaiʻi; NCIS: Sydney; NCIS: Origins; NCIS: Tony & Ziva; NCIS: New York

NCIS: New Orleans is an American action crime drama and police procedural television series that premiered on CBS on September 23, 2014, following the twelfth season of NCIS. The pilot was written by Gary Glasberg, produced by CBS Studios, Wings Productions and, for the first four seasons, When Pigs Fly Incorporated. The series, set and filmed in New Orleans, is the third series of the NCIS franchise. In May 2020, the show was renewed for the seventh season which ended being the last and it premiered on November 8, 2020. In February 2021, CBS announced that the seventh season would be the series' final one. The series concluded on May 23, 2021, making it the first show in the NCIS franchise to come to an end.

== Premise ==
NCIS: New Orleans follows a fictional team of Naval Criminal Investigative Service (NCIS) Special Agents stationed out of New Orleans, Louisiana and led by Supervisory Special Agent Dwayne Cassius Pride (Scott Bakula). The team focuses on crimes that involve personnel in the United States Navy and Marine Corps, and their territory ranges from the Mississippi River to the Texas Panhandle.

== Cast and characters ==
- Scott Bakula as Dwayne "King" Cassius Pride, NCIS Supervisory Special Agent / Special Agent in Charge of the New Orleans office.
- Lucas Black as Christopher LaSalle, NCIS Senior Field Agent (seasons 1–6)
- Zoe McLellan as Meredith Brody, NCIS Special Agent (seasons 1–2)
- Rob Kerkovich as Sebastian Lund, the team's forensic scientist turned Forensics Agent
- CCH Pounder as Loretta Wade, Medical Examiner
- Shalita Grant as Sonja Percy, ATF special agent turned NCIS Special Agent (recurring season 1; main seasons 2–4)
- Daryl "Chill" Mitchell as Patton Plame, also known as Triple P, the teams Cyber Specialist (recurring season 1; main seasons 2–7)
- Vanessa Ferlito as Tammy Gregorio, FBI special agent from Washington, D.C. turned NCIS Special Agent. She replaces Brody after Brody’s departure (seasons 3–7)
- Necar Zadegan as Hannah Khoury, Special Agent in Charge, later Senior Field Agent and Second in Command of the NOLA Office. She replaces Percy after Percy’s departure (seasons 5–7)
- Charles Michael Davis as Quentin Carter, NCIS Special Agent. He replaces LaSalle after LaSalle’s death (seasons 6–7)
- Chelsea Field as Rita Deveraux, JAG Commander in the United States Navy Reserve (recurring season 3–6; main season 7)

== Episodes ==
Season	Episodes	Originally released	
Season	Episodes	First released	Last released
Intro	2	March 25, 2014	April 1, 2014
1	23	September 23, 2014	May 12, 2015
2	24	September 22, 2015	May 17, 2016
3	24	September 20, 2016	May 16, 2017
4	24	September 26, 2017	May 15, 2018
5	24	September 25, 2018	May 14, 2019
6	20	September 24, 2019	April 19, 2020
7	16	November 8, 2020	May 23, 2021

== Production ==
=== Development ===
NCIS: Los Angeles originally had a proposed spin-off series commissioned by CBS during the 2012-13 TV season titled NCIS: Red. Written and produced by Shane Brennan, the series would follow "a mobile team of agents who live and work together as they go across the country to solve crimes". On February 6, 2013, John Corbett was cast as retired special agent Roy, the series male lead. Earlier, Miguel Ferrer would join the cast as a series regular, and reprising his NCIS: Los Angeles role, Edwin Hodge had been cast as Kai, an intelligence analyst, Scott Grimes was cast as Dave, Gillian Alexy was cast as Claire, and Kim Raver was cast in the pilot, playing the lead role of Paris. The pilot episode, titled "Red" and "Red-2", aired on March 19 and 26, 2013, during the fourth season of NCIS: Los Angeles. On May 15, 2013, CBS announced that the pilot would not be taken to series. On May 21, 2013, CBS President Nina Tassler stated that "sometimes [spinoffs] work and sometimes they don't. Protecting [the franchise] was really important."

In September 2013, it was reported that a second NCIS spin-off series set in New Orleans would be introduced with a two-part backdoor pilot during the eleventh season of NCIS. The episode title "Crescent City (Part I)" and "Crescent City (Part II)", written by Gary Glasberg, were filmed in New Orleans in February 2014, and aired on March 25, 2014, to April 1, 2014. The series, titled NCIS: New Orleans, was picked up to series on May 9, 2014, NCIS: New Orleans premiered on September 23, 2014, on CBS. On October 27, 2014, CBS picked up NCIS: New Orleans for a full season of 23 episodes.

On January 12, 2015, NCIS: New Orleans was renewed for a second season, that premiered on September 22, 2015. NCIS: New Orleans was renewed for a third season on March 25, 2016, which premiered on September 20, 2016. The third season was the last season produced by the NCIS: New Orleans creator and showrunner Gary Glasberg before he died on September 28, 2016. NCIS: New Orleans was renewed for a fourth season on March 23, 2017, which premiered on September 26, 2017. NCIS: New Orleans was renewed for a fifth season on April 18, 2018, which premiered on September 25, 2018. NCIS: New Orleans was renewed for a sixth season on April 22, 2019, which premiered on September 24, 2019. On May 6, 2020, NCIS: New Orleans was renewed for the seventh season, which premiered on November 8, 2020. On February 17, 2021, it was announced that the seventh season would be the show's last, with the finale airing on May 23, 2021.

=== Casting ===
In February 2014, the pilot was cast with Scott Bakula, CCH Pounder, and Zoe McLellan as Dwayne Pride, Loretta Wade and Meredith Brody. Lucas Black as Christopher LaSalle, and Rob Kerkovich joined cast as Sebastian Lund. In June 2015, Deadline Hollywood reported that Daryl Mitchell and Shalita Grant promoted as regulars in season two.

In July 2016, Zoe McLellan, who plays Special Agent Meredith Brody, left the series "for creative reasons", and Vanessa Ferlito joined the cast as Special Agent Tammy Gregorio as a series regular.

In January 2018, it was announced that Shalita Grant, who plays Special Agent Sonja Percy, would be departing the series near the end of the fourth season. In August 2018, it was announced that Necar Zadegan would join the cast as Special Agent Hannah Khoury as a new series regular for the fifth season.

In 2018, Jason Alan Carvell was cast as James Edwin "Jimmy" Boyd who is the paternal half-brother of NCIS Special Agent Dwayne Pride. He reprised his role from time to time until the show's finale in 2021.

In November 2019, Lucas Black, who portrayed Agent Christopher LaSalle, announced he would be departing in the sixth episode of the sixth season. On February 5, 2020, it was announced that Charles Michael Davis had been cast as Quentin Carter, and would appear as a series regular. On September 29, 2020, it was announced that Chelsea Field portraying attorney Rita Devereaux would be a series regular for the seventh season after recurring for the previous four seasons.

=== Controversy ===
Brad Kern took over the reins of NCIS: New Orleans as showrunner in January 2016. Within a year he had become the focus of two investigations for inappropriate behavior toward women. On May 17, 2018, it was reported that Kern was exiting his role as executive producer and showrunner, but would remain as consulting producer, with Christopher Silber replacing him as showrunner. Kern was placed on suspension in June 2018, when CBS launched a third investigation into claims of harassment. Kern was fired by CBS in October 2018.

== Broadcast ==
NCIS: New Orleans premiered on CBS in the United States on Tuesday, September 23, 2014, with the twelfth season premiere of NCIS as its lead-in. Season two premiered on September 22, 2015. Season three premiered on September 20, 2016. Season four premiered on September 26, 2017. Season five premiered on September 25, 2018. Season six premiered on September 24, 2019. NCIS: New Orleans aired simultaneously on Global in Canada. In Australia, NCIS: New Orleans premiered on Network Ten on October 7, 2014. NCIS: New Orleans was initially sold to Channel 5 in the United Kingdom, where it premiered on February 13, 2015, and aired for four seasons, before moving to Fox UK beginning July 20, 2018. NCIS: New Orleans has aired on Prime in New Zealand, on AXN in India and Latin America and on Fox in Southeast Asia. On April 2, 2015, the series began airing on South Africa's M-Net cable TV service and was also broadcast to several other sub-Saharan African nations via DStv.

=== Syndication ===
In August 2015, NCIS: New Orleans began airing on TVOne Pakistan.

In December 2017, reruns of NCIS: New Orleans began airing on TNT until September 2025.

In January 2021, reruns of NCIS: New Orleans began airing on Ion Television.

== Reception ==
=== Ratings ===
Viewership and ratings per season of NCIS: New Orleans
Season	Timeslot (ET)	Episodes	First aired		Last aired		TV season	Viewership rank	Avg. viewers (millions)
Season	Timeslot (ET)	Episodes	Date	Viewers (millions)	Date	Viewers (millions)	TV season	Viewership rank	Avg. viewers (millions)
1	Tuesday 9:00 p.m.	23	September 23, 2014	17.22	May 12, 2015	13.61	2014–15	4	17.42
2	Tuesday 9:00 p.m.	24	September 22, 2015	12.62	May 17, 2016	13.30	2015–16	6	14.75
3	Tuesday 10:00 p.m.	24	September 20, 2016	11.12	May 16, 2017	9.22	2016–17	10	13.34
4	Tuesday 10:00 p.m.	24	September 26, 2017	8.78	May 15, 2018	9.44	2017–18	13	12.22
5	Tuesday 10:00 p.m.	24	September 25, 2018	8.97	May 14, 2019	6.93	2018–19	22	10.56
6	Tuesday 10:00 p.m. (2019); Sunday 10:00 p.m. (2020)	20	September 24, 2019	6.66	April 19, 2020	6.24	2019–20	20	9.58
7	Sunday 9:00 p.m. (1–7); Sunday 10:00 p.m. (8–16)	16	November 8, 2020	4.65	May 23, 2021	5.18	2020–21	27	7.22

=== Critical reception ===
NCIS: New Orleans has received mixed reviews from critics. Review aggregator Rotten Tomatoes gives the first season of the show a rating of 60%, based on 30 reviews, with an average rating of 5.50/10. The site's consensus reads, "With a solid cast in a beautiful locale, NCIS: New Orleans makes extending this well-worn franchise look like the Big Easy." Metacritic gives the show a score of 55 out of 100, based on 19 critics, indicating "mixed or average reviews". IMDb gives a score of 6.8/10 based on 20,000 notes.

In late September 2014, TheWrap journalist Jason Hughes reviewed the pilot episode of the series, praising the music, the use of the city of New Orleans, and CBS' decision to cast Scott Bakula as "one of the most likable leading men in television, so they're set there."

David Hinckley of the New York Daily News gave a mixed but critical review of the pilot episode, saying there is a "Crescent City flavor here. But in the larger picture, not much on this menu is unfamiliar." Liz Shannon Miller and Ben Travers of Indiewire said that NCIS is like "the obelisk in 2001: A Space Odyssey, it's an awe-inspiring, inescapable presence in the broadcast line-up. NCIS on CBS: It is here. It has always been here. It forever will be."

=== International criticism ===
In April 2019, CBS released the plot of the first part of the show's fifth season's finale, "The River Styx, Part I", which is set to partially take place in the breakaway republic of South Ossetia, a region internationally recognized as part of Georgia but also recognized as independent by Russia, Nauru, Nicaragua, Venezuela, and Syria. The show, when describing the region, calls South Ossetia a "war-torn Russian province", which raised concerns from the Georgian government. On April 22, 2019, Georgian President Salome Zourabichvili posted on Twitter.

An upcoming episode of @NCISNewOrleans set to feature #Georgia's 'South Ossetia' as a "Russian province" is troubling. This synopsis mistake is irresponsible and we call on @CBS and the show's writers to respect Georgia's territorial integrity and make the necessary changes.

Neither CBS nor the show's producers have responded to the President's commentary. However, the description of the second part of the finale, "The River Styx, Part II" does not mention Russia, although the episode still takes place in South Ossetia.

== Awards and nominations ==
Year	Association	Category	Nominee(s)	Result	Ref.
2015	People's Choice Awards	Favorite New TV Drama	NCIS: New Orleans	Nominated	
2015	People's Choice Awards	Favorite Actor in a New TV Series	Scott Bakula	Nominated	
