= Gary Glasberg =

American television writer and producer

- Born: July 15, 1966; New York City, New York
- Died: September 28, 2016 (aged 50); Los Angeles, California
- Occupations: Television producer and writer
- Spouse: Mimi Schmir
- Children: 2
- Writing career
- Years active: 1990–2016
- Notable works: Crossing Jordan; The Evidence; Bones; Shark; The Mentalist; NCIS; NCIS: New Orleans

Gary Glasberg (July 15, 1966 – September 28, 2016) was an American television writer and producer. He was born in New York City. He was the showrunner on NCIS and creator of NCIS: New Orleans.

Glasberg's production company is called When Pigs Fly Incorporated.

== Career ==
Glasberg started out writing for animated shows such as Rugrats, Mighty Morphin Power Rangers, Aaahh!!! Real Monsters and Duckman. Glasberg's credits include The Street, Crossing Jordan, The Evidence, Bones, Shark, The Mentalist and NCIS. From 2011 until his death he was showrunner, and the producer in charge of day-to-day operations, on NCIS.

== Screenwriting ==
- Rugrats (1992)
- Mighty Morphin Power Rangers (1993)
- Superhuman Samurai Syber-Squad (1994)
- Aaahh!!! Real Monsters (1994)
- Duckman (1995)
- Swift Justice (1996)
- L.A. Firefighters (1996)
- Viper (1997)
- Recess (1997)
- Ghost Stories (1997–1998)
- L.A. Doctors (1998)
- Mercy Point (1998)
- Good vs. Evil (1999)
- Cover Me (2000)
- The Street (2000)
- Crossing Jordan (2001–2004)
- The Evidence (2006)
- Bones (2006–2007)
- Shark (2007)
- The Mentalist (2008–2009)
- NCIS (2009–2016)
- NCIS: New Orleans (2014)

== Producer ==
- Crossing Jordan (2001–2004)
- The Evidence (2006)
- Bones (2006–2007)
- Shark (2007–2008)
- The Mentalist (2008–2009)
- NCIS (2009–2017)
- NCIS: New Orleans (2014–2018)

== Personal life ==
Glasberg was married to writer Mimi Schmir and had two sons.

Glasberg died in his sleep of unknown causes on September 28, 2016, in Los Angeles at the age of 50.
