= Zoe McLellan =

American actress (born 1974)

- Born: November 6, 1974 (age 51); La Jolla, California, U.S.
- Education: South Kitsap High School
- Occupation: Actress
- Years active: 1994–2019
- Known for: JAG; NCIS: New Orleans; Dirty Sexy Money; Designated Survivor
- Spouse(s): Jean-Pierre Guy Gillain (m. 20??; div. 2016)
- Children: 1

Zoe McLellan (born November 6, 1974) is an American former actress known for roles in JAG, Dirty Sexy Money, NCIS: New Orleans and Designated Survivor.

== Early life and education ==
McLellan was born in La Jolla, California, and raised in Washington. In 1992, she was homecoming queen at South Kitsap High School in Port Orchard, Washington.

== Career ==
In 1995, she began her career on television, appearing over the next five years on episodes of Sliders, Diagnosis: Murder, and Star Trek: Voyager. Her first film appearance as a named character was a minor role in the 1997 film, Inventing the Abbotts.

In 2001, McLellan joined the cast of CBS procedural JAG, in a recurring role as Navy Petty Officer Jennifer Coates. For the final season of the show she was elevated to series regular. After the series ended, McLellan was cast as the wife of Peter Krause's character, in the soapy comedy-drama series Dirty Sexy Money. The series was canceled after two seasons in 2009. McLellan later guest-starred on House and The Mentalist, and also had roles in Lifetime TV movies.

In 2014, she began playing the female leading role, Meredith Brody, in the procedural drama NCIS: New Orleans. In July 2016, it was reported that she would not return for season three, with her lead role character replaced with one played by Vanessa Ferlito.

In 2017, McLellan was cast in a series regular role in the second season of Designated Survivor as White House Counsel Kendra Daynes; she was not brought back for the following season.

== Personal life ==
McLellan was married to actor Jean-Pierre Guy Gillain; they had one child together, a son born c. 2013, before they divorced in 2016.

== Filmography ==
Film performances
Year	Title	Role	Notes
1994	Imaginary Crimes	Edgemont Girl #4	
1995	Mr. Holland's Opus	Girl 4	
1997	Inventing the Abbotts	Sandy	
1999	Stonebrook	Londyn	
2000	Dungeons & Dragons	Marina Pretensa	
2006	Conversations with God	Zoe – waitress	
2008	Person, Place or Thing	Alexis	Short film
2009	Reunion	Averil	
2010	Inside Out	Katherine Taylor	Short film
2011	One Fall	Julie Gardner	
2014	Back to L.A.	Alice	Voice role

Television performances
Year	Title	Role	Notes
1995	Under Suspicion	Martha Swail	Episode: "Holy Suspect"
1995	Medicine Ball		Episode: "Wizard of Bras"
1996	Nowhere Man	Mary	Episode: "Forever Jung"
1996	Sliders	Logan St. Claire	Episode: "Double Cross"
1997	Home Invasion	Gia	TV movie
1997	Silk Stalkings	Marin Kennedy	Episode: "Pink Elephants"
1999	The Wrong Girl	Kelly Garner	TV movie
1999	Diagnosis: Murder	Detective Taylor Lucas	Episode: "Blood Ties"; unsuccessful backdoor pilot
1999	Stranger in My House	Lara Lipski Lewis	TV movie
2000	Star Trek: Voyager	Tal Celes	2 episodes
2000–2001	The Invisible Man	Kate Easton	2 episodes: "The Value of Secrets", "Frozen in Time"
2002	First Monday	Emmie	Episode: "Showdown"
2001–2005	JAG	Petty Officer Jennifer Coates	Recurring role (Season 7–9); Main cast (Season 10)
2005	Bitter Sweet	Elizabeth	TV movie
2007–2009	Dirty Sexy Money	Lisa George	Main cast
2009	House Rules	Julia Rose	TV movie
2010	Deadly Honeymoon	Gwen Merced	TV movie
2010	House	Sidney Merrick / Patient X	Episode: "Baggage"
2010	Royal Pains	Kim the winemaker	Episode: "In Vino Veritas"
2010	The Mentalist	Marie Jarret Bajoran	Episode: "Red Hot"
2010	The Whole Truth	Stephanie Concolino	Episode: "Liars"
2014, 2016	NCIS	Agent Meredith Brody	3 episodes
2014–2016	NCIS: New Orleans	Agent Meredith Brody	Main cast (Seasons 1–2)
2015	Perception	Alice Pierce	Episode: "Brainstorm"
2016–2017	Suits	Holly Cromwell	4 Episodes
2017	Law & Order: Special Victims Unit	Dr. Fran Conway	2 episodes
2017–2018	Designated Survivor	Kendra Daynes	Main cast (Season 2)
2018	Mean Queen	Julie Taylor	TV film
2019	Is My Daughter Really Dead?	Olivia Whitmore	TV film
