= Chelsea Field =

American actress

- Born: Kimberly A. Botfield; May 27, 1957 (age 69); Glendale, California, U.S.
- Occupation: Actress
- Years active: 1984–present
- Spouse: Scott Bakula (m. 2009)
- Children: 2

Chelsea Field (born Kimberly A. Botfield; May 27, 1957) is an American film and television actress.

== Early life ==
Field was born Kimberly A. Botfield in Glendale, California.

== Career ==
Field started her career as a Solid Gold Dancer, and one of her first television roles was on Airwolf. She played Teela in the 1987 film adaptation of Masters of the Universe. She began portraying attorney Rita Devereaux on NCIS: New Orleans during the program's third season. The character was changed from recurring to regular effective with the seventh season.

== Personal life ==
Field married actor Scott Bakula in 2009 after a 15-year relationship during which they had two children.

== Filmography ==
=== Film ===
Chelsea Field film work
| Year | Title | Role | Notes |
|---|---|---|---|
| 1985 | Perfect | Randy | |
| 1985 | Commando | Flight Attendant | |
| 1987 | Masters of the Universe | Teela | |
| 1987 | Prison | Katherine Walker | |
| 1989 | Skin Deep | Amy McKenna | |
| 1989 | Death Spa | Darla | |
| 1991 | Harley Davidson and the Marlboro Man | Virginia Slim | |
| 1991 | The Last Boy Scout | Sarah Hallenbeck | |
| 1992 | Dust Devil | Wendy Robinson | |
| 1993 | The Dark Half | Annie Pangborn | |
| 1993 | Extreme Justice | Kelly Daniels | |
| 1993 | Snapdragon | Det. Sgt. 'Peck' Peckham | |
| 1994 | I'll Do Anything | Screen-Test Actress | |
| 1994 | Andre | Thalice Whitney | |
| 1994 | A Passion to Kill | Diana | |
| 1995 | The Wrong Woman | Margaret | |
| 1996 | Flipper | Cathy | |
| 1998 | Wicked | Karen Christianson | |
| 2001 | The Unsaid | Penny Hunter | |
| 2005 | Sleeping Dogs Lie | Maggie | |
| 2008 | Just Add Water | Jeanne | |

=== Television ===
Chelsea Field television work
| Year | Title | Role | Notes |
|---|---|---|---|
| 1984 | Glitter | Dancer | Episode: "Pilot" |
| 1985 | Airwolf | Brunette | Episode: "Airwolf II" |
| 1987 | CBS Summer Playhouse | Kelsey Baker | Episode: "Barrington" |
| 1988 | A Year in the Life | Karen | Episode: "The Little Disturbance of Man" |
| 1988 | The Bronx Zoo | Chris Barnes | 4 episodes |
| 1988 | Thirtysomething | Emily Burch | Episode: "Undone" |
| 1989 | Nightingales | Samantha 'Sam' Sullivan | Main role; 13 episodes |
| 1989 | Just Temporary | Barbara | TV movie |
| 1990 | Capital News | Cassy Swann | Main role; 13 episodes |
| 1990 | Murder C.O.D. | Ellie | TV movie |
| 1991 | An Inconvenient Woman | Camilla Ebury | TV miniseries |
| 1993 | Hotel Room | Diane | Episode: "Getting Rid of Robert" |
| 1993 | Complex of Fear | Michelle Dolan | TV movie |
| 1993 | Time Trax | Eve Thorn | Episode: "Two Beans in a Wheel" |
| 1993 | Dream On | Allison | Episode: "A Midsummer Night's Dream On" |
| 1993 | Angel Falls | Rae Dawn Snow | Main role |
| 1994 | The Birds II: Land's End | Mary Hocken | TV movie |
| 1994 | Royce | Marnie Paymer | TV movie |
| 1994 | Texas | Mattie | TV miniseries |
| 1994 | Tales from the Crypt | Simone 'Gwen' Bardou | "The Assassin" |
| 1995 | Indictment: The McMartin Trial | Christine Johnson | TV movie |
| 1995 | The Omen | Annalisse Summer | TV movie |
| 1996 | The Bachelor's Baby | Jaimie Fletcher | TV movie |
| 1998 | Legacy | Regine | Episode: "Blood Relative" |
| 1999 | NetForce | Megan Michaels | TV movie |
| 2004 | Cold Case | Nicole Barnes | Episode: "Glued" |
| 2005 | Without a Trace | Deborah Stone | Episode: "Manhunt" |
| 2006 | NCIS | Jocelyn Wayne | "Head Case" |
| 2011 | Borderline Murder | Claire Morgan | TV movie |
| 2011 | Memphis Beat | Megan Hargrove | Episode: "The Things We Carry" |
| 2016 | Secrets and Lies | Janice | Episode: "The Daughter" |
| 2017–2021 | NCIS: New Orleans | Rita Devereaux | Recurring role (season 3–6); Main Cast (season 7) |
