= Michael Zinberg =

American TV director, producer, writer (born 1944)

- Born: Michael Allan Zinberg; March 22, 1944 (age 82); Bexar County, Texas
- Education: University of Texas at Austin
- Occupations: Television Director; TV Producer; TV Writer; Former TV Executive
- Years active: 1971–present
- Spouse: Leslie Zinberg (m. 1969)

Michael Allan Zinberg (born March 22, 1944) is an American television director, producer and writer.

== Early life and education ==
Zinberg was born in Bexar County, Texas to Dorothy (née Rissien) and William Zinberg.

Zinberg graduated from Thomas Jefferson High School in San Antonio, Texas. In 1977, he earned a B.S. in radio-television-film from Moody College of Communication at the University of Texas at Austin.

== Career ==
Zinberg moved to Los Angeles, California, in 1968, with his first job as an usher at CBS Television City. He worked his way up to become a production assistant and then a writer, eventually working as an Associate Producer on the James Garner TV show Nichols.

In 1972, Zinberg joined the MTM Productions television production company that was founded by Mary Tyler Moore's husband, Grant Tinker. While at MTM Productions he wrote, produced and directed The Bob Newhart Show for six seasons, as well as The Mary Tyler Moore Show, among other popular TV shows of the 1970s and 1980s.

From 1979 to 1981, Zinberg was VP Production Development at NBC, where he was responsible for Hill Street Blues and Cheers as well as other programs.

From 1993 to 1995, Zinberg was President of NBC Productions, where he oversaw Homicide: Life on the Street, JAG and all NBC late-night programming.

As of 2023, Zinberg was still producing or directing episodes of TV series, such as directing the April 2023 season 20 episode "Head Games" of the series NCIS – his 23 episode, having started on that series with the November 2003 season 1 episode "Sub Rosa".

== Personal life ==
Zinberg has been married to Leslie S. Fierman Zinberg, a writer and designer, since 1969.

== Filmography ==
Selected work

- 1971–1972: Nichols - Assistant Producer, 24 episodes
- 1972–1974: The Mary Tyler Moore Show - Associate Producer, 24 episodes; Assistant Producer, 24 episodes
- 1972–1978: The Bob Newhart Show - Associate Producer, 75 episodes; Producer, 33 episodes; Executive Producer, 22 episodes; Director, 15 episodes
- 1976–1978: The Tony Randall Show - Director, 5 episodes
- 1982–1983: Taxi - Director, 6 episodes
- 1978–1979: WKRP in Cincinnati - Director, 4 episodes
- 1983–1984: The Yellow Rose - Executive Producer, 22 episodes
- 1987–1988: L.A. Law - Director, 2 episodes
- 1989–1990: Midnight Caller - Director - 3 episodes
- 1990–1991: Quantum Leap - Co-Executive Producer, 24 episodes; Director, 9 episodes
- 1996–1998: JAG - Co-Executive Producer, 7 episodes; Director, 2 episodes
- 1996–1997: Men Behaving Badly - Director, 16 episodes
- 1999–2002: Everybody Loves Raymond - Director, 5 episodes
- 1999–2004: The Practice - Director, 8 episodes
- 2003–2009: Monk - Director, 5 episodes
- 2003–2023: NCIS - Director, 23 episodes
- 2004–2005: Gilmore Girls - Director, 6 episodes
- 2008–2010: Private Practice - Director, 5 episodes
- 2009–2010: Lie to Me - Director, 4 episodes
- 2010–2011: Rizzoli & Isles - Executive Producer, 15 episodes; Director, 5 episodes
- 2010–2016: The Good Wife - Director, 15 episodes
- 2012–2013: 90210 - Director, 4 episodes
- 2013: Franklin & Bash - Director, 1 episode
- 2014: The Michael J. Fox Show - Director, 1 episode
- 2014: Star-Crossed - Director, 1 episode
- 2014: The Blacklist - Director, 2 episodes
- 2014–2016: Agents of S.H.I.E.L.D. - Director, 2 episodes
- 2014–2019: NCIS: New Orleans - Director, 13 episodes
- 2015–2016: The Carmichael Show - Director, 3 episodes
- 2015–2016: Aquarius - Director, 3 episodes
- 2015–2016: Rosewood - Director, 2 episodes
- 2017: Young Sheldon - Director, 2 episodes
- 2017–2018: The Good Fight - Director, 2 episodes
- 2020: Evil - Director, 1 episode

== Honors ==
=== Emmys ===
- 1977: Outstanding Comedy Series, The Bob Newhart Show (CBS)
- 1991: Outstanding Drama Series, Quantum Leap (NBC)
- 1992: Outstanding Drama Series, Quantum Leap (NBC)

Zinberg has won the following awards and has served on the following bodies:

- The Lifetime Achievement Award from The Caucus of Writers, Producers and Directors
- Board Member, The Western Directors Council
- Co-Chair of the DGA Television Creative Rights Committee
- 1983: The Young Texas Exes Award, University of Texas at Austin
- 1994: The College of Communication Outstanding Alumnus Award, University of Texas at Austin
- UT College of Communication Foundation Advisory Council, University of Texas at Austin
