= Mary Lou Belli =

American television director and author

- Occupations: Television director, author
- Years active: 1984–present

Mary Lou Belli is an American television director and author.

== Career ==
Belli attended Penn State where she received a Bachelor's degree. For many years she acted in musical theatre and soap operas in New York City, followed by a Los Angeles career producing and directing theatre with over 75 play productions to her name.

Belli made her television directorial debut on episode of Charles in Charge in 1988. Her other television credits include, Major Dad, USA High, Sister, Sister, One World, The Hughleys, One on One, Abby, Eve, Girlfriends, Monk, Living with Fran, The Game, Reed Between the Lines and Wizards of Waverly Place.

Belli has co-authored of two books: The Sitcom Career Book (2004) with director Phil Ramuno and foreword by actor Henry Winkler and The Sitcom Career Book and Acting for Young Actors (2006) with actress Dinah Lenney and foreword by actor Jason Ritter. She has also been a judge for the Miss America Outstanding Teen Pageant, a lecturer at the Chautauqua Institute, and a panelist for Women in Film, the Directors Guild of America, Screen Actors Guild, and the American Federation of Television and Radio Artists. She has judged the California Independent Film Festival, the Sapporo Short Film Festival in Japan, and CSU Media Arts Fest.

== Awards ==
Among the awards she has won is one from Mayor Tom Bradley for her work with abused children. She has lectured frequently throughout the United States including many universities such as AFI, New York University, Northwestern University, and University of Connecticut.

Belli has received Primetime Emmy Award nominations for Outstanding Directing for a Comedy Series for her work on The Ms. Pat Show in 2022, 2023 and 2024.

== Personal life ==
Belli currently lives in Los Angeles with her husband and two children, who are both actors. She is the aunt of notable drag queen and actor Willam Belli.
