= Rob Kerkovich =

American actor

- Born: Robert Francis Kerkovich; August 11, 1979 (age 47); Springfield, Massachusetts, U.S.
- Occupation: Actor
- Years active: 2004–present
- Height: 6 ft 2 in (188 cm)
- Spouse: Anjali Prasertong
- Children: 2

Robert Francis Kerkovich (born August 11, 1979 in Springfield, Massachusetts) is an American television and film actor, known for his work as the character Forensic Agent Sebastian Lund on the television series NCIS: New Orleans. He has also appeared in films Cloverfield, The Rebound, and Still Waiting.... He now plays in the Glass Cannon Podcast's Call of Cthulhu series "Time for Chaos."

== Filmography ==
=== Film ===
Year	Title	Role	Notes
2004	The Devil Cats	Front Boy	
2008	Cloverfield	Party Goer	
2009	Still Waiting...	Mason	
2009	The Rebound	Mitch	
2014	Our RoboCop Remake	Medic 1	
2015	The Atticus Institute	Agent Barnes	
2017	Galaxy of Horrors	Handyman	
2019	Loners	Fed #226	

=== Television ===
Year	Title	Role	Notes
2009	CSI: Miami	Cameron West	2 episodes
2011	Happy Endings	Normal Guy #1	Episode: "Like Father, Like Gun"
2012	Modern Family	Toaster Guy	Episode: "Yard Sale"
2012	2 Broke Girls	Judah	Episode: "And the High Holidays"
2013	Go On	Waiter	Episode: "Go for the Gold Watch"
2013	Brooklyn Nine-Nine	Blunder	Episode: "Pilot"
2013	Parks and Recreation	Dirk	Episode: "The Cones of Dunshire"
2013	Masters of Sex	Jeremy	Episode: "Involuntary"
2014	New Girl	Tim	Episode: "Fired Up"
2014	House of Lies	Shane	Episode: "Zhang"
2014–2015	Chasing Life	Graham	12 episodes
2014–2021	NCIS: New Orleans	Sebastian Lund	155 episodes
