= James Hayman =

American film caster

- Born: Paterson, New Jersey, U.S.
- Other name: Jim Hayman
- Occupations: Film, television director, producer, cinematographer
- Years active: 1984–present
- Spouse: Annie Potts (m. 1990)
- Children: 2

James Hayman, sometimes credited as Jim Hayman, is an American television producer, director and cinematographer.

== Career ==
His credits include Judging Amy, Ugly Betty, Joan of Arcadia, Kingpin, The Sopranos, Any Day Now, ER, Lois & Clark: The New Adventures of Superman, Law & Order: Special Victims Unit, Huff, House M.D., The Client, Murder One, Texasville, Northern Exposure, Moon Over Miami, Law & Order, Harts of the West, Class of '96, Dangerous Minds, One West Waikiki, The Fosters, NCIS: New Orleans, NCIS: Hawaii, and other series.

== Personal life ==
Hayman is married to actress Annie Potts and is the father of two sons. He has a stepson from Potts' previous marriage.

== Awards and nominations ==
Hayman has been nominated for two Primetime Emmy Awards and a DGA Award.
