= List of NCIS: Origins episodes =

NCIS: Origins is an American police procedural television series that originally premiered on CBS on October 14, 2024. The series is a prequel to NCIS and it follows a younger Leroy Jethro Gibbs in 1991 during his early career as a Naval Investigative Service special agent at the Camp Pendleton office. The series was created by Gina Lucita Monreal and David J. North, who also served as showrunners, with Mark Harmon narrating as the older Gibbs.

The series stars Austin Stowell as Gibbs, with Kyle Schmid, Mariel Molino, Tyla Abercrumbie, Diany Rodriguez and Caleb Foote. CBS ordered the series in January 2024, and the first season premiered on October 14, 2024. In November 2024, CBS ordered five additional episodes for the first season, bringing it to 18 episodes. In February 2025, CBS renewed the series for a second season. In January 2026, the series was renewed for a third season.

As of November 10, 2026, 42 episodes of NCIS: Origins have aired, concluding the third season.

== Series overview ==
Season	Episodes	Originally released	
Season	Episodes	First released	Last released
1	18	October 14, 2024	April 28, 2025
2	18	October 14, 2025	May 5, 2026
3	10	October 6, 2026	January 19, 2027

== Episodes ==
=== Season 1 (2024–25) ===
No. overall	No. in season	Title	Directed by	Written by	Original release date	U.S. viewers (millions)
1	1	"Enter Sandman"	Niels Arden Oplev	Gina Lucita Monreal & David J. North	October 14, 2024	5.03
2	2	"Enter Sandman"	Niels Arden Oplev	Gina Lucita Monreal & David J. North	October 14, 2024	5.03
In October 1991, a young Leroy Jethro Gibbs starts his career as a newly minted special agent at the fledgling NIS Camp Pendleton Office, where he forges his place on a gritty ragtag team led by NCIS legend Mike Franks. His first case involves the investigation of a sniper called Sandman.
3	3	"Bend, Don't Break"	John Terlesky	Jon Worley	October 21, 2024	4.06
A murder near Camp Pendleton leads Gibbs and the team to a suburban mall in San Diego, where Gibbs takes matters into his own hands. Jackson Gibbs pays Franks an unexpected visit.
4	4	"All's Not Lost"	Hanelle M. Culpepper	Michael J. Ballin & Thomas Aguilar	October 28, 2024	3.77
Still grieving the loss of his wife and daughter, Gibbs helps the team work a case involving a missing girl. The moment that irrevocably changed Gibbs' life is revealed.
5	5	"Last Rites"	Lionel Coleman	Margarita Matthews	November 4, 2024	3.52
With the countdown on to an execution, Franks races to extricate the location of a missing body from a death row inmate and honor a promise he made to the victim's sister before time runs out.
6	6	"Incognito"	Pete Chatmon	Shalisha Francis-Feusner	November 11, 2024	3.90
Gibbs goes undercover for the first time with Lala as NIS works the case of a dead Navy seaman who may have been sharing top-secret intel that poses a threat to national security. Also, Lala struggles with her place on the team and an unexpected development in her personal life.
7	7	"One Flew Over"	Jessica Lowrey	Rafael Samano & Margarita Matthews & Gina Lucita Monreal	November 25, 2024	3.50
NIS investigates the murder of a dementia-afflicted Jane Doe. Also, flashbacks reveal the first time Gibbs met Franks.
8	8	"Sick as Our Secrets"	Ed Ornelas	Stephen Day & Daniel J. Egbert	December 2, 2024	3.79
Gibbs and the team investigate the case of a Navy priest who was killed in the confessional booth and may have been targeted by mistake. Meanwhile, Randy shows Gibbs the ropes of working a protective detail while struggling with a personal situation.
9	9	"Vivo o Muerto"	Loren Yaconelli	Gina Lucita Monreal & Michael J. Ballin & Thomas Aguilar & Rafael Samano	December 9, 2024	3.40
The case of a missing woman who disappeared after a night of clubbing with a Navy seaman takes the team to Mexico, where they learn of a possible connection to Gibbs' past.
10	10	"Blue Bayou"	John Terlesky	David J. North & Gina Lucita Monreal & Brendan Fehily	December 16, 2024	3.48
As Leroy Jethro Gibbs prepares for his first Christmas without his wife and daughter, flashbacks reveal the unlikely journey that led to his first day on the job as a special agent at NIS' Camp Pendleton office working with Mike Franks and Lala.
11	11	"Flight of Icarus"	Ruben Garcia	Jennifer Corbett & Gina Lucita Monreal	January 27, 2025	4.10
The team investigates the death of a famed Marine commander's son, while a pivotal part of Franks' past involving his family is revealed.
12	12	"Touchstones"	Anya Adams	Gina Lucita Monreal & David J. North & Brendan Fehily	February 3, 2025	3.91
When the evidence room is broken into and significant cash goes missing, the team looks into a connection to a recent case. Also, Lala opens up to Gibbs, and Kowalski struggles to move forward with the stress of the break-in and his memories from the Korean War.
13	13	"Monsoon"	Hanelle M. Culpepper	Gina Lucita Monreal	February 10, 2025	3.70
The team investigates the brutal murder of a veteran who fell on hard times after serving in Vietnam, leading Franks to reflect on his own struggles following the war while Gibbs considers a new path forward.
14	14	"To Have and to Hold"	Diana Valentine	Shalisha Francis-Feusner	March 24, 2025	3.77
The team works the case of an investment advisor found dead shortly after her release from prison while Mary Jo is left reeling by an unexpected development in her personal life.
15	15	"From the Ashes"	Hanelle M. Culpepper	Margarita Matthews	March 31, 2025	3.54
The team investigates the brutal murder of a military sergeant found burned in her car, a case Franks suspects could have a connection to the assault of his estranged girlfriend, Tish.
16	16	"Bugs"	Jessica Lowrey	Jennifer Corbett & Michael J. Ballin & Thomas Aguilar	April 14, 2025	3.57
The events of this episode takes place on February 7, 1992. Vera receives an unexpected call from Bugs, who claims he's ready to answer more questions from prison after being identified as the sniper known as "Sandman". When she arrives, Bugs has suddenly changed his mind, prompting the team to reconsider the case and race against the clock to try and stop another tragedy.
17	17	"Darlin', Don't Refrain"	Pamela Romanowsky	Story by : Gina Lucita Monreal & David J. North & Brendan Fehily; Teleplay by : David J. North & Brendan Fehily	April 21, 2025	3.89
After the shocking developments in the Sandman case, the team works with the FBI to investigate further. While Wheeler struggles to hold onto his job, his family reaches a crisis point.
18	18	"Cecilia"	Niels Arden Oplev	Gina Lucita Monreal	April 28, 2025	3.87
When the murder of Pedro Hernandez is unearthed, Gibbs faces a reckoning but when he needs his team most, the loyalty of one is brought into question.

=== Season 2 (2025–26) ===
No. overall	No. in season	Title	Directed by	Written by	Original release date	U.S. viewers (millions)
19	1	"The Funky Bunch"	Niels Arden Oplev	Gina Lucita Monreal	October 14, 2025	3.66
Gibbs and Franks investigate the disappearance of a young Marine connected to a mysterious compound with a charismatic leader, and Lala's fate is revealed.
20	2	"Who by Fire"	Jessica Lowrey	Matthew T. Brown	October 21, 2025	3.83
When the body of a college swimmer washes up on the beach, the team must determine if it was an accident or murder while Gibbs prepares for his first interrogation.
21	3	"The Edge"	Patrick Cady	Story by : Margarita Matthews & Gina Lucita Monreal; Teleplay by : Margarita Matthews	October 28, 2025	3.79
When Dr. Donald "Ducky" Mallard, a liaison from DC Headquarters and an old acquaintance of Gibbs, arrives to evaluate whether Pendleton needs an in-house medical examiner, not everyone trusts that’s the real reason behind his visit.
22	4	"No Man Left Behind"	James Whitmore Jr.	Story by : Gina Lucita Monreal & Gia Gordon; Teleplay by : Gia Gordon	November 4, 2025	3.85
The team investigates the robbery of a Navy bank while Lala, still struggling after her accident, makes a decision about her future and also Franks’ estranged older brother, Mason, blows into town, desperate for help after hitting rock bottom.
23	5	"Funny How Time Slips Away"	Niels Arden Oplev	Story by : Gina Lucita Monreal & David J. North; Teleplay by : David J. North & Brendan Fehily	November 11, 2025	5.58
When a naval officer mysteriously dies, the team travel to the small dust-blown town of Serenity, Calif., where they encounter secret-harboring residents, an uncooperative sheriff and an investigation that will reverberate for decades. Note: This episode begins a crossover event that concludes on NCIS season 23 episode 5.
24	6	"Happy Birthday"	Lionel Coleman	Story by : Gina Lucita Monreal & Ryan Lee & Rafael Samano; Teleplay by : Ryan Lee & Rafael Samano	November 18, 2025	3.96
When an anonymous tip leads to the discovery of a young Marine's body at a chilling crime scene, Randy believes it could be connected to a previous case where a coin was left in the victim's throat while Franks tries to track down priceless packages meant for his brother, Mason.
25	7	"Crazy Little Thing Called Love"	Jann Turner	Story by : Corinne Marrinan & Jonny Gomez; Teleplay by : Corinne Marrinan & Jonny Gomez & Gina Lucita Monreal	December 2, 2025	4.45
The team investigates the murder of a Marine who had recently been handpicked for a classified mission as Wheeler's personal life is upended, Lala is thrown by unexpected news from Vera, and Gibbs and Diane double-date with Randy and his wife.
26	8	"End of the Road"	Loren Yaconelli	Gina Lucita Monreal	December 9, 2025	4.06
When Lala's favorite CI is shot, the team joins forces with Oceanside PD to determine who was behind the attack while Franks visits his brother Mason at the compound and Gibbs's relationship with Diane is tested when she gets a job in Los Angeles.
27	9	"Fools Rush In"	Diana Valentine	Margarita Matthews	March 3, 2026	3.32
As the team discovers Gibbs's drunken Vegas elopement with Diane, the newlyweds contemplate their future while the team investigates a fatal movie theater bombing with a connection to the Pruitt compound where Franks's brother Mason is staying.
28	10	"Lean on Me"	Patrick Cady	Gina Lucita Monreal	March 10, 2026	3.24
When a marine captain shows up at Camp Pendleton exhibiting symptoms of a fatal virus, NIS goes on lockdown and Gibbs is forced to take charge. As panic spreads, the team races to determine whether it really is a deadly outbreak or something else entirely.
29	11	"Feelin' Alright?"	Hanelle M. Culpepper	Ron McGee	March 17, 2026	3.33
When a lieutenant's water-logged body is discovered with a potential connection to an international smuggling ring, NIS Panama agents are called in to assist, and Gibbs comes face-to-face with an old nemesis: Special Agent Dwayne Pride. Once the two are assigned to a dangerous undercover mission together, Gibbs must find a way to move on from their past.
30	12	"The Gambler"	Lionel Coleman	Story by : André Jacquemetton & Maria Jacquemetton; Teleplay by : André Jacquemetton & Maria Jacquemetton and Gina Lucita Monreal	March 24, 2026	3.37
When the NIS Regional Director tries to transfer Mary Jo, she reconnects with an old friend from Atlantic City to help investigate the roadside deaths of two Marines.
31	13	"Homeward Bound"	Jessica Lowrey	Margarita Matthews	March 31, 2026	3.32
When Dr. Tango is arrested for stealing human remains from a national park, Dr. Donald "Ducky" Mallard returns to assist the team in proving his innocence.
32	14	"The Beautiful Ballad of Gary Callahan"	Diana Valentine	David J. North & Daniel J. Egbert	April 7, 2026	3.37
When the team's trusted K-9 agent, Gary Callahan, is critically wounded at a crime scene, NIS races to track down the culprit while a surprising pre-Pendleton chapter in Franks' life is revealed.
33	15	"Johnny B. Goode"	Anthony Hemingway	Gina Lucita Monreal	April 14, 2026	3.21
Lala's determination to get Manny out of gang life lands the team in the middle of a turf war.
34	16	"Who's Gonna Drive You Home?"	Loren Yaconelli	Ron McGee	April 21, 2026	3.65
While Gibbs and Lala grow closer on a case, Gibbs' long-distance relationship with Diane is further tested by the arrival of an unexpected guest: Gibbs' father, Jackson.
35	17	"Rule 13"	Jessica Lowrey	Gina Lucita Monreal & Jai Jamison & Ryan Lee	April 28, 2026	3.56
Wheeler takes command when a car bomb goes off outside NIS office. Also, the truth about Franks' distaste for lawyers is revealed.
36	18	"Hollywood Ending"	Niels Arden Oplev	Gina Lucita Monreal	May 5, 2026	4.03
With the Camp Pendleton office in danger of being shut down, the team confronts an uncertain future.

=== Season 3 (2026) ===
Mark Harmon is promoted to series regular after he guest starred in season 1 & 2 and as narrator.

No. overall	No. in season	Title	Directed by	Written by	Original release date	U.S. viewers (millions)
37	1	"Don't You Forget About Me"	Niels Arden Oplev	David J. North & Daniel J. Egbert	October 6, 2026	4.39
38	2	"My Own Worst Enemy"	Jessica Lowrey	Laura Valdivia	October 13, 2026	4.12
39	3	"Return of the Mack"	James Whitmore Jr.	Nichole Millard	October 20, 2026	4.32
40	4	"Shimmy Shimmy Ya"	Patrick Cady	Steven Paul Martinez	October 27, 2026	3.75
41	5	"Baila Esta Cumbia"	Anthony Hemingway	Kathryn Price	November 10, 2026	4.15
42	6	"Shot Through the Heart"	Lionel Coleman	Noah Schechter	November 17, 2026	3.94
43	7	"Don't Let the Days Go By"	Jann Turner	Jai Jamison & Ryan Lee	December 1, 2026	TBD
44	8	"Luis"	John Terlesky	Kathryn Price & Nichole Millard & Steven Paul Martinez	December 8, 2026	TBD

== Ratings ==
NCIS: Origins : U.S. viewers per episode (millions)

Season	Episode number																	
Season	1	2	3	4	5	6	7	8	9	10	11	12	13	14	15	16	17	18
1	5.03	5.03	4.06	3.77	3.52	3.90	3.50	3.79	3.40	3.48	4.10	3.91	3.70	3.77	3.54	3.57	3.89	3.87
2	3.66	3.83	3.79	3.85	5.58	3.96	4.45	4.06	3.32	3.24	3.33	3.37	3.32	3.37	3.21	3.65	3.56	4.03
3	4.39	4.12	4.32	3.75	4.15	3.94	–											

Audience measurement performed by Nielsen Media Research

=== Season 1 ===
Viewership and ratings per episode of List of NCIS: Origins episodes
No.	Title	Air date	Rating/share (18–49)	Viewers (millions)	DVR (18–49)	DVR viewers (millions)	Total (18–49)	Total viewers (millions)	Ref.
1	"Enter Sandman, Part 1"	October 14, 2024	0.3/3	5.03	0.2	2.24	0.5	7.27	
2	"Enter Sandman, Part 2"	October 14, 2024	0.3/3	5.03	0.2	2.24	0.5	7.27	
3	"Bend, Don't Break"	October 21, 2024	0.4/4	4.06	0.1	2.24	0.5	6.30	
4	"All's Not Lost"	October 28, 2024	0.3/3	3.77	0.1	2.20	0.4	5.97	
5	"Last Rites"	November 4, 2024	0.3/3	3.52	0.1	2.33	0.5	5.84	
6	"Incognito"	November 11, 2024	0.3/3	3.90	0.2	2.33	0.4	6.23	
7	"One Flew Over"	November 25, 2024	0.2/3	3.50	0.1	2.20	0.3	5.70	
8	"Sick as Our Secrets"	December 2, 2024	0.3/3	3.79	0.2	2.40	0.4	6.19	
9	"Vivo o Muerto"	December 9, 2024	0.2/2	3.40	0.2	2.28	0.4	5.68	
10	"Blue Bayou"	December 16, 2024	0.3/3	3.48	0.2	2.17	0.4	5.65	
11	"Flight of Icarus"	January 27, 2025	0.3/5	4.10	0.2	2.27	0.5	6.38	
12	"Touchstones"	February 3, 2025	0.3/5	3.91	0.1	2.28	0.4	6.19	
13	"Monsoon"	February 10, 2025	0.3/5	3.70	0.1	2.13	0.4	5.83	
14	"To Have and To Hold"	March 24, 2025	0.3/4	3.77	0.1	2.22	0.4	5.99	
15	"From the Ashes"	March 31, 2025	0.2/3	3.54	—N/a	—N/a	—N/a	—N/a	
16	"Bugs"	April 14, 2025	0.2/4	3.57	—N/a	—N/a	—N/a	—N/a	
17	"Darlin', Don't Refrain"	April 21, 2025	0.3/4	3.89	—N/a	—N/a	—N/a	—N/a	
18	"Cecilia"	April 28, 2025	0.3/4	3.87	0.1	2.03	0.4	5.90	

=== Season 2 ===
Viewership and ratings per episode of List of NCIS: Origins episodes
No.	Title	Air date	Rating/share (18–49)	Viewers (millions)	DVR (18–49)	DVR viewers (millions)	Total (18–49)	Total viewers (millions)	Ref.
1	"The Funky Bunch"	October 14, 2025	0.2/3	3.66	—N/a	—N/a	—N/a	—N/a	
2	"Who by Fire"	October 21, 2025	0.2/3	3.83	—N/a	—N/a	—N/a	—N/a	
3	"The Edge"	October 28, 2025	0.2/2	3.79	—N/a	—N/a	—N/a	—N/a	
4	"No Man Left Behind"	November 4, 2025	0.3/3	3.85	—N/a	—N/a	—N/a	—N/a	
5	"Funny How Time Slips Away"	November 11, 2025	0.4/5	5.58	—N/a	—N/a	—N/a	—N/a	
6	"Happy Birthday"	November 18, 2025	0.2/3	3.96	—N/a	—N/a	—N/a	—N/a	
7	"Crazy Little Thing Called Love"	December 2, 2025	0.29/5	TBD	—N/a	—N/a	—N/a	—N/a	
8	"End of the Road"	December 9, 2025	0.17/3	TBD	—N/a	—N/a	—N/a	—N/a	
9	"Fools Rush In"	March 3, 2026	TBD	TBD	—N/a	—N/a	—N/a	—N/a	
10	"Lean on Me"	March 10, 2026	TBD	TBD	—N/a	—N/a	—N/a	—N/a	n/a
11	"Feelin' Alright?"	March 17, 2026	TBD	TBD	—N/a	—N/a	—N/a	—N/a	n/a
12	"The Gambler"	March 24, 2026	TBD	TBD	—N/a	—N/a	—N/a	—N/a	n/a
13	"Homeward Bound"	March 31, 2026	TBD	TBD	—N/a	—N/a	—N/a	—N/a	n/a
14	"The Beautiful Ballad of Gary Callahan"	April 7, 2026	TBD	TBD	—N/a	—N/a	—N/a	—N/a	n/a
15	"Johnny B. Goode"	April 14, 2026	TBD	TBD	—N/a	—N/a	—N/a	—N/a	n/a
16	"Who's Gonna Drive You Home?"	April 21, 2026	TBD	TBD	—N/a	—N/a	—N/a	—N/a	n/a
17	"Rule 13"	April 28, 2026	TBD	TBD	—N/a	—N/a	—N/a	—N/a	n/a
18	"Hollywood Ending"	May 5, 2026	TBD	TBD	—N/a	—N/a	—N/a	—N/a	n/a

== See also ==
- NCIS franchise
- List of NCIS episodes
- List of NCIS: Los Angeles episodes
- List of NCIS: New Orleans episodes
- List of NCIS: Hawaiʻi episodes
- List of NCIS: Sydney episodes
