= NCIS (franchise) =

American media franchise

- Created by: NCIS; Donald P. Bellisario; Don McGill; NCIS: Los Angeles; Shane Brennan; NCIS: New Orleans; Gary Glasberg; NCIS: Hawaiʻi; Christopher Silber; Jan Nash; Matt Bosack; NCIS: Sydney; Morgan O'Neill; NCIS: Origins; Gina Lucita Monreal; David J. North; NCIS: Tony & Ziva; John McNamara; NCIS: New York; R. Scott Gemmill; Byron Balasco
- Original work: NCIS
- Owner: CBS Studios
- Years: 2003–present

Films and television
- Television series: NCIS; NCIS: Los Angeles; NCIS: New Orleans; NCIS: Hawaiʻi; NCIS: Sydney; NCIS: Origins; NCIS: Tony & Ziva; NCIS: New York

Games
- Video game: NCIS (video game)

Audio
- Soundtracks: NCIS Volumes 1–3; NCIS: Benchmark; NCIS: Los Angeles: The Original TV Soundtrack

NCIS (Naval Criminal Investigative Service) is a media franchise of American television programs originally created by Donald P. Bellisario and currently broadcast on CBS, all of which deal with military related criminal investigations based on the Naval Criminal Investigative Service of the United States Department of the Navy.

In 2003, NCIS was introduced via a backdoor pilot from the TV show JAG. Over the years, NCIS itself has spawned several spin-offs: NCIS: Los Angeles (2009), NCIS: New Orleans (2014), NCIS: Hawaiʻi (2021), NCIS: Sydney (2023), NCIS: Origins (2024), NCIS: Tony & Ziva (2025) and NCIS: New York (2026). NCIS: Los Angeles had a proposed spin-off, NCIS: Red, but it was not picked up by CBS.

Eight television series make up the NCIS franchise: NCIS, Los Angeles, New Orleans, Hawaiʻi, Sydney, Origins, Tony & Ziva, and New York. All series in total amount to 1,135 episodes across 54 seasons of television. The main NCIS series, which is the longest-running show of the franchise, premiered its twenty-fourth season on October 6, 2026.

== Series ==
The first three series (as well as the intended NCIS: Red), were spun off via a two-part episode from an established series, serving in effect as a backdoor pilot, such as with characters from the NCIS series having been introduced in JAG.

| Series | Television seasons | | | | | | | | | | | | | | | | | | | | | | | | |
| Series | 2002–03 | 2003–04 | 2004–05 | 2005–06 | 2006–07 | 2007–08 | 2008–09 | 2009–10 | 2010–11 | 2011–12 | 2012–13 | 2013–14 | 2014–15 | 2015–16 | 2016–17 | 2017–18 | 2018–19 | 2019–20 | 2020–21 | 2021–22 | 2022–23 | 2023–24 | 2024–25 | 2025–26 | 2026–27 |
|---|---|---|---|---|---|---|---|---|---|---|---|---|---|---|---|---|---|---|---|---|---|---|---|---|---|
| NCIS | Pilot | 1 | 2 | 3 | 4 | 5 | 6 | 7 | 8 | 9 | 10 | 11 | 12 | 13 | 14 | 15 | 16 | 17 | 18 | 19 | 20 | 21 | 22 | 23 | 24 |
| NCIS: Los Angeles | | | | | | | Pilot | 1 | 2 | 3 | 4 | 5 | 6 | 7 | 8 | 9 | 10 | 11 | 12 | 13 | 14 | | | | |
| NCIS: New Orleans | | | | | | | | | | | | Pilot | 1 | 2 | 3 | 4 | 5 | 6 | 7 | | | | | | |
| NCIS: Hawaiʻi | | | | | | | | | | | | | | | | | | | | 1 | 2 | 3 | | | |
| NCIS: Sydney | | | | | | | | | | | | | | | | | | | | | | 1 | 2 | 3 | 4 |
| NCIS: Origins | | | | | | | | | | | | | | | | | | | | | | | 1 | 2 | 3 |
| NCIS: Tony & Ziva | | | | | | | | | | | | | | | | | | | | | | | | 1 | |
| NCIS: New York | | | | | | | | | | | | | | | | | | | | | | | | | 1 |

=== NCIS (2003–present) ===
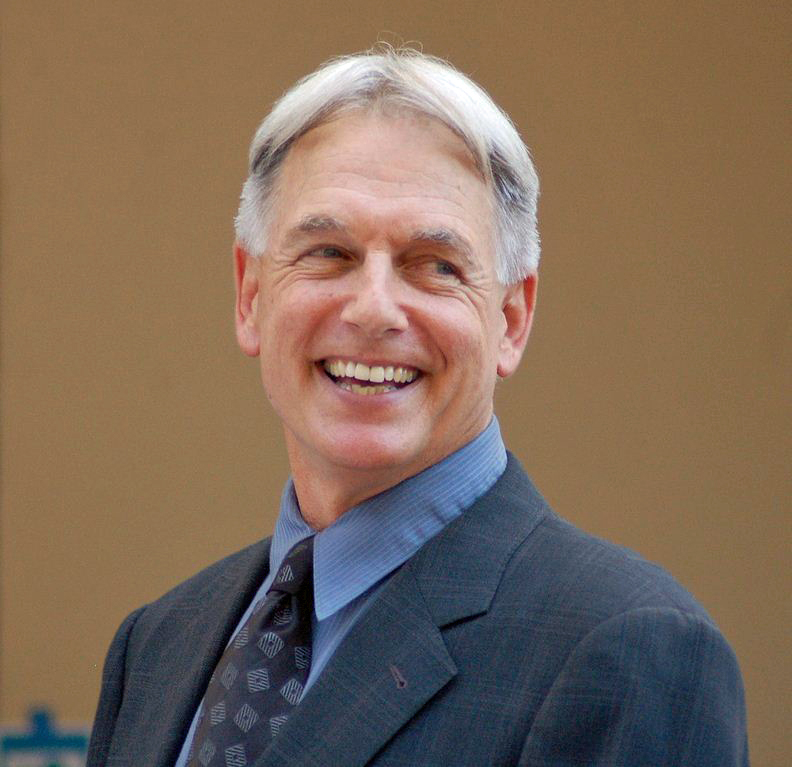
Mark Harmon starred in NCIS.

=== NCIS: Los Angeles (2009–2023) ===
NCIS: Los Angeles premiered on September 22, 2009 as the first spin-off of NCIS. The series starred rapper LL Cool J and actor Chris O'Donnell as special agents Sam Hanna and Grisha Callen, who worked for the Office of Special Projects in Los Angeles under operations manager Henrietta "Hetty" Lange (Linda Hunt). A two-part backdoor pilot for the series aired during the sixth season of NCIS earlier in the year. The series concluded on May 21, 2023, after its 14th and final season.

=== NCIS: New Orleans (2014–2021) ===
NCIS: New Orleans premiered on September 23, 2014, as the second spin-off of NCIS; it followed an NCIS division based in New Orleans led by Supervisory Special Agent Dwayne Cassius Pride (Scott Bakula). A two-part backdoor pilot aired during the eleventh season of NCIS.

=== NCIS: Hawaiʻi (2021–2024) ===
NCIS: Hawaiʻi premiered September 20, 2021, as the third spin-off of NCIS; the series followed the staff of the NCIS Pearl Harbor Field Office in Hawaii led by Special Agent in Charge Jane Tennant (Vanessa Lachey), the first female lead in the NCIS franchise. On April 26, 2024, the series was cancelled after three seasons.

=== NCIS: Sydney (2023–present) ===
On February 16, 2022, Paramount announced that a spin-off set in Sydney, Australia had been ordered by Network 10 and Paramount+; Shane Brennan had been announced as the showrunner for the spin-off, which would be the first set outside of the United States. The series premiered in Australia on Paramount+ on November 10, 2023, and aired on Network 10 from May 15, 2024. It was also announced that in the United States, amid the suspension of other NCIS productions due to the 2023 Hollywood labor disputes, the series would also begin airing on a delayed basis on CBS from November 14. The series was available for streaming in selected territories internationally on Paramount+. Its second season premiered on February 7, 2025.

The cast is led by Olivia Swann and Todd Lasance, with Sean Sagar, Tuuli Narkle, Mavournee Hazel and William McInnes.

=== NCIS: Origins (2024–present) ===
In January 2024, CBS ordered the prequel series NCIS: Origins; set in the 1990s and executive produced by Mark Harmon, it follows the beginning of Leroy Jethro Gibbs' career as a special agent of the NIS's Camp Pendleton branch, under a team led by Mike Franks. The series stars Austin Stowell as a younger Gibbs, with Harmon reprising his role as the present-day, retired Gibbs, who serves as narrator. The series premiered on October 14, 2024.

=== NCIS: Tony & Ziva (2025) ===
On February 28, 2024, it was announced that Paramount+ had ordered another spin-off of NCIS focusing on Michael Weatherly and Cote de Pablo's characters Tony DiNozzo and Ziva David. On May 7, 2024, the official Instagram for the NCIS franchise presented a call between Weatherly and de Pablo where the spin-off title was confirmed to be NCIS: Tony & Ziva. Production began in June 2024 in Budapest. CBS Studios produces Tony & Ziva. John McNamara is the showrunner and executive produces with Weatherly, de Pablo, Laurie Lieser, Christina Strain, Shelley Meals and Mairzee Almas.

It was cancelled after one season on December 19, 2025.

=== NCIS: New York ===
On April 15, 2026, it was announced that CBS had ordered NCIS: New York to series for a premiere in the 2026–27 television season; it will co-star LL Cool J and Scott Caan, with LL Cool J reprising his NCIS: Los Angeles character Sam Hanna as he returns to his hometown of New York City. The pilot episode was written by R. Scott Gemmill, who had previously served as a showrunner for Los Angeles.

== Main cast ==
| Primary series | Character | Portrayed by | Appearances | | | | | | | |
| Primary series | Character | Portrayed by | NCIS | Los Angeles | New Orleans | Hawaiʻi | Sydney | Origins | Tony & Ziva | New York |
|---|---|---|---|---|---|---|---|---|---|---|
| NCIS | Leroy Jethro Gibbs | Mark Harmon | Main | | Guest | | | Main | | |
| NCIS | Caitlin "Kate" Todd | Sasha Alexander | Main | | | | | | | |
| NCIS | Anthony "Tony" DiNozzo | Michael Weatherly | Main | Guest | | | | Guest | Main | |
| NCIS | Abby Sciuto | Pauley Perrette | Main | Guest | | | | | | |
| NCIS | Donald "Ducky" Mallard | David McCallum† | Main | | Guest | | | | | |
| NCIS | Timothy McGee | Sean Murray | Main | | Guest | | | | | |
| NCIS | Ziva David | Cote de Pablo | Main | | | | | | Main | |
| NCIS | Jenny Shepard | Lauren Holly | Main | | | | | | | |
| NCIS | Leon Vance | Rocky Carroll | Main | Recurring | Guest | | | | | |
| NCIS | Jimmy Palmer | Brian Dietzen | Main | | Guest | | | | | Guest |
| NCIS | Eleanor "Ellie" Bishop | Emily Wickersham | Main | | Guest | | | Guest | | |
| NCIS | Nicholas "Nick" Torres | Wilmer Valderrama | Main | Guest | | | | | | |
| NCIS | Alexandra "Alex" Quinn | Jennifer Esposito | Main | | | | | | | |
| NCIS | Clayton Reeves | Duane Henry | Main | | | | | | | |
| NCIS | Jacqueline Sloane | Maria Bello | Main | | | | | | | |
| NCIS | Kasie Hines | Diona Reasonover | Main | | | Guest | | | | |
| NCIS | Jessica Knight | Katrina Law | Main | | | Guest | | | | |
| NCIS | Alden Parker | Gary Cole | Main | Guest | | Guest | | | | |
| Los Angeles | G. Callen | Chris O'Donnell | Guest | Main | | Guest | | | | |
| Los Angeles | Nate "Doc" Getz | Peter Cambor | Guest | Main | | | | | | |
| Los Angeles | Kensi Blye | Daniela Ruah | Guest | Main | | | | | | |
| Los Angeles | Dominic Vail | Adam Jamal Craig | | Main | | | | | | |
| Los Angeles | Sam Hanna | LL Cool J | Guest | Main | | Recurring | | | | Main |
| Los Angeles | Henrietta "Hetty" Lange | Linda Hunt | | Main | | | | | | |
| Los Angeles | Eric Beale | Barrett Foa | Guest | Main | | | | | | |
| Los Angeles | Marty Deeks | Eric Christian Olsen | | Main | | | | | | |
| Los Angeles | Nell Jones | Renée Felice Smith | | Main | | | | | | |
| Los Angeles | Owen Granger | Miguel Ferrer† | | Main | | | | | | |
| Los Angeles | Shay Mosley | Nia Long | | Main | | | | | | |
| Los Angeles | Fatima Namazi | Medalion Rahimi | | Main | | | | | | |
| Los Angeles | Devin Rountree | Caleb Castille | | Main | | | | | | |
| Los Angeles | Hollace Kilbride | Gerald McRaney | | Main | | | | | | |
| New Orleans | Dwayne Cassius Pride | Scott Bakula | Guest | | Main | | | | | |
| New Orleans | Christopher LaSalle | Lucas Black | Guest | | Main | | | | | |
| New Orleans | Meredith Brody | Zoe McLellan | Guest | | Main | | | | | |
| New Orleans | Sebastian Lund | Rob Kerkovich | | | Main | | | | | |
| New Orleans | Loretta Wade | C. C. H. Pounder | Guest | | Main | | | | | |
| New Orleans | Patton Plame | Daryl Mitchell | | | Main | | | | | |
| New Orleans | Sonja Percy | Shalita Grant | Guest | | Main | | | | | |
| New Orleans | Tammy Gregorio | Vanessa Ferlito | | | Main | | | | | |
| New Orleans | Hannah Khoury | Necar Zadegan | | | Main | | | | | |
| New Orleans | Quentin Carter | Charles Michael Davis | | | Main | | | | | |
| New Orleans | Rita Devereaux | Chelsea Field | | | Main | | | | | |
| Hawaiʻi | Jane Tennant | Vanessa Lachey | Guest | | | Main | | | | |
| Hawaiʻi | Kai Holman | Alex Tarrant | | | | Main | | | | |
| Hawaiʻi | Jesse Boone | Noah Mills | Guest | | | Main | | | | |
| Hawaiʻi | Lucy Tara | Yasmine Al-Bustami | Guest | | | Main | | | | |
| Hawaiʻi | Ernie Malik | Jason Antoon | Guest | | | Main | | | | |
| Hawaiʻi | Kate Whistler | Tori Anderson | | | | Main | | | | |
| Hawaiʻi | Alex Tennant | Kian Talan | | | | Main | | | | |
| Sydney | Michelle Mackey | Olivia Swann | | | | | Main | | | |
| Sydney | Jim "JD" Dempsey | Todd Lasance | | | | | Main | | | |
| Sydney | DeShawn Jackson | Sean Sagar | | | | | Main | | | |
| Sydney | Evie Cooper | Tuuli Narkle | | | | | Main | | | |
| Sydney | Bluebird "Blue" Gleeson | Mavournee Hazel | | | | | Main | | | |
| Sydney | Roy "Rosie" Penrose | William McInnes | | | | | Main | | | |
| Origins | Leroy Jethro Gibbs | Austin Stowell | | | | | | Main | | |
| Origins | Mike Franks | Kyle Schmid | | | | | | Main | | |
| Origins | Lala Dominguez | Mariel Molino | | | | | | Main | | |
| Origins | Bernard "Randy" Randolf | Caleb Foote | | | | | | Main | | |
| Origins | Mary Jo Hayes | Tyla Abercrumbie | | | | | | Main | | |
| Origins | Vera Strickland | Diany Rodriguez | | | | | | Main | | |
| New York | Nick Schaeffer | Scott Caan | | | | | | | | Main |
| New York | Robyn Wells | Jennifer Beals | | | | | | | | Main |
| New York | Addison "Addy" Ross | Jacqueline Byers | | | | | | | | Main |
| New York | Wyatt Sellers | Shane Harper | | | | | | | | Main |
| New York | Sean Sullivan | Devin Druid | | | | | | | | Main |

== Crossovers ==
This is a complete list of crossovers, from only within the franchise (crossovers from other series, such as the franchises' backdoor pilot in JAG, are excluded). All characters, main, recurring, and shared guest stars, are credited.

| Series A | Series A episode title | Air date | Written by | Series B | Actors from series B appearing on series A | Crossover type |
|---|---|---|---|---|---|---|
| NCIS | "Legend (Part I)" | April 28, 2009 | Shane Brennan | NCIS: Los Angeles | Chris O'Donnell, Daniela Ruah, Peter Cambor, LL Cool J, Barrett Foa, Brian Avers | Backdoor pilot |
| NCIS | "Legend (Part II)" | May 5, 2009 | Shane Brennan | NCIS: Los Angeles | Chris O'Donnell, Daniela Ruah, Peter Cambor, LL Cool J, Barrett Foa, Brian Avers | Backdoor pilot |
| NCIS | "Endgame" | November 10, 2009 | Gary Glasberg | NCIS: Los Angeles | Kelly Hu | Character appearance |
| NCIS | "Crescent City (Part I)" | March 25, 2014 | Gary Glasberg | NCIS: New Orleans | Scott Bakula, Lucas Black, Zoe McLellan, C. C. H. Pounder | Backdoor pilot |
| NCIS | "Crescent City (Part II)" | April 1, 2014 | Gary Glasberg | NCIS: New Orleans | Scott Bakula, Lucas Black, Zoe McLellan, C. C. H. Pounder | Backdoor pilot |
| NCIS | "Sister City (Part I)" | January 5, 2016 | Christopher J. Waild | NCIS: New Orleans | Scott Bakula, Lucas Black, Zoe McLellan, Shalita Grant | Two-part episode |
| NCIS | "Pandora's Box (Part I)" | February 14, 2017 | Christopher J. Waild | NCIS: New Orleans | Scott Bakula, Lucas Black | Two-part episode |
| NCIS | "Starting Over" | March 28, 2022 | Margaret Rose Lester & Scott Williams | NCIS: Hawaiʻi | Vanessa Lachey | Two-part episode |
| NCIS | "The Brat Pack" | May 2, 2022 | Katherine Beattie & Kimberly-Rose Wolter | NCIS: Hawaiʻi | Jason Antoon | Character appearance |
| NCIS | "A Family Matter" | September 19, 2022 | Scott Williams | NCIS: Hawaiʻi | Vanessa Lachey, Jason Antoon | Two-part episode |
| NCIS | "Too Many Cooks" | January 9, 2023 | Christopher J. Walid | NCIS: Los Angeles | Chris O' Donnell, LL Cool J | Three-part episode |
| NCIS | "Too Many Cooks" | January 9, 2023 | Christopher J. Walid | NCIS: Hawaiʻi | Vanessa Lachey, Noah Mills | Three-part episode |
| NCIS | "A Thousand Yards" | April 15, 2024 | Diana Valentine | NCIS: Los Angeles | Daniela Ruah | Character appearance |
| NCIS | "A Thousand Yards" | April 15, 2024 | Diana Valentine | NCIS: Hawaiʻi | Vanessa Lachey | Character appearance |
| NCIS | "Now and Then" | November 11, 2025 | Marco Schnabel | NCIS: Origins | Bobby Moynihan, Ely Henry | Two-part episode |
| NCIS: Los Angeles | "Identity" | September 22, 2009 | Shane Brennan | NCIS | Rocky Carroll | Character appearance |
| NCIS: Los Angeles | "Search and Destroy" | October 13, 2009 | Gil Grant | NCIS | Rocky Carroll | Character appearance |
| NCIS: Los Angeles | "Killshot" | October 20, 2009 | Shane Brennan | NCIS | Rocky Carroll, Pauley Perrette | Character appearance |
| NCIS: Los Angeles | "Pushback" | November 10, 2009 | Shane Brennan | NCIS | Rocky Carroll | Character appearance |
| NCIS: Los Angeles | "Ambush" | November 17, 2009 | Lindsay Sturman | NCIS | Rocky Carroll | Character appearance |
| NCIS: Los Angeles | "Random on Purpose" | November 24, 2009 | Speed Weed | NCIS | Rocky Carroll, Pauley Perrette | Character appearance |
| NCIS: Los Angeles | "Hunted" | May 11, 2010 | Corey Miller | NCIS | Rocky Carroll | Character appearance |
| NCIS: Los Angeles | "Callen, G." | May 25, 2010 | Shane Brennan | NCIS | David Dayan Fisher | Character appearance |
| NCIS: Los Angeles | "Familia" | May 17, 2011 | Shane Brennan | NCIS | Rocky Carroll | Character appearance |
| NCIS: Los Angeles | "Lange, H." | September 25, 2011 | Shane Brennan | NCIS | Rocky Carroll | Character appearance |
| NCIS: Los Angeles | "Praesidium" | October 13, 2014 | Erin Broadhurst, R. Scott Gemmill | NCIS | Rocky Carroll | Character appearance |
| NCIS: Los Angeles | "Blame It on Rio" | October 19, 2015 | R. Scott Gemmill | NCIS | Michael Weatherly | Character appearance |
| NCIS: Los Angeles | "A Long Time Coming" | January 9, 2023 | R. Scott Gemmill | NCIS | Gary Cole, Wilmer Valderrama | Three-part episode |
| NCIS: Los Angeles | "A Long Time Coming" | January 9, 2023 | R. Scott Gemmill | NCIS: Hawaiʻi | Vanessa Lachey, Yasmine Al-Bustami | Three-part episode |
| NCIS: New Orleans | "Musician Heal Thyself" | September 23, 2014 | Jeffrey Lieber | NCIS | David McCallum | Character appearance |
| NCIS: New Orleans | "Carrier" | September 30, 2014 | Gary Glasberg | NCIS | Rocky Carroll, Michael Weatherly, Pauley Perrette, Meredith Eaton | Character appearance |
| NCIS: New Orleans | "Breaking Brig" | October 7, 2014 | Laurie Arent | NCIS | Rocky Carroll, Mark Harmon | Character appearance |
| NCIS: New Orleans | "It Happened Last Night" | October 21, 2014 | Jack Bernstein | NCIS | Rocky Carroll, Joe Spano | Character appearance |
| NCIS: New Orleans | "The Abyss" | January 13, 2015 | Sam Humphrey | NCIS | Diane Neal | Character appearance |
| NCIS: New Orleans | "The Walking Dead" | February 3, 2015 | David Appelbaum | NCIS | Diane Neal | Character appearance |
| NCIS: New Orleans | "Rock-A-Bye-Baby" | April 14, 2015 | Jonathan I. Kidd, Sonya Winton | NCIS | Diane Neal | Character appearance |
| NCIS: New Orleans | "Touched by the Sun" | October 6, 2015 | Laurie Arent | NCIS | Leslie Hope | Character appearance |
| NCIS: New Orleans | "Sister City, Part II" | January 5, 2016 | Christopher Silber | NCIS | Mark Harmon, Pauley Perrette, David McCallum, Emily Wickersham, Brian Dietzen | Two-part episode |
| NCIS: New Orleans | "Pandora's Box, Part II" | February 14, 2017 | Christopher Silber | NCIS | Mark Harmon, Sean Murray, Wilmer Valderrama | Two-part episode |
| NCIS: New Orleans | "See You Soon" | September 25, 2018 | Christopher Silber | NCIS | Mark Harmon | Character appearance |
| NCIS: Hawaiʻi | "T'N'T" | March 28, 2022 | Christopher Silber & Megan Bacharach | NCIS | Wilmer Valderrama, Gary Cole, Diona Reasonover, Katrina Law | Two-part episode |
| NCIS: Hawaiʻi | "Prisoners' Dilemma" | September 19, 2022 | Jan Nash & Christopher Silber | NCIS | Wilmer Valderrama, Gary Cole, Brian Dietzen, Diona Reasonover, Katrina Law | Two-part episode |
| NCIS: Hawaiʻi | "Deep Fake" | January 9, 2023 | Christopher Silber | NCIS | Gary Cole, Brian Dietzen | Three-part episode |
| NCIS: Hawaiʻi | "Deep Fake" | January 9, 2023 | Christopher Silber | NCIS: Los Angeles | Chris O'Donnell, LL Cool J | Three-part episode |
| NCIS: Origins | "Enter Sandman" | October 14, 2024 | Gina Lucita Monreal & David J. North | NCIS | Mark Harmon | Character appearance |
| NCIS: Origins | "Funny How Time Slips Away" | November 11, 2025 | Story by : Gina Lucita Monreal & David J. North; Teleplay by : David J. North & Brendan Fehily | NCIS | Mark Harmon | Two-part episode |

== Theme songs ==
| Series | Theme song |
|---|---|
| NCIS | "NCIS Theme" |
| NCIS: Los Angeles | "No Crew Is Superior" |
| NCIS: New Orleans | "Boom Boom" |
| NCIS: Sydney | "NCIS Theme" |
| NCIS: Origins | "NCIS Theme" |
| NCIS: Tony & Ziva | "Beyond the Border" |

== Reception ==
NCIS, voted America's favorite television series in 2011, finished its tenth season as the most-watched television series in the U.S. during 2012–13 U.S. network television season; and is broadcast in over 200 territories worldwide. As of the end of the 2014–15 U.S. network television season, NCIS remains TV's most watched drama series. Spin-off NCIS: New Orleans ended its first season as the second most watched drama on CBS, and the fifth most watched series on TV. NCIS: Los Angeles ended its fifth season as the fourth most watched series on TV, and the second most watched drama.

== Games ==
=== NCIS (2010) ===
NCIS is a video game released in 2010 for iOS, published by GameHouse. It's a mix between a hidden object game and a mini-game collection. Gamezebo said that NCIS is about exactly what you would expect from a licensed game on a mobile phone. It's quick, easy, and simple." AppSpy summarized: "Fans of the TV series may feel like they can get something out of this game, but from the corny lines to the poorly gathered evidence, NCIS: The Game from the TV Show is a game that's hard to recommend at all."

=== NCIS (2011) ===
NCIS is an adventure game developed by Ubisoft Shanghai and published by Ubisoft for Nintendo 3DS (as NCIS 3D), PlayStation 3, Wii, Microsoft Windows and Xbox 360 in 2011. It is based on the original NCIS TV series.

=== NCIS: Hidden Crimes ===
On September 15, 2016, Ubisoft launched a hidden-object mobile game titled NCIS: Hidden Crimes. Developed by Ubisoft Abu Dhabi (who also worked on CSI: Hidden Crimes) in conjunction with CBS Interactive, the game was released for Android & iOS devices.

== NCIS TV movies ==
In the UK, certain NCIS multi-part episodes were edited together to make a combined feature and shown on Channel 5, 5USA, CBS Action and Fox UK. These include:

| Title | Episodes edited together | Air date | Runtime | Source |
|---|---|---|---|---|
| The NCIS Movie: Enemies | "Enemies Foreign" / "Enemies Domestic" | May 20, 2013 | 1 hr, 20 mins | |
| The NCIS Movie: Judgement Day | "Judgment Day (Part I)" / "Judgment Day (Part II)" | June 10, 2013 | 1 hr, 40 mins | |
| The NCIS Movie: Legend (Legend Compilation) | "Legend (Part I)" / "Legend (Part II)" | June 10, 2013 | 1 hr, 45 mins | |
| The NCIS Movie: Kill Ari | "Kill Ari (Part I)" / "Kill Ari (Part II)" | August 22, 2013 | 2 hrs | |
| The NCIS Movie: War on Terror | "Engaged (Part I)" / "Engaged (Part II)" | February 1, 2014 | 1 hr, 20 mins | |
| The NCIS Movie: Payback | "Borderland" / "Patriot Down" / "Rule Fifty-One" | March 1, 2014 | 2 hrs, 35 mins | |
| The NCIS Movie: Shell Shock | "Shell Shock (Part I)" / "Shell Shock (Part II)" | April 11, 2014 | 1 hr, 30 mins | |
| Death Wish (Part I & II) | "Shabbat Shalom" / "Shiva" | April 16, 2014 (1); April 18, 2014 (2) | 1 hr, 40 mins | |
| The NCIS Movie: Race Against Terror: Hiatus | "Hiatus (Part I)" / "Hiatus (Part II)" | August 20, 2016; September 17, 2016 | 1 hr, 50 mins | |

== Abandoned spin-off ==
=== NCIS: Red ===
In November 2012, CBS commissioned a pilot episode for a potential NCIS: Los Angeles spinoff titled NCIS: Red. Written and produced by Shane Brennan, the series would follow "a mobile team of agents who live and work together as they go across the country to solve crimes". On February 6, 2013, John Corbett was cast as retired special agent Roy, the series male lead. Earlier, Miguel Ferrer would join the cast as a series regular, and reprising his NCIS: Los Angeles role, Edwin Hodge had been cast as Kai, an intelligence analyst, Scott Grimes was cast as Dave, Gillian Alexy was cast as Claire, and Kim Raver was cast in the pilot, playing the lead role of Paris. The pilot episode, titled "Red" and "Red-2", aired on March 19 and 26, 2013, during the fourth season of NCIS: Los Angeles. On May 15, 2013, CBS announced that the pilot would not be taken to series. On May 21, 2013, CBS President Nina Tassler stated that "sometimes [spinoffs] work and sometimes they don't. Protecting [the franchise] was really important." CBS was reportedly "open to redeveloping the pilot with a new cast attached", though a second franchise appearance by Scott Grimes in 2017 remains the only continuation of Red to date.
