= Teacup (TV series) =

2024 American television series

- Promotional poster
- Genre: Horror
- Created by: Ian McCulloch
- Inspired by: Stinger by Robert R. McCammon
- Showrunner: Ian McCulloch
- Starring: Yvonne Strahovski; Scott Speedman; Chaske Spencer; Boris McGiver; Émilie Bierre; Luciano Leroux; Caleb Dolden; Kathy Baker
- Composer: David Wingo
- Country of origin: United States
- Original language: English
- No. of seasons: 1
- No. of episodes: 8

Production
- Executive producers: Ian McCulloch; James Wan; Michael Clear; Rob Hackett; E. L. Katz; Francisca X. Hu; Robert R. McCammon; Kevin Tancharoen
- Producers: Yvonne Strahovski; Todd Leykamp
- Running time: 31–51 minutes
- Production companies: Parkside Baroo, Inc.; Atomic Monster; Population; Universal Content Productions

Original release
- Network: Peacock
- Release: October 10 – October 31, 2024

Teacup is an American horror television series created by Ian McCulloch for Peacock. Inspired by the Stinger novel by Robert R. McCammon, it stars Yvonne Strahovski and Scott Speedman.

The series premiered on October 10, 2024. In January 2025, Peacock canceled the series after one season.

== Premise ==
On an isolated ranch in rural Georgia, several people are forced together to face a mysterious threat.

== Cast and characters ==
=== Main ===
- Yvonne Strahovski as Maggie Chenoweth, a veterinarian, James' wife
- Scott Speedman as James Chenoweth, a carpenter, Maggie's husband
- Chaske Spencer as Ruben Shanley, a rancher, Valeria's husband
- Boris McGiver as Donald Kelly, an army veteran, Claire's husband
- Émilie Bierre as Meryl Chenoweth, daughter of Maggie and James
- Luciano Leroux as Nicholas Shanley, son of Ruben and Valeria
- Caleb Dolden as Arlo Chenoweth, son of Maggie and James
- Kathy Baker as Ellen Chenoweth, James' mother, suffering from multiple sclerosis

=== Supporting ===
- Diany Rodriguez as Valeria Shanley
- Holly A. Morris as Claire Kelly
- Adelina Anthony as Carmen Navarro
- Rob Morgan as McNab
- Bill Heck as Lt. Olsen
- Jackson Kelly as Travis
- Alice Kremelberg as Izzy

== Production ==
=== Development ===
In December 2022, it was announced Peacock had given a straight-to-series order to a contemporary horror series from Ian McCulloch and James Wan. E. L. Katz was announced as the director of the opening episode.

On January 17, 2025, Peacock canceled the series after one season.

=== Casting ===
In February 2024, it was announced Yvonne Strahovski had been cast in the series, now known as Teacup, as Maggie Chenoweth. Scott Speedman was cast that same month to star opposite Strahovski.

== Release ==
The first episode of the series was previewed at Fantastic Fest on September 22, 2024. The series premiered on Peacock on October 10, 2024, and consists of eight episodes.

== Episodes ==
| No. | Title | Directed by | Written by | Original release date |
|---|---|---|---|---|
| 1 | "Think About the Bubbles" | E. L. Katz | Ian McCulloch | October 10, 2024 |
| 2 | "My Little Lighthouse" | E. L. Katz | Ian McCulloch | October 10, 2024 |
| 3 | "Quiet for No Reason" | Chloe Okuno | Ian McCulloch | October 17, 2024 |
| 4 | "In the Heart of the Country" | Chloe Okuno | Ian McCulloch | October 17, 2024 |
| 5 | "I'm a Witness to the Sickness" | John Hyams | Michael A. O'Shea | October 24, 2024 |
| 6 | "You Don't Know What It Means to Win" | John Hyams | Francisca X. Hu | October 24, 2024 |
| 7 | "This Is Nowhere: Part 1" | Kevin Tancharoen | Zoe Cooper | October 31, 2024 |
| 8 | "This Is Nowhere: Part 2" | Kevin Tancharoen | Ian McCulloch | October 31, 2024 |

== Reception ==
=== Critical response ===
On the review aggregator website Rotten Tomatoes, 77% of 30 critics' reviews are positive, with an average rating of 6.5/10. The website's consensus reads: "Stylish and genuinely scary, Teacup's human drama has some spillage but the atmospheric frights of this horror series leave a pleasing aftertaste." Metacritic, which uses a weighted average, assigned the series a score of 54 out of 100 based, on 13 critics, indicating "mixed or average" reviews.

=== Accolades ===
In 2024, Teacup received a nomination for Best Horror Television Series in the 52nd Saturn Awards.
