= NCIS season 22 =

NCIS
- Season 22
- Season 22 U.S. DVD cover
- Starring: Sean Murray; Wilmer Valderrama; Katrina Law; Brian Dietzen; Diona Reasonover; Rocky Carroll; Gary Cole
- No. of episodes: 20

Release
- Original network: CBS
- Original release: October 14, 2024 – May 5, 2025

Season chronology
- ← Previous; Season 21 Next → Season 23

The twenty-second season of NCIS was announced on April 9, 2024 and premiered on October 14, 2024, and concluded on May 5, 2025, and contained 20 episodes. The series aired alongside NCIS: Origins and NCIS: Sydney. This is the third season (along with seasons 18 and 21) to not premiere in the usual September, delayed by the 2023 SAG-AFTRA strike. In February 2025, NCIS was renewed for 23rd season, which premiered on October 14, 2025, coinciding with Origins and Sydney.

== Premise ==
NCIS revolves around a fictional team of special agents from the Naval Criminal Investigative Service, which conducts criminal investigations involving the United States Navy and Marine Corps. Based at the Washington Navy Yard in Washington, D.C., the NCIS team is led by Supervisory Special Agent Alden Parker, an ex-FBI Special Agent and a skilled investigator.

== Cast and characters ==
=== Main ===
- Sean Murray as Timothy McGee, NCIS Senior Special Agent, Second in Command of the Major Case Response Team (MCRT) assigned to Washington's Navy Yard
- Wilmer Valderrama as Nick Torres, NCIS Special Agent
- Katrina Law as Jessica Knight, NCIS Special Agent
- Brian Dietzen as Dr. Jimmy Palmer, Chief Medical Examiner for NCIS
- Diona Reasonover as Kasie Hines, Forensic Specialist for NCIS
- Rocky Carroll as Leon Vance, NCIS Director
- Gary Cole as Alden Parker, NCIS Supervisory Special Agent (SSA) of MCRT and former FBI Special Agent

=== Recurring cast ===
- Rebecca De Mornay as Carla Marino, the mob boss of the Kansas City Mob.
- Laura San Giacomo as Dr. Grace Confalone, NCIS Forensic Technician
- Meredith Eaton as Carol Wilson, CDC immunologist and friend of Kasie, McGee, and Palmer
- Seamus Dever as Gabriel LaRoche, an Inspector General at the Department of Justice and NCIS Deputy Director
- Mary Cole as Aubrey the barista
- Lilan Bowden as Robin Knight, Knight’s sister
- Elle Graper as Victoria Palmer, Jimmy Palmer's daughter
- Zane Holtz as Dale Sawyer, NCIS Special Agent
- Francis X. McCarthy as Roman Parker, Alden's father
- Margo Harshman as Delilah Fielding-McGee, DoD Intelligence Analyst and McGee's wife

=== Notable guests ===
- Donna Mills as Wanda Prescott, widow of billionaire Gavin Prescott.
- Justin Bruening as Marine Lieutenant Bryce Prescott, Wanda’s grandson.
- Sara Paxton as Amber Carnahan
- Sam McMurray as Harold
- Melina Kanakaredes as Eleni Kostakis; Parker's crush, owner of Parker's favorite bakery Kostakis Bakery
- Matthew Lawrence as Danny Butler
- Shari Belafonte as Annabelle Davis, Kasie's forensic professor
- Erin Hayes as Wendy
- T. J. Thyne as Fletcher Voss, former CEO of Bandium
- LL Cool J as Sam Hanna, former NCIS Senior Field Agent

== Episodes ==
No. overall	No. in season	Title	Directed by	Written by	Original release date	Prod. code	U.S. viewers (millions)
468	1	"Empty Nest"	Diana Valentine	Christopher J. Waild	October 14, 2024	2201	6.42
With McGee interviewing for the Deputy Director position, Torres engaged in a cartel operation and Knight in California, Parker finds himself all alone at his desk. Suddenly he receives an emergency call from Torres asking for assistance, fearing his cover was blown. Suspecting a mole at Camp Pendelton within the REACT team, Parker flies to California to investigate. Alongside Knight, they began searching for Torres and the cartel boss, known as "El Padre". In the meantime, DoJ General Investigator Gabriel LaRoche investigates NCIS due to recent leaks in their operations, with REACT team member Moreno found as the main suspect. Knight, in order to prove Moreno's innocence and to save Torres' life, goes to extremes to expose "El Padre" and his accomplice and manages to save both agent's lives. Knight reveals to Parker that she wants to come back to D.C. Ultimately, McGee learns from Vance that the NCIS Deputy Director position was given to LaRoche rather than him, just a couple of minutes after he found out that the mole might have been someone at the high ranks of DoJ.
469	2	"Foreign Bodies"	Lionel Coleman	Marco Schnabel	October 21, 2024	2202	5.37
Vance prepares for diplomatic talks with Venezuela to improve relations between the countries, but a Venezuelan undercover agent is poisoned and drops dead in Vance's office. The team investigates discreetly while Vance's casual girlfriend Lena Paulsen (see 20x05 "Guardian") attends the talks as a NATO official. The case escalates to the prevention of an assassination attempt which would derail the talks entirely. After closing the case, Vance and Lena take a step forward in their relationship.
470	3	"The Trouble with Hal"	Michael Zinberg	Scott Williams	October 28, 2024	2203	4.92
A squatter called "Hal" is found murdered in the basement of a house belonging to a Navy SEAL returning from deployment, leading the team to investigate the history of the house. Meanwhile, Torres tries to convince his co-workers to turn Ducky's old office into a gym, leading Kasie to ask the others about alternate ways they would like to see it used. Also, McGee begins his own investigation into Deputy Director LaRoche, suspicious of his true loyalties.
471	4	"Sticks & Stones"	James Whitmore Jr.	Steven D. Binder	November 4, 2024	2204	4.76
Parker takes a call in the middle of the night that informs him that a threat made by Russia against Europe has been intercepted, which is feared to kick off a catastrophic global war. Parker tries to buy his team enough time to decode a second message before the acting president gives an order to launch a nuclear bomb against the assailant, which would almost certainly start a war. Meanwhile, Knight and Palmer finally talk about their future, and they admit they still love each other but whereas Knight wants to advance her career, Palmer wants stability for himself and Victoria following Breena and Ducky's deaths.
472	5	"In from the Cold"	Tawnia McKiernan	Matthew Lau	November 11, 2024	2205	5.26
A former Navy Captain with dementia is on the run when his memory lapses in and out, revealing his past as a Soviet spy. The team must work with the CIA to track him down before he leaks classified information. Meanwhile, Torres works on cultivating his profile on an online dating app.
473	6	"Knight and Day"	Rocky Carroll	Amy Rutberg	November 25, 2024	2206	4.92
After a top level defense contractor is attacked, Knight is assigned to protect his wife, who has a secret past of her own.
474	7	"Hardboiled"	José Clemente Hernandez	Andrew Bartels	December 2, 2024	2207	5.62
Torres receives info from a confidential informant that her Naval Intelligence husband is giving away classified information, only for the informant's husband to be found deceased. Meanwhile, Palmer and McGee work as youth soccer referees and deal with angry parents after McGee makes a controversial call.
475	8	"Out of Control"	Diana Valentine	Steven D. Binder & Scott Williams	December 9, 2024	2208	4.89
The team is called in when a car driven by an arguing married couple seems to begin driving itself to a warehouse where the husband is missing and another man is found beaten to death. Meanwhile, Parker visits Dr Grace Confalone after visions of a little girl named Lily start affecting his field work.
476	9	"Humbug"	Lionel Coleman	Christopher J. Waild	December 16, 2024	2209	4.92
Deputy Director LaRoche works with the team in the field when an exposé book that accuses a lieutenant of gross negligence by one of his officers (the brother of a deceased veteran himself) is about to hit the market. Meanwhile, Torres is seeing a new girlfriend for Christmas, unbeknownst to his co-workers.
477	10	"Baker's Man"	Rocky Carroll	Andrew Bartels	January 27, 2025	2210	5.71
When an employee of Parker's favorite bakery is found murdered, the team discovers that the owner is being blackmailed by criminals. Meanwhile, Torres struggles with telling Knight that he's dating her sister Robin. Knight eventually finds out and becomes furious with him, but eventually accepts the relationship.
478	11	"For Better or Worse"	Michael Zinberg	Marco Schnabel	February 3, 2025	2211	5.34
When Knight gets caught up in Torres's undercover operation with the Polish mob, the two stage a wedding to draw out the ringleader. During the case, Knight reveals she's still struggling with her sister and Torres being together.
479	12	"Fun and Games"	James Whitmore Jr.	Teleplay by : Matthew Lau & Steven D. Binder; Story by : Matthew Lau	February 10, 2025	2212	5.39
When one of Kasie’s forensic scientist associates is murdered, the team realizes her old professor is a target. Meanwhile, McGee faces scrutiny over his book by the Pentagon.
480	13	"Bad Blood"	José Clemente Hernandez	Sydney Mitchel	February 24, 2025	2213	5.36
The team investigates the death of a Navy lieutenant at a blood donation bank and discover a bigger crime at hand. Meanwhile, McGee needs help raising money for his twins' school fundraiser.
481	14	"Close to Home"	Tawnia McKiernan	Amy Rutberg	March 3, 2025	2214	5.22
When Torres is contacted by Jimmy's daughter who has discovered a large sum of money near the Navy library, the team investigates after finding it was stolen from a bank.
482	15	"Moonlit"	Marc Roskin	Scott Williams	March 24, 2025	2215	5.42
After a Navy lieutenant Special Agent Sawyer (Zane Holtz) is tied to is found dead, the team discover another murder and the turmoil of a wealthy but troubled family. Meanwhile, Parker learns more about the death of his mother.
483	16	"Ladies' Night"	Rocky Carroll	Sydney Mitchel	March 31, 2025	2216	5.28
The fiery death of a Petty Officer intrudes Jess, Kasie and Robin's ladies' night, much to Robin's annoyance. During the case, Torres reveals his struggle with balancing work life and being with Robin.
484	17	"Killer Instinct"	Lionel Coleman	Andrew Bartels	April 14, 2025	2217	5.07
Deputy Director LaRoche invites McGee and his wife Delilah to his house for dinner, much to McGee's annoyance. Meanwhile, the rest of the team investigates the contract killer known as "The Poet," and find LaRoche is one of his targets.
485	18	"After the Storm"	Diana Valentine	Matthew Lau & Sydney Mitchel	April 21, 2025	2218	5.80
When three combat vets are found dead in a D.C. motel room, the team finds a suspect who will only talk to Sam Hanna. Hanna finds out one of his old colleagues may be in danger. Meanwhile, Vance tells McGee to find solid evidence in his investigation of LaRoche or they will all face consequences.
486	19	"Irreconcilable Differences"	Michael Zinberg	Christopher J. Waild	April 28, 2025	2219	5.50
McGee's investigation of LaRoche comes to a head when a complaint is filed against him. Meanwhile, Torres and Knight find out they are actually legally married after their staged wedding and initially try to take advantage of the insurance benefits but reconsider when they learn they would have to be reassigned. The episode ends on a cliffhanger when the team apprehends LaRoche and he says, "it's time you know the truth."
487	20	"Nexus"	José Clemente Hernandez	Marco Schnabel	May 5, 2025	2220	5.59
LaRoche is revealed to be a double agent for the Department of Defense tasked with blowing Torres' cover to give the impression of a mole. Because NCIS unwittingly blew LaRoche's cover, they are told to bring down the Nexus cartel. Meanwhile, Parker begrudgingly works with his old nemesis, Kansas City mob boss Carla Marino, who claims she can help them take down Nexus. However, Marino herself is revealed to be the head of Nexus; blaming Parker for her son’s fatal motorcycle accident years prior, she shoots the former’s father dead.

== Production ==
This season was announced by CBS on April 9, 2024, and began filming in July 2024.

Production for this season was temporarily shut down from January 9, 2025 due to the January 2025 Southern California wildfires. Production resumed on January 13, 2025, with filming constrained to closed soundstages due to safety concerns and closely monitored by CBS's security and health and safety teams.

Filming wrapped up in late March 2025.

== Ratings ==
Viewership and ratings per episode of NCIS season 22
No.	Title	Air date	Rating/share (18–49)	Viewers (millions)	DVR (18–49)	DVR viewers (millions)	Total (18–49)	Total viewers (millions)
1	"Empty Nest"	October 14, 2024	0.4/4	6.42	0.1	2.50	0.5	8.92
2	"Foreign Bodies"	October 21, 2024	0.4/4	5.37	0.2	2.58	0.6	7.95
3	"The Trouble with Hal"	October 28, 2024	0.4/3	4.92	0.1	2.06	0.5	7.50
4	"Sticks & Stones"	November 4, 2024	0.4/4	4.76	0.1	2.70	0.5	7.46
5	"In From the Cold"	November 11, 2024	0.4/4	5.26	0.2	2.63	0.6	7.89
6	"Knight and Day"	November 25, 2024	0.3/3	4.92	0.2	2.67	0.5	7.59
7	"Hardboiled"	December 2, 2024	0.4/4	5.62	0.2	2.51	0.6	8.14
8	"Out of Control"	December 9, 2024	0.2/3	4.89	0.2	2.74	0.4	7.64
9	"Humbug"	December 16, 2024	0.3/3	4.92	0.2	2.73	0.6	7.65
10	"Baker's Man"	January 27, 2025	0.4/5	5.71	0.2	2.49	0.5	8.26
11	"For Better or Worse"	February 3, 2025	0.3/4	5.34	0.2	2.38	0.5	7.72
12	"Fun and Games"	February 10, 2025	0.4/5	5.39	0.1	2.47	0.5	7.85
13	"Bad Blood"	February 24, 2025	0.4/6	5.36	0.2	2.58	0.6	7.93
14	"Close to Home"	March 3, 2025	0.4/5	5.22	0.1	2.55	0.5	7.77
15	"Moonlift"	March 24, 2025	0.4/5	5.42	0.2	2.67	0.5	8.09
16	"Ladies' Night"	March 31, 2025	0.3/4	5.28	0.1	2.44	0.4	7.72
17	"Killer Instinct"	April 14, 2025	0.3/4	5.07	0.1	2.42	0.4	7.49
18	"After the Storm"	April 21, 2025	0.4/5	5.80	0.1	2.42	0.5	8.21
19	"Irreconcilable Differences"	April 28, 2025	0.3/5	5.50	0.1	2.42	0.5	7.92
20	"Nexus"	May 5, 2025	0.3/4	5.59	0.1	2.23	0.4	7.82
