= List of NCIS: Hawaiʻi episodes =

NCIS: Hawaiʻi is an American police procedural television series that premiered on CBS on September 20, 2021. The series is set in Oahu, Hawaii It stars Vanessa Lachey as Jane Tennant, the Special Agent in Charge of a fictional team of special agents from the Naval Criminal Investigative Service based in Hawaiʻi. The show is a spin-off of the series NCIS and the fourth series in the NCIS franchise. The series was created by Christopher Silber, Jan Nash, and Matt Bosack who also serve as writers and executive producers alongside Larry Teng who directed multiple episodes. The series also stars Alex Tarrant, Noah Mills, Yasmine Al-Bustami, Jason Antoon, Tori Anderson and Kian Talan. In March 2022, the series was renewed for a second season which premiered on September 19, 2022. In February 2023, the series was renewed for a third season which then premiered on February 12, 2024.

On April 26, 2024, Deadline reported that CBS had cancelled the show after three seasons. This follows the cancellation of two other NCIS spin-offs, NCIS: New Orleans and NCIS: Los Angeles.

During the course of the series, 54 episodes of NCIS: Hawaiʻi aired over three seasons, between September 20, 2021, and May 6, 2024.

== Series overview ==
Season	Episodes	Originally released	
Season	Episodes	First released	Last released
1	22	September 20, 2021	May 23, 2022
2	22	September 19, 2022	May 22, 2023
3	10	February 12, 2024	May 6, 2024

== Episodes ==
=== Season 1 (2021–22) ===
No. overall	No. in season	Title	Directed by	Written by	Original release date	Prod. code	U.S. viewers (millions)
1	1	"Pilot"	Larry Teng	Matt Bosack & Jan Nash & Christopher Silber	September 20, 2021	HAW101	6.59
2	2	"Boom"	Larry Teng	Jan Nash & Christopher Silber	September 27, 2021	HAW102	5.54
3	3	"Recruiter"	Ruben Garcia	Matt Bosack & Yalun Tu	October 4, 2021	HAW103	5.54
4	4	"Paniolo"	Larry Teng	Noah Evslin	October 11, 2021	HAW104	5.29
5	5	"Gaijin"	Tim Andrew	Ron McGee	October 18, 2021	HAW105	5.35
6	6	"The Tourist"	Yangzom Braun	Amy Rutberg	November 1, 2021	HAW106	5.07
7	7	"Rescuers"	James Bamford	Yakira Chambers	November 8, 2021	HAW107	5.11
8	8	"Legacy"	Lisa Demaine	Yalun Tu	November 29, 2021	HAW108	5.02
9	9	"Impostor"	Loren Yaconelli	Matt Bosack	December 6, 2021	HAW109	5.16
10	10	"Lost"	Tim Andrew	Jan Nash	January 3, 2022	HAW110	4.91
11	11	"The Game"	James Hayman	Noah Evslin & Amy Rutberg	January 17, 2022	HAW111	5.01
12	12	"Spies, Part 1"	LeVar Burton	Yakira Chambers & Ron McGee	January 23, 2022	HAW112	9.79
13	13	"Spies, Part 2"	Tessa Blake	Christopher Silber	January 24, 2022	HAW113	5.41
14	14	"Broken"	Norman Buckley	Matt Bosack & Jan Nash	February 28, 2022	HAW114	4.54
15	15	"Pirates"	Tim Andrew	Yalun Tu	March 7, 2022	HAW115	5.38
16	16	"Monster"	Leslie Hope	Ron McGee	March 14, 2022	HAW116	5.10
17	17	"Breach"	Christine Moore	Yakira Chambers	March 21, 2022	HAW118	5.07
18	18	"T'N'T"	Lionel Coleman	Christopher Silber & Megan Bacharach	March 28, 2022	HAW117	6.13
19	19	"Nurture"	Lin Oeding	Jan Nash	April 18, 2022	HAW119	5.09
20	20	"Nightwatch"	Tawnia McKiernan	Amy Rutberg	May 2, 2022	HAW120	5.21
21	21	"Switchback"	Jimmy Whitmore	Noah Evslin	May 16, 2022	HAW121	4.97
22	22	"Ohana"	Tim Andrew	Matt Bosack & Christopher Silber	May 23, 2022	HAW122	5.47

=== Season 2 (2022–23) ===
No. overall	No. in season	Title	Directed by	Written by	Original release date	Prod. code	U.S. viewers (millions)
23	1	"Prisoners' Dilemma"	Tim Andrew	Jan Nash & Christopher Silber	September 19, 2022	HAW201	5.31
24	2	"Blind Curves"	Yangzom Brauen	Matt Bosack	September 26, 2022	HAW202	4.58
25	3	"Stolen Valor"	Tim Andrew	Amy Rutberg	October 3, 2022	HAW203	4.91
26	4	"Primal Fear"	LeVar Burton	Ron McGee	October 10, 2022	HAW204	4.57
27	5	"Sudden Death"	Tawnia McKiernan	Yalun Tu	October 17, 2022	HAW205	4.96
28	6	"Changing Tides"	Lionel Coleman	Noah Evslin	October 24, 2022	HAW206	5.01
29	7	"Vanishing Act"	Diana C. Valentine	Mike Diaz & Jan Nash	November 14, 2022	HAW207	4.78
30	8	"Curtain Call"	Christine Moore	Yakira Chambers	November 21, 2022	HAW208	4.82
31	9	"Desperate Measures"	Kevin J. Berlandi	Ron McGee	December 5, 2022	HAW209	4.52
32	10	"Deep Fake"	Jimmy Whitmore	Christopher Silber	January 9, 2023	HAW211	7.36
33	11	"Rising Sun"	Christoph Schrewe	Megan Bacharach & Matt Bosack	January 16, 2023	HAW210	4.33
34	12	"Shields Up"	Norman Buckley	Jan Nash & Amy Rutberg	January 23, 2023	HAW212	5.27
35	13	"Misplaced Targets"	Larry Teng	Yalun Tu	February 6, 2023	HAW213	5.13
36	14	"Silent Invasion"	Eric Fox Hays	Mike Diaz	February 13, 2023	HAW214	5.01
37	15	"Good Samaritan"	Larry Teng	Noah Evslin	February 27, 2023	HAW215	5.12
38	16	"Family Ties"	Christine Moore	Ron McGee	March 13, 2023	HAW216	5.15
39	17	"Money Honey"	Loren Yaconelli	Megan Bacharach	March 20, 2023	HAW217	4.98
40	18	"Bread Crumbs"	LeVar Burton	Jan Nash	April 10, 2023	HAW218	5.02
41	19	"Cabin Fever"	Kurt Jones	Yakira Chambers	May 1, 2023	HAW219	4.84
42	20	"Nightwatch Two"	Tim Andrew	Amy Rutberg	May 8, 2023	HAW220	4.84
43	21	"Past Due"	Jimmy Whitmore	Christopher Silber & Yalun Tu	May 15, 2023	HAW221	4.95
44	22	"Dies Irae"	Tim Andrew	Matt Bosack & Jan Nash	May 22, 2023	HAW222	5.10

=== Season 3 (2024) ===
No. overall	No. in season	Title	Directed by	Written by	Original release date	Prod. code	U.S. viewers (millions)
45	1	"Run and Gun"	Tim Andrew	Jan Nash & Christopher Silber	February 12, 2024	HAW301	5.56
46	2	"Crash and Burn"	Tim Andrew	Jan Nash & Christopher Silber	February 19, 2024	HAW302	5.22
47	3	"License to Thrill"	Christine Moore	Ron McGee & Amy Rutberg	February 26, 2024	HAW303	5.40
48	4	"Dead on Arrival"	Larry Teng	Yalun Tu & Noah Evslin	March 4, 2024	HAW304	5.40
49	5	"Serve and Protect"	Yangzom Brauen	Story by : Matt Bosack; Teleplay by : Fallon O'Dowd & Matt Bosack	March 25, 2024	HAW305	4.82
50	6	"Operation Red Rabbit"	LeVar Burton	Amy Rutberg & Mike Diaz	April 1, 2024	HAW306	4.98
51	7	"The Next Thousand"	Daniela Ruah	Matt Bosack & Jan Nash & Christopher Silber	April 15, 2024	HAW307	5.40
52	8	"Into Thin Air"	Sherman Shelton	Ron McGee & Megan Bacharach	April 22, 2024	HAW308	5.12
53	9	"Spill the Tea"	LeVar Burton	Ron McGee & Megan Bacharach	April 29, 2024	HAW309	5.07
54	10	"Divided We Conquer"	Christine Moore	Yalun Tu & Megan Bacharach	May 6, 2024	HAW310	5.41

== Ratings ==
NCIS: Hawaiʻi : U.S. viewers per episode (millions)

Season	Episode number																					
Season	1	2	3	4	5	6	7	8	9	10	11	12	13	14	15	16	17	18	19	20	21	22
1	6.59	5.54	5.54	5.29	5.35	5.07	5.11	5.02	5.16	4.91	5.01	9.79	5.41	4.54	5.38	5.10	5.07	6.13	5.09	5.21	4.97	5.47
2	5.31	4.58	4.91	4.57	4.96	5.01	4.78	4.82	4.52	7.36	4.33	5.27	5.13	5.01	5.12	5.15	4.98	5.02	4.84	4.84	4.95	5.10
3	5.55	5.06	5.40	5.40	4.82	4.98	5.40	5.12	5.06	5.41	–											

Audience measurement performed by Nielsen Media Research

== See also ==
- NCIS (franchise)
- List of Hawaii Five-0 episodes
- List of NCIS episodes
- List of NCIS: Los Angeles episodes
- List of NCIS: New Orleans episodes
