= List of NCIS: New Orleans episodes =

NCIS: New Orleans is an American television series that premiered on CBS on September 23, 2014. The series is set in New Orleans, Louisiana, and follows the stories of the members of the local office of the Naval Criminal Investigative Service (NCIS). The program and its characters were introduced in a two-part episode during the eleventh season of the television series NCIS on March 25 and April 1, 2014. NCIS: New Orleans was renewed for a sixth season on April 22, 2019, which premiered on September 24, 2019. On May 6, 2020, NCIS: New Orleans was renewed for the seventh season, which premiered on November 8, 2020. On February 17, 2021, it was announced that the seventh season would be the series' final season.

During the course of the series, 155 episodes of NCIS: New Orleans aired, concluding on May 23, 2021.

== Series overview ==
Season	Episodes	Originally released	
Season	Episodes	First released	Last released
Intro	2	March 25, 2014	April 1, 2014
1	23	September 23, 2014	May 12, 2015
2	24	September 22, 2015	May 17, 2016
3	24	September 20, 2016	May 16, 2017
4	24	September 26, 2017	May 15, 2018
5	24	September 25, 2018	May 14, 2019
6	20	September 24, 2019	April 19, 2020
7	16	November 8, 2020	May 23, 2021

== Episodes ==
=== Introductory episodes ===
The program and its characters are introduced during the eleventh season of NCIS. The NCIS episodes, "Crescent City (Part I)" and "Crescent City (Part II)", served as backdoor pilot episodes for the show. These episodes are included in the NCIS Season 11 DVD set. In the UK the two episodes were screened on Channel 5 as a feature-length premiere episode of NCIS: New Orleans.

Introductory episodes (NCIS season 11)
No. overall	No. in season	Title	Directed by	Written by	Original release date	Prod. code	US viewers (millions)
252	18	"Crescent City (Part I)"	James Whitmore Jr.	Gary Glasberg	March 25, 2014	1118	17.52
A Congressman is found murdered in New Orleans, Gibbs and his team join forces with Fornell's FBI team and the local NCIS field office. Gibbs reunites with long-time compatriot and friend NCIS Special Agent Dwayne "King" Pride. With that, Gibbs and Eleanor Bishop head to New Orleans while DiNozzo and McGee stay in D.C. to work the case with Fornell. Things soon become personal as the Congressman was a former NCIS agent and their contemporary and his murder could possibly be linked to one of their old cases. The episode ends with Gibbs, Pride and Agents Meredith Brody and Christopher LaSalle standing in a square while, from a hotel room, the unrevealed killer begins taking surveillance photographs of the NCIS team as Gibbs and Pride look on.
253	19	"Crescent City (Part II)"	Tony Wharmby	Gary Glasberg	April 1, 2014	1119	17.16
Another victim is found in the wetlands, dead at least two weeks. His throat had been cut with a steel blade and jet fuel is found in tire tracks near his body. Abby calls Gibbs to say the jet fuel matched the fuel found on the car mats belonging to victim Agent Doyle. A suspect, believed to have been obsessed with Congressman McLane and the Privileged Killer case, is also found dead. Gibbs and Pride track the killer, the son of a McClane contributor, Spencer Hanlon to a military bar and a nearby cemetery, after Gibbs recalls marble dust also being found in Doyle's car. Gibbs and Pride later kill Hanlon who is in the process of attempting to murder Petty Officer Carla Meade. After solving this case, Pride and his team receive another one while Gibbs waits for Bishop in order to return home while Meredith Brody eventually becomes a permanent member of the NCIS New Orleans team.

=== Season 1 (2014–15) ===
No. overall	No. in season	Title	Directed by	Written by	Original release date	Prod. code	U.S. viewers (millions)
1	1	"Musician Heal Thyself"	Michael Zinberg	Jeffrey Lieber	September 23, 2014	NO101	17.22
2	2	"Carrier"	James Whitmore Jr.	Gary Glasberg	September 30, 2014	NO103	16.57
3	3	"Breaking Brig"	Tony Wharmby	Laurie Arent	October 7, 2014	NO104	15.41
4	4	"The Recruits"	Oz Scott	Sam Humphrey	October 14, 2014	NO105	16.14
5	5	"It Happened Last Night"	Arvin Brown	Jack Bernstein	October 21, 2014	NO102	16.13
6	6	"Master of Horror"	Terrence O'Hara	Scott D. Shapiro	October 28, 2014	NO106	16.09
7	7	"Watch Over Me"	James Hayman	David Appelbaum	November 11, 2014	NO107	14.99
8	8	"Love Hurts"	Michael Pressman	Jack Bernstein	November 18, 2014	NO108	16.86
9	9	"Chasing Ghosts"	James Whitmore Jr.	Jonathan I. Kidd & Sonya Winton	November 25, 2014	NO109	14.47
10	10	"Stolen Valor"	Dennis Smith	Laurie Arent	December 16, 2014	NO110	14.14
11	11	"Baitfish"	Leslie Libman	Teleplay by : Jeffrey Lieber; Story by : Jeffrey Lieber & Jeremiah Tash	January 6, 2015	NO111	17.73
12	12	"The Abyss"	Terrence O'Hara	Sam Humphrey	January 13, 2015	NO112	16.39
13	13	"The Walking Dead"	Edward Ornelas	David Appelbaum	February 3, 2015	NO113	16.52
14	14	"Careful What You Wish For"	James Hayman	Scott D. Shapiro	February 10, 2015	NO114	16.19
15	15	"Le Carnaval de la Mort"	Tony Wharmby	Jonathan I. Kidd & Sonya Winton	February 17, 2015	NO115	14.70
16	16	"My Brother's Keeper"	Oz Scott	Teleplay by : Christopher Ambrose; Story by : Christopher Ambrose & Jonathan I. Kidd & Sonya Winton	February 24, 2015	NO116	13.71
17	17	"More Now"	Bethany Rooney	Christopher Silber	March 10, 2015	NO117	12.61
18	18	"The List"	Michael Zinberg	Laurie Arent	March 24, 2015	NO118	14.42
19	19	"The Insider"	James Whitmore Jr.	David Appelbaum & Scott D. Shapiro	April 7, 2015	NO119	14.33
20	20	"Rock-a-Bye-Baby"	Elodie Keene	Jonathan I. Kidd & Sonya Winton	April 14, 2015	NO120	14.40
21	21	"You'll Do"	Alrick Riley	Sam Humphrey	April 28, 2015	NO121	14.55
22	22	"How Much Pain Can You Take?"	Terrence O'Hara	Christopher Ambrose & Christopher Silber	May 5, 2015	NO122	13.35
23	23	"My City"	James Hayman	Teleplay by : Jeffrey Lieber; Story by : Jeffrey Lieber & Zach Strauss	May 12, 2015	NO123	13.61

=== Season 2 (2015–16) ===
No. overall	No. in season	Title	Directed by	Written by	Original release date	Prod. code	U.S. viewers (millions)
24	1	"Sic Semper Tyrannis"	James Whitmore Jr.	Jeffrey Lieber	September 22, 2015	NO201	12.62
25	2	"Shadow Unit"	James Hayman	Christopher Silber	September 29, 2015	NO202	12.86
26	3	"Touched by the Sun"	Edward Ornelas	Laurie Arent	October 6, 2015	NO203	14.18
27	4	"I Do"	Tony Wharmby	Sam Humphrey	October 13, 2015	NO204	12.47
28	5	"Foreign Affairs"	Laura Belsey	Sanford Golden & Karen Wyscarver	October 20, 2015	NO205	12.99
29	6	"Insane in the Membrane"	Leslie Libman	David Appelbaum	October 27, 2015	NO206	13.06
30	7	"Broken Hearted"	Elodie Keene	Zach Strauss & Greta Heinemann	November 3, 2015	NO207	14.15
31	8	"Confluence"	Edward Ornelas	Teleplay by : Jeffrey Lieber; Story by : Jeffrey Lieber & Katherine Beattie	November 10, 2015	NO208	12.39
32	9	"Darkest Hour"	Michael Zinberg	Laurie Arent	November 17, 2015	NO209	13.01
33	10	"Billy and the Kid"	Mary Lou Belli	Sam Humphrey	November 24, 2015	NO210	11.85
34	11	"Blue Christmas"	Tony Wharmby	Zach Strauss	December 15, 2015	NO211	12.09
35	12	"Sister City, Part II"	James Hayman	Christopher Silber	January 5, 2016	NO212	17.25
36	13	"Undocumented"	Frederick E.O. Toye	David Appelbaum	January 19, 2016	NO213	13.30
37	14	"Father's Day"	Dennis Smith	Sam Humphrey	February 9, 2016	NO215	12.57
38	15	"No Man's Land"	James Whitmore Jr.	Cathryn Humphris	February 16, 2016	NO214	13.41
39	16	"Second Chances"	Tessa Blake	Zach Strauss	February 23, 2016	NO216	12.60
40	17	"Radio Silence"	Michael Zinberg	Laurie Arent & Greta Heinemann	March 1, 2016	NO217	11.72
41	18	"If It Bleeds, It Leads"	Bethany Rooney	David Appelbaum	March 15, 2016	NO218	11.97
42	19	"Means to an End"	Alrick Riley	Christopher Silber	March 22, 2016	NO219	13.38
43	20	"Second Line"	Tony Wharmby	Nancylee Myatt	April 5, 2016	NO220	12.28
44	21	"Collateral Damage"	James Whitmore Jr.	Cathryn Humphris	April 19, 2016	NO221	12.22
45	22	"Help Wanted"	Terrence O'Hara	Sam Humphrey	May 3, 2016	NO222	12.56
46	23	"The Third Man"	Bethany Rooney	David Appelbaum & Zach Strauss	May 10, 2016	NO223	13.24
47	24	"Sleeping with the Enemy"	James Hayman	Christopher Silber	May 17, 2016	NO224	13.30

=== Season 3 (2016–17) ===
No. overall	No. in season	Title	Directed by	Written by	Original release date	Prod. code	U.S. viewers (millions)
48	1	"Aftershocks"	James Hayman	Brad Kern	September 20, 2016	NO301	11.12
49	2	"Suspicious Minds"	Michael Zinberg	Christopher Silber	September 27, 2016	NO302	10.76
50	3	"Man on Fire"	Rob Morrow	Zach Strauss	October 11, 2016	NO303	9.62
51	4	"Escape Plan"	James Whitmore Jr.	David Appelbaum	October 18, 2016	NO304	9.53
52	5	"Course Correction"	Tony Wharmby	Teleplay by : Chad Gomez Creasey; Story by : Cathryn Humphris & Chad Gomez Creasey	October 25, 2016	NO305	9.62
53	6	"One Good Man"	Rob J. Greenlea	Gwendolyn M. Parker	November 15, 2016	NO306	9.17
54	7	"Outlaws"	Mary Lou Belli	Greta Heinemann	November 22, 2016	NO307	8.50
55	8	"Music to My Ears"	Michael Zinberg	Kate Sargeant Curtis	December 6, 2016	NO308	9.36
56	9	"Overdrive"	Gordon Lonsdale	Ron McGee	December 13, 2016	NO309	10.01
57	10	"Follow the Money"	Stacey K. Black	Christopher Silber	January 3, 2017	NO310	9.62
58	11	"Let It Ride"	Nina Lopez-Corrado	Brad Kern & Taylor Streitz	January 17, 2017	NO311	9.33
59	12	"Hell on the High Water"	Michael Zinberg	Zach Strauss	January 24, 2017	NO312	9.18
60	13	"Return of the King"	James Hayman	David Appelbaum	February 7, 2017	NO313	9.01
61	14	"Pandora's Box, Part II"	LeVar Burton	Christopher Silber	February 14, 2017	NO316	10.32
62	15	"End of the Line"	Edward Ornelas	Chad Gomez Creasey	February 21, 2017	NO314	9.58
63	16	"The Last Stand"	Sharat Raju	Greta Heinemann	March 7, 2017	NO315	9.06
64	17	"Swift, Silent, Deadly"	Randy Zisk	Ron McGee	March 14, 2017	NO317	10.43
65	18	"Slay the Dragon"	Mary Lou Belli	Kate Sargeant Curtis	March 14, 2017	NO318	10.43
66	19	"Quid Pro Quo"	Alex Zakrzewski	Zach Strauss	March 28, 2017	NO319	9.17
67	20	"NOLA Confidential"	Geary McLeod	David Appelbaum & Taylor Streitz	April 4, 2017	NO320	8.88
68	21	"Krewe"	Tony Wharmby	Judith McCreary	April 18, 2017	NO321	10.16
69	22	"Knockout"	Gordon Lonsdale	Chad Gomez Creasey & Greta Heinemann	May 2, 2017	NO322	8.69
70	23	"Down the Rabbit Hole"	Edward Ornelas	Brad Kern	May 9, 2017	NO323	9.02
71	24	"Poetic Justice"	James Hayman	Teleplay by : Christopher Silber; Story by : Christopher Silber & Katherine Beattie	May 16, 2017	NO324	9.22

=== Season 4 (2017–18) ===
No. overall	No. in season	Title	Directed by	Written by	Original release date	Prod. code	U.S. viewers (millions)
72	1	"Rogue Nation"	James Hayman	Brad Kern	September 26, 2017	NO401	8.78
73	2	"#1 Fan"	Hart Bochner	Zach Strauss	October 3, 2017	NO326	9.23
74	3	"The Asset"	Tony Wharmby	Christopher Silber	October 10, 2017	NO402	9.52
75	4	"Dead Man Calling"	Michael Zinberg	Greta Heinemann	October 17, 2017	NO403	9.54
76	5	"Viral"	LeVar Burton	Chad Gomez Creasey	October 24, 2017	NO404	9.52
77	6	"Acceptable Loss"	Mary Lou Belli	Brooke Roberts	October 31, 2017	NO405	8.86
78	7	"The Accident"	LeVar Burton	Teleplay by : Ron McGee; Story by : Ron McGee & Michael Gemballa	November 7, 2017	NO325	9.22
79	8	"Sins of the Father"	James Whitmore Jr.	Paul Guyot	November 14, 2017	NO406	9.67
80	9	"Hard Knock Life"	Deborah Reinisch	Talicia Raggs	November 21, 2017	NO407	7.99
81	10	"Mirror, Mirror"	Geary McLeod	Brad Kern & Lynne E. Litt	December 12, 2017	NO408	8.21
82	11	"Monster"	Rob Greenlea	Christopher Silber	January 2, 2018	NO409	9.10
83	12	"Identity Crisis"	Gordon Lonsdale	Taylor Streitz	January 9, 2018	NO410	8.70
84	13	"Ties That Bind"	James Hayman	Ron McGee & Katherine Beattie	January 23, 2018	NO411	9.30
85	14	"A New Dawn"	Michael Zinberg	Greta Heinemann	February 6, 2018	NO412	8.38
86	15	"The Last Mile"	Stacey K. Black	Chad Gomez Creasey	February 27, 2018	NO413	8.26
87	16	"Empathy"	Tessa Blake	Paul Guyot	March 6, 2018	NO414	8.44
88	17	"Treasure Hunt"	Tony Wharmby	Brooke Roberts	March 13, 2018	NO415	9.25
89	18	"Welcome to the Jungle"	James Whitmore Jr.	Christopher Silber & Austin Badgett	March 27, 2018	NO416	8.53
90	19	"High Stakes"	LeVar Burton	Ron McGee	April 3, 2018	NO417	8.43
91	20	"Powder Keg"	Mary Lou Belli	Talicia Raggs	April 17, 2018	NO418	8.46
92	21	"Mind Games"	Gordon Lonsdale	Greta Heinemann & Taylor Streitz	May 1, 2018	NO419	8.13
93	22	"The Assassination of Dwayne Pride"	Edward Ornelas	Teleplay by : Ron McGee & Katherine Beattie; Story by : Chad Gomez Creasey & Katherine Beattie	May 8, 2018	NO420	8.11
94	23	"Checkmate"	James Hayman	Brad Kern	May 15, 2018	NO421	9.44
95	24	"Checkmate"	James Whitmore Jr.	Christopher Silber	May 15, 2018	NO422	9.44

=== Season 5 (2018–19) ===
No. overall	No. in season	Title	Directed by	Written by	Original release date	Prod. code	U.S. viewers (millions)
96	1	"See You Soon"	James Hayman	Christopher Silber	September 25, 2018	NO501	8.97
97	2	"Inside Out"	Edward Ornelas	Adam Targum	October 2, 2018	NO502	7.84
98	3	"Diplomatic Immunity"	Gordon Lonsdale	Greta Heinemann & Rob Kerkovich	October 9, 2018	NO503	7.91
99	4	"Legacy"	LeVar Burton	Chad Gomez Creasey	October 16, 2018	NO504	7.20
100	5	"In the Blood"	James Whitmore Jr.	Ron McGee	October 23, 2018	NO505	7.12
101	6	"Pound of Flesh"	Hart Bochner	Talicia Raggs	October 30, 2018	NO506	7.56
102	7	"Sheepdogs"	Michael Zinberg	Brooke Roberts	November 13, 2018	NO507	7.58
103	8	"Close to Home"	Tony Wharmby	Katherine Beattie	November 20, 2018	NO508	7.47
104	9	"Risk Assessment"	Tessa Blake	Elizabeth Rinehart	December 4, 2018	NO509	8.33
105	10	"Tick Tock"	Stacey K. Black	Christopher Silber	December 11, 2018	NO510	7.76
106	11	"Vindicta"	James Hayman	Adam Targum	January 15, 2019	NO511	7.29
107	12	"Desperate Navy Wives"	Michael Zinberg	Chad Gomez Creasey	January 22, 2019	NO512	6.70
108	13	"X"	Mary Lou Belli	Greta Heinemann	February 12, 2019	NO513	7.16
109	14	"Conspiracy Theories"	Tessa Blake	Ron McGee	February 19, 2019	NO514	7.03
110	15	"Crab Mentality"	Stacey K. Black	Brooke Roberts	February 26, 2019	NO515	7.19
111	16	"Survivor"	James Whitmore Jr.	Cameron Dupuy & Sydney Mitchel	March 12, 2019	NO516	6.98
112	17	"Reckoning"	Gordon Lonsdale	Christopher Silber & Adam Targum	March 26, 2019	NO517	7.18
113	18	"In Plain Sight"	LeVar Burton	Katherine Beattie	April 2, 2019	NO518	7.19
114	19	"A House Divided"	Deborah Reinisch	Elizabeth Rinehart	April 9, 2019	NO519	6.69
115	20	"Jackpot"	Mary Lou Belli	Talicia Raggs	April 16, 2019	NO520	6.54
116	21	"Trust Me"	Jen Derwingson-Peacock	Austin Badgett & Ron McGee	April 23, 2019	NO521	6.46
117	22	"Chaos Theory"	Edward Ornelas	Brooke Roberts	April 30, 2019	NO522	7.16
118	23	"The River Styx"	James Hayman	Chad Gomez Creasey	May 7, 2019	NO523	6.68
119	24	"The River Styx"	James Whitmore Jr.	Christopher Silber	May 14, 2019	NO524	6.93

=== Season 6 (2019–20) ===
No. overall	No. in season	Title	Directed by	Written by	Original release date	Prod. code	U.S. viewers (millions)
120	1	"Judgement Call"	James Hayman	Christopher Silber	September 24, 2019	NO601	6.66
121	2	"The Terminator Conundrum"	Edward Ornelas	Jan Nash	October 1, 2019	NO602	6.90
122	3	"Bad Apple"	Stacey K. Black	Ron McGee	October 8, 2019	NO603	6.69
123	4	"Overlooked"	Gordon Lonsdale	Stephanie Sengupta	October 15, 2019	NO604	6.57
124	5	"Spies & Lies"	LeVar Burton	Brooke Roberts	October 22, 2019	NO605	6.64
125	6	"Matthew 5:9"	Michael Zinberg	Chad Gomez Creasey	November 5, 2019	NO606	6.61
126	7	"Boom-Boom-Boom-Boom"	Mary Lou Belli	Talicia Raggs	November 12, 2019	NO607	6.41
127	8	"The Order of the Mongoose"	Rob Greenlea	Katherine Beattie	November 19, 2019	NO608	6.89
128	9	"Convicted"	Hart Bochner	Jan Nash & Christopher Silber	November 26, 2019	NO609	6.87
129	10	"Requital"	Michael Zinberg	Jan Nash & Christopher Silber	December 17, 2019	NO610	7.05
130	11	"Bad Moon Rising"	Lionel Coleman	Ron McGee	February 16, 2020	NO611	5.24
131	12	"Waiting for Monroe"	James Whitmore Jr.	Sydney Mitchel	February 23, 2020	NO612	5.59
132	13	"The Root of All Evil"	Tessa Blake	Stephanie Sengupta & Corey Moore	March 1, 2020	NO613	5.56
133	14	"The Man in the Red Suit"	James Hayman	Chad Gomez Creasey & Jan Nash	March 8, 2020	NO614	5.62
134	15	"Relentless"	Gordon Lonsdale	Cameron Dupuy	March 15, 2020	NO615	6.35
135	16	"Pride and Prejudice"	Hart Bochner	Brooke Roberts	March 15, 2020	NO616	5.83
136	17	"Biased"	LeVar Burton	Talicia Raggs	March 22, 2020	NO617	6.39
137	18	"A Changed Woman"	Mary Lou Belli	Katherine Beattie	March 29, 2020	NO618	6.50
138	19	"Monolith"	Diana Valentine	Chad Gomez Creasey & Sydney Mitchel	April 12, 2020	NO619	5.88
139	20	"Predators"	Gordon Lonsdale	Stephanie Sengupta	April 19, 2020	NO620	6.24

=== Season 7 (2020–21) ===
No. overall	No. in season	Title	Directed by	Written by	Original release date	Prod. code	U.S. viewers (millions)
140	1	"Something in the Air, Part I"	James Whitmore Jr.	Jan Nash & Christopher Silber	November 8, 2020	NO701	4.65
141	2	"Something in the Air, Part II"	James Whitmore Jr.	Jan Nash & Christopher Silber	November 15, 2020	NO702	4.71
142	3	"One of Our Own"	Hart Bochner	Ron McGee	November 22, 2020	NO703	4.90
143	4	"We All Fall..."	Hart Bochner	Talicia Raggs	December 13, 2020	NO704	5.17
144	5	"Operation Drano, Part I"	LeVar Burton	Chad Gomez Creasey	January 3, 2021	NO705	4.54
145	6	"Operation Drano, Part II"	LeVar Burton	Katherine Beattie	January 10, 2021	NO706	4.67
146	7	"Leda and the Swan, Part I"	Diana C. Valentine	Stephanie Sengupta	January 17, 2021	NO707	5.07
147	8	"Leda and the Swan, Part II"	Diana C. Valentine	Sydney Mitchel	February 14, 2021	NO708	5.00
148	9	"Into Thin Air"	Tim Andrew	Cameron Dupuy	February 21, 2021	NO709	4.93
149	10	"Homeward Bound"	Hart Bochner	Katherine Beattie & Jack Maron	February 28, 2021	NO710	5.03
150	11	"Stashed"	Sherman Shelton, Jr.	Talicia Riggs & Adam Lazarre-White	March 28, 2021	NO711	4.86
151	12	"Once Upon a Time"	Rob Greenlea	Jan Nash & Ron McGee	April 4, 2021	NO712	4.63
152	13	"Choices"	Lionel Coleman	Chad Gomez Creasey & Christopher Silber	May 2, 2021	NO713	4.79
153	14	"Illusions"	Rob Greenlea	Stephanie Sengupta & Megan Bacharach	May 9, 2021	NO714	4.96
154	15	"Runs in the Family"	Mary Lou Belli	Ron McGee & Stephanie Sengupta	May 16, 2021	NO715	4.98
155	16	"Laissez Les Bons Temps Rouler"	Tim Andrew	Chad Gomez Creasey & Ron McGee & Stephanie Sengupta	May 23, 2021	NO716	5.18

== Ratings ==
NCIS: New Orleans : U.S. viewers per episode (millions)

Season	Episode number																							
Season	1	2	3	4	5	6	7	8	9	10	11	12	13	14	15	16	17	18	19	20	21	22	23	24
1	17.22	16.57	15.41	16.14	16.13	16.09	14.99	16.86	14.47	14.14	17.73	16.39	16.52	16.19	14.70	13.71	12.61	14.42	14.33	14.40	14.55	13.35	13.61	–
2	12.62	12.86	14.18	12.47	12.99	13.06	14.15	12.39	13.01	11.85	12.09	17.25	13.30	12.57	13.41	12.60	11.72	11.97	13.38	12.28	12.22	12.56	13.24	13.30
3	11.12	10.76	9.62	9.53	9.62	9.17	8.50	9.36	10.01	9.62	9.33	9.18	9.01	10.32	9.58	9.06	10.43	10.43	9.17	8.88	10.16	8.69	9.02	9.22
4	8.78	9.23	9.52	9.54	9.52	8.86	9.22	9.67	7.99	8.21	9.10	8.70	9.30	8.38	8.26	8.44	9.25	8.53	8.43	8.46	8.13	8.11	9.44	9.44
5	8.97	7.84	7.91	7.20	7.12	7.56	7.58	7.47	8.33	7.76	7.29	6.70	7.16	7.03	7.19	6.93	7.18	7.19	6.69	6.54	6.46	7.16	6.68	6.93
6	6.66	6.90	6.69	6.57	6.64	6.61	6.41	6.89	6.87	7.05	5.24	5.59	5.56	5.62	6.35	5.83	6.39	6.50	5.88	6.24	–			
7	4.65	4.71	4.90	5.17	4.54	4.67	5.07	5.00	4.93	5.03	4.86	4.63	4.79	4.96	4.98	5.18	–							

Audience measurement performed by Nielsen Media Research

== Home media ==
Season	Episodes	DVD release dates			
Season	Episodes	Region 1	Region 2	Region 4	Discs
Pilot	24	August 18, 2015	February 8, 2016	November 12, 2015	6
1	24	August 18, 2015	February 8, 2016	November 12, 2015	6
2	24	August 9, 2016	February 20, 2017	September 29, 2016	6
3	24	August 15, 2017	January 21, 2019	November 15, 2017	6
4	24	August 14, 2018	June 17, 2019	October 31, 2018	6
5	24	August 20, 2019	March 9, 2020	September 25, 2019	6
6	20	August 11, 2020	TBA	TBA	5
7	16	August 31, 2021	TBA	TBA	4

== See also ==
- NCIS (franchise)
- List of NCIS episodes
- List of NCIS: Los Angeles episodes
- List of Hawaii Five-0 episodes
- List of NCIS: Hawaiʻi episodes
