= Daniel Bellomy =

American actor

- Born: December 27, 1994 (age 31)
- Occupation: Actor
- Years active: 2013–present

Daniel Bellomy (born December 27, 1994) is an American actor. He is best known for playing Ezekiel Cross in the crime drama series Power Book II: Ghost and Special Agent Herman Daniels in the crime drama series NCIS: Origins.

== Early life ==
Bellomy is from Detroit, Michigan. He is a graduate of Carnegie Mellon University’s BFA Drama program in Pittsburgh .

== Career ==
One of his first roles was portraying basketball legend Kevin Durant in the biographical film of his mother The Wanda Durant Story. He has had appearances in mant tv shows such as The Deuce, Suits, Blue Bloods and The Good Fight. His biggest role so far has been playing Ezekiel Cross in the crime drama series Power Book II: Ghost. He played the recurring role of Special Agent Herman Daniels in the crime drama series NCIS: Origins.

== Filmography ==
=== Film ===
Year	Title	Role	Notes
2013	A Matter of Time	Sheriff Sullivan Gridley	Short
2014	ABC Discovers: Los Angeles Talent Showcase	Himself	Short
2016	The Real MVP: The Wanda Durant Story	Kevin Durant	
2017	Freak Show	Bo-Bo	
2018	Paint	Austin Gamby	

=== Television ===
Year	Title	Role	Notes
2017	The Deuce	Man	Episode: "What Kind of Bad?"
2018	Outcast	Choir Director	Episode: "I Can't Be in a Black Musical"
2019	Suits	Jeremy Wall	Episode: "If the Shoe Fits"
2021	Blue Bloods	Warren Pratt	Episode: "The New Normal"
2021	The Good Fight	Levi	Episode: "And the Violence Spread"
2023	FBI: International	Bryan Moncrief	Episode: "BHITW"
2020-2024	Power Book II: Ghost	Ezekiel Cross	21 episodes
2024	American Sports Story	Brandon Spikes	2 episodes
2024-2026	NCIS: Origins	Herman "Herm" Daniels	15 episodes
