= NCIS (video game) =

2011 video game

- North American cover art
- Developer: Ubisoft Shanghai
- Publisher: Ubisoft
- Series: NCIS
- Platforms: PlayStation 3, Wii, Microsoft Windows, Xbox 360, Nintendo 3DS
- Release: AU: October 27, 2011; EU: October 28, 2011; NA: November 1, 2011; NA: September 18, 2012 (3DS)
- Genre: Adventure
- Mode: Single-player

NCIS is an adventure game developed by Ubisoft Shanghai and published by Ubisoft for Nintendo 3DS (as NCIS 3D), PlayStation 3, Wii, Microsoft Windows and Xbox 360 in 2011. It is based on the NCIS TV series. The game was announced on September 21, 2011.

== Plot ==
The game is divided up into four self-contained episodes but features an overarching plot that connects them all. The game begins with a murder in a casino that turns into a larger plot involving terrorists. The game takes place in locations like Atlantic City, Iraq, and Dubai.

== Gameplay ==
The player controls six investigators from the Naval Criminal Investigative Service from a third-person perspective. With the exception of assistant medical examiner Jimmy Palmer, all the main characters from the TV show are included. At crime scenes, the gameplay involves the player taking pictures, moving furniture and cracking safes. In Abby's lab, the player identifies evidence and analyzes chemicals. Using the office computer, the player can hack into phone records and emails, or use a satellite to track down criminals.

== Reception ==
Reception

Aggregate score
Aggregator	Score
Metacritic	(PS3) 50/100 (X360) 35/100

Review scores
Publication	Score
Adventure Gamers	(PC) 2/5
Destructoid	(X360) 6.5/10
GamesMaster	(X360) 34%
GameSpot	(X360) 2/10
IGN	(PS3) 4.5/10 (X360) 4/10
Jeuxvideo.com	(3DS) 12/20
NGamer	(3DS) 40%
PlayStation Official Magazine – Australia	(PS3) 50%
Official Xbox Magazine (UK)	(X360) 4/10
Official Xbox Magazine (US)	(X360) 3/10
Common Sense Media	1/5
Digital Spy	(X360) 2/5

The PlayStation 3 version received "mixed" reviews, while the Xbox 360 version received "unfavorable" reviews, according to the review aggregation website Metacritic.

Adventure Gamers said "At best this is a bit of diverting fun to pass the time, and should offer a few smiles if you can stick it out to the underwhelming ending." In what is a backhanded compliment at best, Destructoid said that "NCIS is the best of Ubisoft's series of licensed forensic adventure games, which admittedly may not mean that much depending on your gaming preferences [...]". IGN summarized: "I can only recommend this game to anyone who bleeds NCIS love from their veins or lives on trophies; for everyone else it's just not worth the time."
