= NCIS season 23 =

NCIS
- Season 23
- Season 23 U.S. DVD cover
- Starring: Sean Murray; Wilmer Valderrama; Katrina Law; Brian Dietzen; Diona Reasonover; Rocky Carroll; Gary Cole
- No. of episodes: 20

Release
- Original network: CBS
- Original release: October 14, 2025 – May 12, 2026

Season chronology
- ← Previous; Season 22 Next → Season 24

The twenty-third season of NCIS was announced on February 20, 2025 by CBS. It premiered on October 14, 2025, it concluded on May 12, 2026, and contained 20 episodes. On January 22, 2026, the series was renewed for a 24th season. This season also includes the series' 500th episode as well as Wilmer Valderrama’s 200th episode.

This is the final season to feature Rocky Carroll as series regular.

== Premise ==
NCIS revolves around a fictional team of special agents from the Naval Criminal Investigative Service, which conducts criminal investigations involving the United States Navy and Marine Corps. Based at the Washington Navy Yard in Washington, D.C., the NCIS team is led by Supervisory Special Agent Alden Parker, an ex-FBI Special Agent and a skilled investigator.

== Cast and characters ==
=== Main ===
- Sean Murray as Timothy McGee, NCIS Senior Special Agent, Second in Command of the Major Case Response Team (MCRT) assigned to Washington's Navy Yard
- Wilmer Valderrama as Nick Torres, NCIS Special Agent
- Katrina Law as Jessica Knight, NCIS Special Agent
- Brian Dietzen as Dr. Jimmy Palmer, Chief Medical Examiner for NCIS
- Diona Reasonover as Kasie Hines, Forensic Specialist for NCIS
- Rocky Carroll as Leon Vance, NCIS Director (episodes 1–13, 20)
- Gary Cole as Alden Parker, NCIS Supervisory Special Agent (SSA) of MCRT and former FBI Special Agent

=== Recurring cast ===
- Rebecca De Mornay as Carla Marino, the boss of the Kansas City Mob.
- Zane Holtz as Dale Sawyer, NCIS Special Agent
- Victoria Kelleher as Barbara Dunsley, NCIS Accountant
- Roma Maffia as Vera Strickland, retired NCIS Special Agent
- J. Claude Deering as Curtis Hubley, NCIS Technical Operator
- Patrick Keleher as Mateo Garcia, McGee's son from a previous relationship
- Naomi Grace as Kayla Vance, Leon Vance's daughter and NCIS Agent

=== Crossover ===
==== NCIS: Origins ====
- Bobby Moynihan as Woodrow "Woody" Browne, retired NIS forensic analyst
- Ely Henry as Philip Elertson, retired NIS forensic chemist

=== Special guest star ===
- Emily Wickersham as Eleanor "Ellie" Bishop, former NCIS Special Agent

=== Notable guests ===
- Nancy Travis as Harriet Parker, U.S. Navy Vice Admiral and Parker's sister
- Adam Campbell as Young Donald "Ducky" Mallard
- LL Cool J as Sam Hanna, NCIS Senior Special Agent
- Seamus Dever as Gabriel LaRoche, Associate Attorney General for the Department of Justice and NCIS Deputy Director

== Episodes ==
No. overall	No. in season	Title	Directed by	Written by	Original release date	Prod. code	U.S. viewers (millions)
488	1	"Prodigal Son"	Diana Valentine	Christopher J. Waild	October 14, 2025	2301	5.33
489	2	"Prodigal Son"	James Whitmore Jr.	Christopher J. Waild	October 21, 2025	2302	5.79
Part I: Parker goes to extremes to apprehend Carla Marino, to Vance's objections. Flashbacks show Parker's troubled youth and his estranged sister Harriet (Nancy Travis), now a Navy Vice Admiral, unsuccessfully trying to get him to change his ways. Parker's quest for revenge culminates in him stowing away on the ship Carla is on, and Harriet being forced to give an order to fire a bomb at the ship, realizing at the last second that Parker is on it. Part II: The ship is detonated, but not by Harriet's missile. Marino had put a doppelganger on the ship to fake her death and kidnap her granddaughter to bring her into the crime ring. Parker, who had escaped the ship himself, discreetly works the case at Gibbs' old cabin alongside McGee, while the team works to rescue Marino's granddaughter. Meanwhile, Palmer discovers Marino may not be the only person to see Parker's father on the night he was killed.
490	3	"The Sound and the Fury"	Tawnia McKiernan	Scott Williams	October 28, 2025	2303	5.37
Torres and Knight work with night shift agent Dale Sawyer (Zane Holtz) on a blackmail case, and Torres begins to experience supernatural occurrences.
491	4	"Gone Girls"	Rocky Carroll	Amy Rutberg	November 4, 2025	2304	5.45
The team investigates a Marine suspected of kidnapping the wife of a high-ranking official, and Knight discovers the wife might be a victim of domestic abuse.
492	5	"Now and Then"	José Clemente Hernandez	Marco Schnabel	November 11, 2025	2305	5.63
When an inmate who had three weeks left until parole escapes prison, the team reopens one of Gibbs and Franks' unresolved cases. Meanwhile, the team puts together a time capsule. Note: This episode concludes a crossover event that begins on NCIS: Origins season 2 episode 5.
493	6	"Page-Turner"	Marc Roskin	Sydney Mitchel & Steven D. Binder	November 18, 2025	2306	5.56
While McGee releases a new book under his alias Thom E. Gemcity, the team investigates a murder which intertwines with McGee getting kidnapped by a woman making a desperate attempt to get justice for her deceased son.
494	7	"God Only Knows"	Lee Friedlander	Andrew Bartels	December 2, 2025	2307	6.06
Parker clashes with a priest when the team investigates the death of a Navy SEAL. Meanwhile, Jimmy admits his findings from the investigation into his mother's burial, all adding to Parker's pent-up grief and anger.
495	8	"Stolen Moments"	Diana Valentine	Brian Dietzen & Jesse Stern	December 9, 2025	2308	5.89
The team assists the Secret Service when a man is shot by the vice president's house. Meanwhile, Vance instructs the team to be shadowed by an AI chatbot whose input leads to some tension between Jimmy and the rest of the team.
496	9	"Heaven and Nature"	James Whitmore Jr.	Scott Williams	December 16, 2025	2309	5.57
The team assists Parker in his investigation into his mother's passing, and Parker discovers that his mother (who had been helping a mother and daughter get away from her abusive husband) was murdered by the man, a dirty cop who falsified the report that gave Parker the belief she had perished in a drunk driving incident. Meanwhile, Knight is given her first ELITE task by Vance: track down former NCIS agent Eleanor Bishop, who has since become a wanted fugitive. The episode ends with Bishop observing the team from her car in the distance.
497	10	"Her"	Rocky Carroll	Christopher J. Waild	March 3, 2026	2310	5.31
Knight and NCIS: Elite are tasked with arresting Ellie Bishop after Bishop's cyber team is accused of leaking classified material. Bishop asks her old NCIS colleagues to help prove her innocence. During the case, Torres confronts Bishop on her sudden departure. Cast: Gary Cole does not appear in this episode.
498	11	"Army of One"	Tawnia McKiernan	Amy Rutberg	March 10, 2026	2311	4.89
When an Army major and former informant of Knight's barricades himself in an ammunition storage, he says Knight is the only one he'll answer to. Knight clashes with Army CID over whether or not he committed a murder. Cast: Brian Dietzen does not appear in this episode.
499	12	"In Too Deep"	Michael Zinberg	Marco Schnabel	March 17, 2026	2312	4.95
When a murdered Navy drone pilot brings one of McGee's exes back in his life, he is stunned to discover he has a long-lost son. Meanwhile, while preparing for their weapons recertification exam, Parker confronts Vance for supposedly not having the team's back. Vance reveals he's concerned over the fact the DOD might fold Army CID into NCIS due to budget cuts. Vance later stuns Parker and says NCIS is the agency being shut down.
500	13	"All Good Things"	José Clemente Hernandez	Steven D. Binder	March 24, 2026	2313	5.55
When the son of a Marine that Gibbs once helped comes to NCIS in desperation to aid his sister, the NCIS team, now fractured due to the agency being shut down, reunites off the books. As Vance details the case's timeline to a mysterious individual, he also relays how the agency's history has positively impacted the lives of the public, every member of the team, and himself, despite many personal sacrifices. Vance comes to realize that during the case, he was fatally shot, and the mysterious man is in truth, the late Dr. Mallard (Adam Campbell). Vance also learns that after his death, the team solved the case and NCIS was able to reopen. Accepting his death and that the agency, the team, and his children will all be fine, Vance tearfully reunites with his late wife, Jackie. Cast: Final regular appearance of Rocky Carroll as Leon Vance.
501	14	"Fleeting"	Marc Roskin	Andrew Bartels	March 31, 2026	2314	5.04
During Fleet Week, a stolen MPD squad car case turns fatal after a stabbed sailor is found in the trunk. Meanwhile, the team is still trying to cope with Vance’s death.
502	15	"Knick-Knack"	Kevin Berlandi	Christopher J. Waild	April 7, 2026	2315	5.00
After a Navy captain is murdered on a museum vessel, the team begins a Da Vinci Code style investigation looking for lost treasure that was worth killing for. Cast: Diona Reasonover does not appear in this episode.
503	16	"S.O.S."	Rocky Carroll	Sydney Mitchel & Amy Rutberg	April 14, 2026	2316	4.91
A Navy lieutenant reappears six months after her plane disappeared, and the team discovers the crash wasn't an accident. McGee helps the lieutenant deal with her trauma by telling of the time he was held hostage.
504	17	"Reboot"	Lionel Coleman	Scott Williams	April 21, 2026	2317	5.24
With most of NCIS away and the mainframe shut down for a midnight upgrade, Kasie and a skeleton crew are left in charge of the reboot. Things get dangerous when someone kills a member of the “Tech Trolls.” Sam Hanna, who’s visiting during a flight layover, steps in to help find the murderer. Kasie later says she’s the reason the Tech Troll is dead. Cast: Sean Murray, Wilmer Valderrama and Katrina Law do not appear in this episode.
505	18	"Bad Impressions"	James Whitmore Jr.	Marco Schnabel	April 28, 2026	2318	5.13
Continuing from the last episode, Kasie is framed for murder with her own self-developed biometric program. Sam Hanna helps the team find the real suspect and meets Kasie's ex-girlfriend in the process.
506	19	"Deal with the Devil"	Diana Valentine	Andrew Bartels	May 5, 2026	2319	5.35
As Parker appears for the trial of Wayne Rogers-the corrupt Army CID director who was complicit in the murder of Vance-the team finds out that he has tried to make a deal with the Department of Justice. As Rodgers is put into WITSEC until the deal is approved, things get murky when Harriet Parker appears to have been given sensitive missiles for Venezuelan cartel members with Rogers's help. Rogers escapes and is apprehended with those missiles, but again put into WITSEC after he calls the Department of Justice. As Rogers is being transported by the US Marshals, the team gets news that he was shot dead by a sniper at 4500 ft, which leads them to suspect Gibbs. Harriet visits Parker's home and as he mentions cooking salmon received from Alaska, she suspects him to be complicit in Rogers' death.
507	20	"Sons and Daughters"	José Clemente Hernandez	Christopher J. Waild	May 12, 2026	2320	5.44
Kayla Vance's involvement in a fatal coffee shop bombing investigation is under fire by Gabriel LaRoche, who discovers Leon had been funding it with dirty money. The team discovers the bomber was inspired by a book and the bomber's father attempts to kill the author, but Kayla talks him down. LaRoche drops the investigation and makes plans to become the new Director of NCIS. Meanwhile, McGee's son, Mateo, applies for an internship, but Torres discovers it to be false and confronts him when a gunshot goes off. Cast: Rocky Carroll reappears as Leon Vance in this episode. This episode also marks Wilmer Valderrama’s 200th episode.

== Ratings ==
Viewership and ratings per episode of NCIS season 23
No.	Title	Air date	Rating/share (18–49)	Viewers (millions)	DVR (18–49)	DVR viewers (millions)	Total (18–49)	Total viewers (millions)
1	"Prodigal Son (Part I)"	October 14, 2025	0.3/4	5.33	0.1	1.91	0.4	7.23
2	"Prodigal Son (Part II)"	October 21, 2025	0.3/4	5.79	0.1	1.92	0.4	7.71
3	"The Sound and the Fury"	October 28, 2025	0.3/4	5.37	0.1	1.75	0.4	7.12
4	"Gone Girls"	November 4, 2025	0.3/4	5.45	0.1	1.70	0.4	7.15
5	"Now and Then"	November 11, 2025	0.3/4	5.63	TBD	TBD	TBD	TBD
6	"Page-Turner"	November 18, 2025	0.4/5	5.56	TBD	TBD	TBD	TBD
7	"God Only Knows"	December 2, 2025	0.3/5	6.06	TBD	TBD	TBD	TBD
8	"Stolen Moments"	December 9, 2025	0.3/5	5.89	TBD	TBD	TBD	TBD
9	"Heaven and Nature"	December 16, 2025	0.3/5	5.57	TBD	TBD	TBD	TBD
10	"Her"	March 3, 2026	0.3/4	5.31	TBD	TBD	TBD	TBD
11	"Army of One"	March 10, 2026	0.4/5	4.89	TBD	TBD	TBD	TBD
12	"In Too Deep"	March 17, 2026	0.3/3	4.95	TBD	TBD	TBD	TBD
13	"All Good Things"	March 24, 2026	0.4/5	5.55	TBD	TBD	TBD	TBD
14	"Fleeting"	March 31, 2026	0.3/4	5.04	TBD	TBD	TBD	TBD
15	"Knick Knack"	April 7, 2026	0.3/4	5.00	TBD	TBD	TBD	TBD
16	"S.O.S."	April 14, 2026	0.3/4	4.91	TBD	TBD	TBD	TBD
17	"Reboot"	April 21, 2026	0.3/4	5.24	TBD	TBD	TBD	TBD
18	"Bad Impressions"	April 28, 2026	0.3/4	5.13	TBD	TBD	TBD	TBD
19	"Deal with the Devil"	May 5, 2026	0.4/5	5.35	TBD	TBD	TBD	TBD
20	"Sons and Daughters"	May 12, 2026	0.3/4	5.44	TBD	TBD	TBD	TBD

== Production ==
After the season renewal, CBS revealed that the series would be returning to its original timeslot (held from seasons 1 to 18) on Tuesdays at 8pm, followed by NCIS: Origins and NCIS: Sydney at 9 and 10 p.m. respectively.

On September 4, it was announced a special crossover with the Origins spinoff celebrating U.S. Veterans on November 11, with a case that would span across decades. For this event, both series inverted their programming schedule. Also, Mark Harmon, Roma Maffia and Muse Watson reprised their roles as Leroy Jethro Gibbs, Vera Strickland and Mike Franks for the crossover.

This is the final season to feature Rocky Carroll as NCIS Director Leon Vance after 18 years, as Carroll was written out of the show in this season's 13th episode. However, he reappeared in the season finale for scenes set before his character's death. Carroll stated that while his character has been written off, he will continue to work behind the scenes as a director on the series.
