= Mariel Molino =

American actress (born 1992)

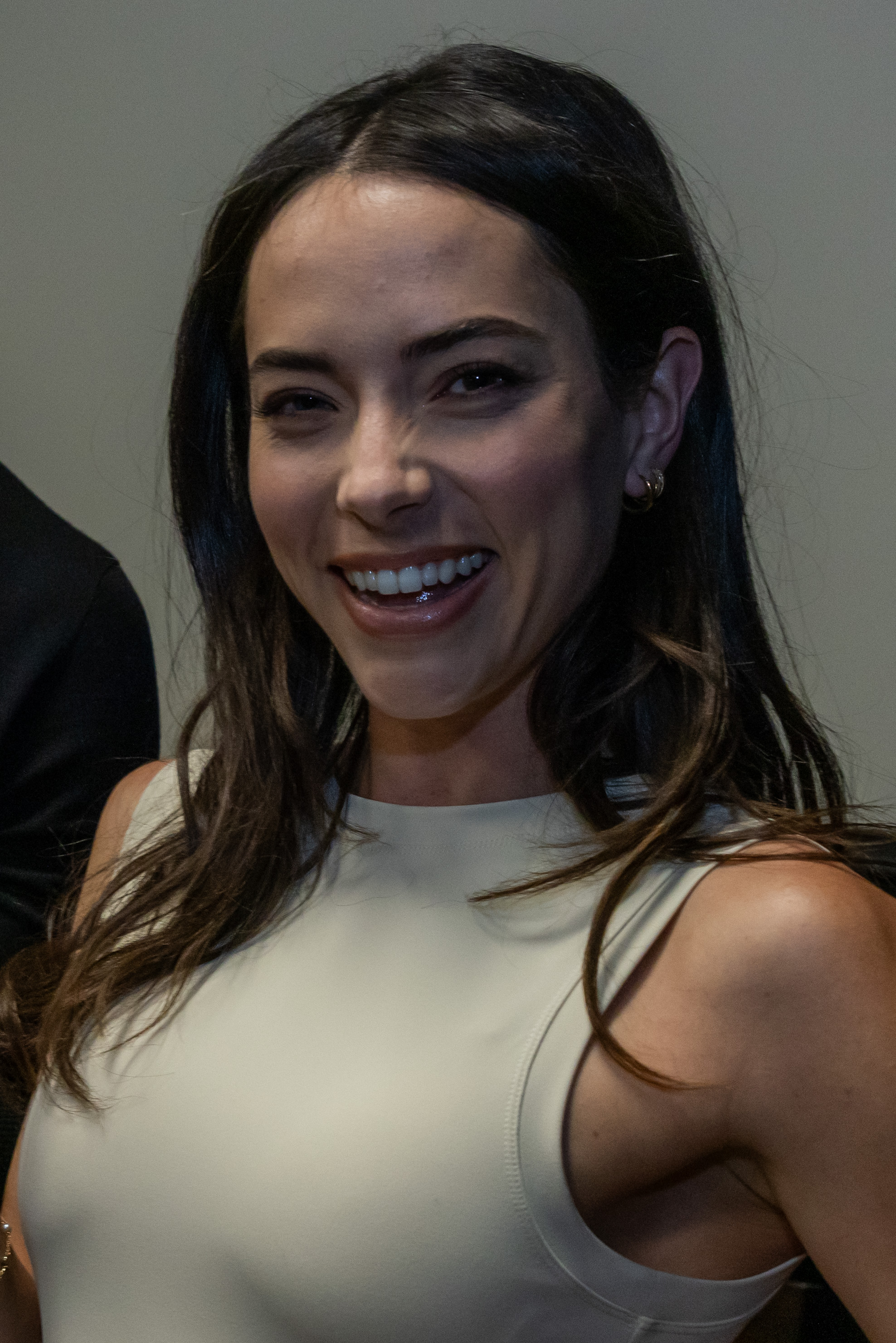
- Molino in 2024
- Born: Mariel Chantal Oberwager; December 18, 1992 (age 33); San Diego, California, U.S.
- Occupation: Actress
- Years active: 2015–present
- Website: marielmolino.com

Mariel Chantal Oberwager, known professionally as Mariel Molino, (born December 18, 1992) is an American actress. She has performed in both Spanish-language and English-language theatrical productions. She starred in Amazon's first original film for Mexico. She was cast in a main role as Agent Lala Dominguez in NCIS: Origins.

== Biography ==
Molino has Mexican and Jewish heritage. Her mother's family has Mexican and Spanish heritage. Her father's parents were Jewish Austrians who fled The Holocaust to Mexico because it had the most affordable travel visas. Her parents moved from Mexico City to San Diego. She has described herself as a "white Latina." She was born in San Diego, California, as the youngest of four, and was raised in Coronado, California. Her earliest stage play appearance was at age 6. An elementary school production of The Wizard of Oz in which she was cast as Crow Number 6, cemented her interest in acting. At The Academy of Our Lady of Peace Molino appeared in school musicals such as Grease and Hairspray. Her father, who supported her creativity, died when she was 15. Among her early television experiences was earning an invitation to a birthday party aired on MTV's My Super Sweet 16, in which she did get some screen time at age 19. Molino did some early modeling jobs. She attended Loyola Marymount University.

Born Mariel Chantal Oberwager, Molino changed her name to honor her Mexican heritage using the name of her family's bakery, El Molino. Her mother's bakery is in Tijuana. Molino and her mother operated it during the COVID-19 pandemic to provide sustenance to its community. In 2021, she split time between San Diego and Mexico City. By the beginning of 2023, she was able to afford to move out of her mom's house. As of 2024, she split time between Los Angeles and Mexico City.

Molino has heterochromia iridum.

== Acting career ==
Molino had to overcome the catch-22 of needing an agent to get work and needing work to get an agent even though her parents both worked full-time limiting her transportation options for Hollywood auditions. The family even endured fraudulent scams in her pursuit. She auditioned for many roles by travelling between San Diego and Los Angeles, eventually landing a spot as an extra on Glee (season 6, March 20, 2015 episode 12, entitled "2009"). She earned her first credits in Spanish language works, including appearances in Muy padres, El juego de las llaves, and La negociadora. When she did her one-line role on Entre correr y vivir donned with a Marilyn Monroe–esque wig, she impressed the producer enough to earn a second (wigless) role on the same episode. She has also appeared on Netflix’s Narcos: Mexico and Luis Miguel: The Series. In November 2020, she starred in the Amazon Prime Video's first original film for Mexico, Locas por el cambio. She has appeared in the main cast of the 2022 ABC series Promised Land, her first American show, and the 2023 Freeform series The Watchful Eye, which was her first thriller genre role. On March 15, it was announced that she was cast as female lead in the role of Agent Lala Dominguez in the original cast of the NCIS 2024 prequel spinoff NCIS: Origins.
