= Caleb Foote =

American actor

- Born: Caleb Martin Foote; December 23, 1993 (age 32); Ypsilanti, Michigan, U.S.
- Occupation: Actor
- Years active: 2015–present

Caleb Martin Foote (born December 23, 1993) is an American actor best known for playing Eddie Cleary in the television series The Kids Are Alright and Special Agent Bernard "Randy" Randolf in NCIS: Origins.

He received the San Diego Theatre Critics Circle 2017 Craig Noel Award for Outstanding Male Performance for his role in Hand to God.

== Biography ==
Foote acted at a young age in various theatre productions. From age 7 to 14, he was raised on Montserrat, a volcanic island in the Caribbean. He attended University of Michigan, where he received a Bachelor of Fine Arts degree in acting in 2016.

Following graduation, Foote appeared in several stage productions, including Luis Valdez' 2017 production of Zoot Suit and the San Diego Repertory Theatre's 2017 production of Hand to God. Critics wrote of Hand to God, "Caleb Foote gives a virtuosic performance, changing his voice and manner (he’s so withdrawn and tic-riddled as Jason, so harsh and antagonistic as Tyrone), while deftly manipulating a puppet with both hands, and discoursing with himself in rapid-fire, angry, funny ways. ... It’s a neck-snapping, challenge, [sic] and it’s thrilling to watch." "Caleb Foote as Jason and Tyrone is remarkable in balancing performances as both the cowering Jason and the aggressive Tyrone. ... there is a marked difference between the two performances. When Jason speaks it is a plea, when Tyrone speaks it is a bark with teeth"; "this is hand puppet Tyrone’s show all the way, which makes this young Foote’s show"; "Foote plays Tyrone, too, with an unearthly way of voicing him that swoops from the guttural to the sing-song. All the while, the actor is also managing Tyrone’s very expressive physical antics while maintaining both sides of conversations between puppet and master. ... It’s an extraordinary performance". For this performance, Foote the San Diego Theatre Critics Circle 2017 Craig Noel Award for Outstanding Male Performance.

== Filmography ==
=== Film and video ===
Year	Title	Role	Notes
2015	Steps	Nick	Short
2016	Present Day	Denny Higgins	Short
2021	A Locker Room Nightmare	MC	Voice
TBA	Amy & Peter Are Getting Divorced	TBA	Post Production

=== Television ===
Year	Title	Role	Notes
2017	Grey's Anatomy	Private #1	1 episode
2017	American Horror Story	Pus Bucket	3 episodes
2018	American Crime Story	Eli	2 episodes
2018	S Is for Revenge	Boris	Episode: "CHAPTER 3"
2018	The Kids Are Alright	Eddie Cleary	Main role, 23 episodes
2019	9-1-1	Officer Andrew Martin	Episode: "Rage"
2019	All Rise	Chad Hill	Episode: "Maricela and the Desert"
2019	NCIS: Los Angeles	Sean Reynolds	Episode: "Kill Beale: Vol. 1"
2020	Magnum P.I.	Dylan	Episode: "Farewell to Love"
2021	Acapulco	Jessie	Episode: "Jessie's Girl"
2021–2022	Made for Love	Bennett Hobbes	Recurring (season 1); main cast (season 2)
2024–present	NCIS: Origins	Special Agent Bernard Randolf	Series regular

== Selected stage appearances ==
Year	Title	Role	Director	Theatre	Refs.
2016	Hansel & Gretel Bluegrass	Hansel	Bryan Davidson	24th Street Theatre; Los Angeles	
2017	Zoot Suit	Tommy	Luis Valdez	Mark Taper Forum; Los Angeles	
2017	Hand to God	Jason / Tyrone	Sam Woodhouse	San Diego Repertory Theatre; San Diego	
