= Tyla Abercrumbie =

American actress, director and playwright

- Born: Chicago, Illinois
- Occupation: Actress
- Years active: 1998–present

Tyla Abercrumbie is an American actress, director and playwright. She is best known for playing Nina Williams in the drama series The Chi and Officer Mary Jo Hayes in the crime series NCIS: Origins.

== Early life ==
Abercrumbie was born in Chicago, Illinois. She described growing up in the Austin neighborhood as joyful despite the city lacking resources and residents struggled. Her older sister encouraged her to express herself through the arts such as writing poetry, encouraging her to read books and then write about them or act them out. She holds a B.A. from Columbia College Chicago.

== Career ==
Early in her career, Abercrumbie took roles in Chicago’s local theater circuit before working in theater and television nationally. Her first big role came playing Nina Johnson in the drama series The Chi. She made guest appearances in the police drama series Detroit 1-8-7 and the crime drama series The Chicago Code. She also has a main role in the crime series NCIS: Origins playing Officer Mary Jo Hayes.

Abercrumbie has participated in theatre productions throughout her career as not only an actress but also a director and playwright. She joined the TimeLine Theatre Playwrights Collective, which nurtured her while she writing and developing her play Relentless, which debuted at the Goodman Theater in 2022. It was originally planned to open in 2020 but was delayed by the Covid-19 pandemic. Set in 1919, it is inspired by people she knew in her Austin community. In 2021, she received a $25,000 grant from Chicago's Raven Theatre to produce a new work.

Asylum (aka Life) is a one woman show written by and starring Abercrumbie early in her career (2003) which portrays the conflicting pressures that a modern woman experiences.

== Filmography ==
=== Film ===
Year	Title	Role	Notes
1998	Fitting Descriptions	Bridge Woman	Short
1998	Placebo Effect	Suit	
1999	Time Served	Brenda's Cellmate	
2008	The Porter	Woman	Short
2008	The Poker House	Janette	
2008	(Mis)Leading Man	Danielle Holland	Short
2015	Unexpected	Ms. Bryant	
2017	My Prom Mom	Tiffany	Short
2018	Animator	Roz	
2020	Dreaming Grand Avenue	Carol	
2023	We Grown Now	Christine	

=== Television ===
Year	Title	Role	Notes
2000	Bette	Carol	Episode; Two Days at a Time
2004	The Tracy Morgan Show	Ms.Busby	Episode; Super Boy
2009	The Beast	Agent Sarah Brenner	Episode; Bitsy Big-Boy
2011	Detroit 1-8-7	Jeanelle Stilton	Episode; Road to Nowhere
2011	The Chicago Code	Sara Galivaris	2 episodes
2012–2013	The Mob Doctor	Transplant Coordinator	2 episodes
2013	Low Winter Sun	Regina Cook	2 episodes
2016	The Girlfriend Experience	Esthetician	Episode; Separation
2016	Empire	Nurse	Episode; Light in Darkness
2016	Easy	Shelby	Episode; The F**King Study
2017	Shrink	Julia	6 episodes
2018	Chicago Med	Luke's Mother	Episode; Born This Way
2019	Proven Innocent	Tamara Folsom	Episode; The Burden of Truth
2020	Utopia	Patty	Episode; Tuesday's Child
2021	The Big Leap	Debra Sadler	Episode; Revenge Plot
2022	Somebody Somewhere	Kim	Episode; Knick-Knacks and Doodads
2022	South Side	Ms. Langford	Episode; College
2023	Chicago P.D.	Marlene Bagley	Episode; Trapped
2018–2026	The Chi	Nina Williams	50 episodes
2024–present	NCIS: Origins	Mary Jo	Main Role

=== Theater ===
Year	Title	Theatre role	Notes	Ref
2003	Asylum (aka Life)	Writer and star of one-woman show	Penn Theater (Pittsburgh)	
2006	Intimate Apparel	Actress (Mayme)	Milwaukee Repertory Theater	
2007, 2009	The Piano Lesson	Actress (Berniece)	Portland Stage Company, Court Theatre	
2015	Good People	Actress (Kate)	Asolo Repertory Theatre	
2017	Paradise Blue	Actress (Silver)	TimeLine Theatre Company	
2017	East Texas Hot Links	Actress (Charlesetta)	Writers Theatre	
2021	The Last Pair of Earlies	Director	Raven Theatre (Chicago)	
2022	Relentless	Playwright	TimeLine Theatre Company (premiere), Goodman Theater	
