= Diany Rodriguez =

Puerto Rican actress

- Born: 1982 (age 43–44); Fajardo, Puerto Rico
- Occupation: Actress
- Years active: 2005–present

Diany Rodriguez (born 1982) is a Puerto Rican actress. She is best known for playing Special Agent Vera Strickland in the police drama series NCIS: Origins.

== Early life ==
Rodriguez was born in Fajardo, Puerto Rico and grew up in Jacksonville, Alabama. She was a self-described army brat. Both her parents and other family members served in the military. Her interest in acting stemmed from going to The Soldier Show, a variety show put on in the army base. Despite expecting to graduate to become a JAG Officer she became interested in the arts in high school joining a choir and a band playing clarinet. She ended up studying art with a concentration in political science and Spanish, minoring in theatre at the University of Alabama. Soon after she moved to New York City to pursue a career in public services.

== Career ==
One of Rodriguez' first big film roles was playing Natalie in the romantic comedy film The Valet. Her first big role came playing Weecha Xiu in the crime series The Blacklist. Her biggest role so far has been playing Vera Strickland in the police drama series NCIS: Origins. She has also done theatre work, with her best-known performance being the lead, Dolores Roach, in Empanada Loca, playwright Aaron Mark's twist on Sweeney Todd.

== Personal life ==
Her idols are Cate Blanchett, who she considers to be her generation's Meryl Streep; Zoe Saldaña, for being a successful fellow Latina; and the activist Jameela Jamil, for helping to get clean water to Sub-Saharan countries.

== Filmography ==
=== Film ===
Year	Title	Role	Notes
2005	Not Quite Right	Monique	
2010	Furry Chuck	Thumper	Short
2012	Firelight	Oketa	
2014	Pepper's Place	Donna	
2017	Pitch Perfect 3	Soldier Singer	
2019	Thank You For Calling	Woman	Short
2020	Star Trek First Frontier	Lieutenant Tai	
2021	The Suicide Squad	Star Crossed Gal	
2021	Night Teeth	Josephine	
2021	California Dreaming	Susanna	
2020	The In Between	Ms.Duffy	
2022	Thirty Candles	Ginny	Short
2022	The Valet	Natalie	

=== Television ===
Year	Title	Role	Notes
2011	The Vampire Diaries	Claudine	Episode: "The Birthday"
2015	Survivor's Remorse	Sports Star #9	Episode: "A Time to Punch"
2017	NCIS: New Orleans	DHS Agent Garcia	Episode: "Rogue Nation"
2017	Stan Against Evil	Gina	Episode: "Hex Marks the Tot"
2018	Lodge 49	Jeanette Aguilar	2 episodes
2018	Dynasty	Maria	Episode: "Snowflakes in Hell"
2019	Dead Silent	Officer Marina Lopez	Episode: "When A Stranger Knocks"
2019	Manifest	Detective Mendez	Episode: "Cleared for Approach"
2019	New Amsterdam	Gabriella Alvarez	Episode: "What the Heart Wants"
2019	Ray Donovan	Valentina Santiago	3 episodes
2019	The Purge	Lisa Ortiz	3 episodes
2020	For Life	Angry Woman	Episode: "Flounder Fam"
2020	The Outsider	Maria Caneles	2 episodes
2021	Tell Me Your Secrets	Mariana	Episode: "Burn Me When I'm Gone"
2021	Law & Order: Organized Crime	ADA Maria Delgado	2 episodes
2020	Bigger	Skye	2 episodes
2021	Hit & Run	Elena	Episode: "Friends & Foes"
2021	Bull	Ada O' Neill	Episode: "Espionage"
2022	Long Slow Exhale	Mason Holt	3 episodes
2022	The Resident	Abigail	Episode: "A River in Egypt"
2023	FBI: Most Wanted	Amy Storm	Episode: "The Miseducation of Metcalf 2"
2021–2023	The Blacklist	Weecha Xiu	25 episodes
2023	Twisted Metal	Amber Rose	3 episodes
2024	The Equalizer	Leshay	Episode: "Full Throttle"
2024	Teacup	Valeria Shanley	6 episodes
2025	Zero Day	Diana Moore	Episode: "#1.3"
2024–2025	NCIS: Origins	Vera Strickland	18 episodes
2026	All's Fair	Nurse Debra	Episode: "Thanksgiving: Part 2"
