= NCIS: Origins =

American television series (2024–present)

- Promotional image featuring Austin Stowell
- Genre: Action drama; Military; Police procedural
- Created by: Gina Lucita Monreal; David J. North
- Starring: Austin Stowell; Kyle Schmid; Mariel Molino; Tyla Abercrumbie; Diany Rodriguez; Caleb Foote; Mark Harmon
- Narrated by: Mark Harmon
- Composers: Deana Kiner; Kevin Kiner; Sean Kiner
- Original language: English
- No. of series: 3
- No. of episodes: 42 (list of episodes)

Production
- Executive producers: Mark Harmon; Sean Harmon; Gina Lucita Monreal; David J. North; Niels Arden Oplev; Eric Christian Olsen
- Producers: Michele Greco; Austin Stowell
- Editors: Brian Wessel; Kyle Keris; Mats Abbott; Imelda Betiong; Tirsa Hackshaw; Keith Henderson; Matthew Wingard
- Running time: 42–44 minutes
- Production companies: J. Bird (seasons 1–2); Ceci Bear Productions; Wings Productions; CBS Studios

Original release
- Network: CBS
- Release: October 14, 2024 – present

Related
- Hawaii Five-0; NCIS; NCIS: Los Angeles; NCIS: New Orleans; NCIS: Hawaiʻi; NCIS: Sydney; NCIS: Tony & Ziva; NCIS: New York

NCIS: Origins is an American police procedural television series, and the sixth installment in the NCIS franchise. It is a prequel to the original series and follows a younger Leroy Jethro Gibbs during his early career years as a Probationary NIS Agent while still processing the trauma of the murder of his wife and daughter.

The series premiered on October 14, 2024, on CBS.

In February 2025, the series was renewed for a second season, which premiered on October 14, 2025. In January 2026, it was renewed for a third season, which premiered on October 6, 2026.

== Synopsis ==
NCIS: Origins follows a young Leroy Jethro Gibbs in 1991, a decade prior to the events of NCIS. NCIS: Origins is narrated by the older Gibbs. In the series, Gibbs starts his career as a newly minted special agent at the fledgling NIS Camp Pendleton office, where he forges his place on a gritty, ragtag team led by NCIS legend Mike Franks.

== Cast ==
=== Main ===
- Austin Stowell as Special Agent Leroy Jethro Gibbs, a newcomer to the Pendleton branch of the Naval Investigative Service, the precursor to NCIS
  - Mark Harmon reprises his role as the older Leroy Jethro Gibbs, a now-retired veteran NCIS agent who provides voice-over context for each episode (voice-over season 1–present, guest season 1–2, main: season 3)
- Kyle Schmid as Special Agent Mike Franks, a seasoned agent and leader of the team
  - Muse Watson reprises his role as older Mike Franks, deceased retired Senior Special Agent for NCIS and Gibbs' former boss (guest season 3)
- Mariel Molino as Special Agent Cecilia "Lala" Dominguez, a former Marine determined to stand out in the male-dominated workplace
- Tyla Abercrumbie as Field Operation Support Officer Mary Jo Hayes, the self-described "Head Secretary in Charge"
- Diany Rodriguez as Special Agent Vera Strickland, a tough, no-nonsense agent
  - Roma Maffia reprises her role as older Vera Strickland, retired NCIS Special Agent (guest season 3)
- Caleb Foote as Special Agent Bernard "Randy" Randolf, the team's golden boy

=== Recurring ===
- Tonantzin Carmelo as Tish Kwa'la, Mike Franks' girlfriend
- Patrick Fischler as Special Agent in Charge Cliff Wheeler, head of NIS's Pendleton Office
- Julian Black Antelope as Chief Medical Examiner Témet Téngalkat, an unfazed, experienced ME with the San Diego County Medical Examiner's Office who works alongside NIS; he is a member of the Payómkawichum tribe and the uncle of Tish Kwa'la
- Michael Harney as Richard Kowalski, the NIS evidence custodian, who used to be Army chaplain and POW during the Korean War
- Daniel Bellomy as Herman "Herm" Daniels, an NIS agent acting as the evidence custodian's assistant
- Bobby Moynihan as Woodrow "Woody" Browne, a forensic analyst
- Ely Henry as Philip Elertson, a chemist who works with Woody
- Matthew Henerson as Carl Loughlin, an NIS agent
- Eric Normington as Roger Murphy, a former NIS agent who had a gambling problem
- Aaron Wilton as Special Agent JJ Henneberry, an NIS agent
- Marisa Baram as Gail Price, an NIS secretary
- Robert Taylor as Jackson Gibbs, Jethro's father (played by Ralph Waite in the original series)
- Jared Bankens as Jamison "Bugs" Boyd, a criminal profiled by Vera
- Lori Petty as Dr. Lenora Friedman, an assistant medical examiner
- Adam Huber as Luke Fletcher, counselor at the VA, real Sandman
- Jeffrey Boehm as Dalton “Basement”, an NIS agent
- Michael Shepperd as Smitty, the bartender at Daly's Tavern
- Eddie Alfano as Todd, a bouncer at Daly's Tavern
- Kathleen Kenny as Diane Sterling, a real estate agent and Gibb's second wife (played by Melinda McGraw in the original series)
- Christopher Backus as Abe Pruitt, leader of the Range
- Daphne Bloomer as Beth, member of the Range
- Julien Crane as Stanley Turner, member of the Range
- Kayla Maisonet as Nadia, a NIS secretary
- Miguel Gomez as Manny, a gang member who starts a relationship with Lala
- Philip Winchester as Mason Franks, Mike Franks' brother
- Gabriel Mann as Doug Westmont, a lawyer
- Hannah Barefoot as Senior FBI Agent Josephine “Joey” Swanson

=== Guest ===
- London Garcia as Ruth, Gibbs’ landlady
- DaJuan Johnson as FBI Agent Noah Oakley who works cases with the team and has a romantic past with Cliff Wheeler
- Lucas Dixon as FBI Special Agent Tobias C. Fornell
  - Joe Spano reprises his role as older Tobias C. Fornell, Private Detective and former FBI Senior Special Agent
- Claire Berger as Lara Macy. Lala's friend; military police investigator (played by Louise Lombard in the original series)
- Adam Campbell as Dr. Donald "Ducky" Mallard, a liaison from D.C. headquarters and an old acquaintance of Gibbs (played by David McCallum in the original series). Campbell reprises the role after portraying the young Ducky in four episodes of the original series.
- Kelly Albanese as Julie Larsen, Lala's sister
- Thomas Crawford as Dr. Walter Magnus, Medical Examiner with NIS Headquarters at the Navy Yard in D.C. and NIS Chief Medical Examiner before Dr. Donald "Ducky" Mallard (played by Bob Newhart in the original series)
- Shea Buckner as Dwayne Pride, a Sheriff's deputy turned NIS probie assigned to the NIS office in Panama who has a turbulent history with Gibbs (played by Scott Bakula in NCIS: New Orleans)
- Michael Weatherly as Anthony DiNozzo, present day NCIS Director
- Caroline Lagerfelt as Victoria Mallard, Ducky's mother (played by Nina Foch in the original series). Lagerfelt reprises the role after portraying the younger Victoria in the NCIS season 14 episode, "The Tie That Binds".
- Sean Harmon as FBI Special Agent Casey Bloom, one of Agent Swanson’s colleagues. Harmon is Mark Harmon’s real life son.
- Emily Wickersham as Eleanor Bishop, present day DOD Agent and former NCIS Special Agent

== Episodes ==
Season	Episodes	Originally released	
Season	Episodes	First released	Last released
1	18	October 14, 2024	April 28, 2025
2	18	October 14, 2025	May 5, 2026
3	10	October 6, 2026	January 19, 2027

== Production ==
NCIS: Origins was announced in January 2024, with franchise mainstays Gina Lucita Monreal and David J. North acting as showrunners. The series is executive produced by Mark Harmon and his son Sean Harmon, who had played a younger Gibbs in flashback sequences on the original show. The series was included on CBS's 2024–25 primetime schedule in May 2024. CBS said Mark Harmon would narrate and executive produce the series, with Sean Harmon, David J. North and Gina Lucita Monreal also executive producing. The show is filmed on a 1990s era recreated set of Camp Pendleton, built at Fort MacArthur, a former Army installation in San Pedro.

Austin Stowell was cast as Gibbs in March. Before Stowell was cast, Stephen Amell auditioned for the role. Mariel Molino, Kyle Schmid, Tyla Abercrombie and Diany Rodriguez completed the main cast in March. Lori Petty and Bobby Moynihan joined the cast in July.

On November 7, 2024, CBS ordered five additional episodes of the first season, bringing the season to 18 episodes. In January 2026, Gina Lucita Monreal announced that she would leave the series after the second season, with David J. North continuing as the sole showrunner for the third season.

On June 30, 2026 it was announced that NCIS: Los Angeles star Eric Christian Olsen would join the show as executive producer in season 3. It was also announced that Harmon would actively reprise his role as Leroy Jethro Gibbs for the season, appearing in all 10 episodes of the third season.

== Release ==
The series premiered on October 14, 2024, on CBS. The first season consists of 18 episodes. Its episodes stream on Paramount+. In Canada, the series airs on Global and is streaming on StackTV. In Southeast Asia, the series airs on AXN Asia.

For the 2026–27 television season, CBS scheduled the third season for Tuesdays at 10:00 p.m., after NCIS and NCIS: New York. The third season was reported to have a reduced episode order.

== Reception ==
=== Pre-release ===
Following the announcement of NCIS: Origins, fellow spinoff NCIS: Hawaiʻi was canceled after three seasons due to low ratings and budget cuts. This led to angered fans boycotting Origins.

=== Critical response ===
The review aggregator website Rotten Tomatoes reported an 88% approval rating for the first season. Metacritic, which uses a weighted average, assigned the series a score of 62 out of 100 based on eight critic reviews, indicating "generally favorable" reviews. Following the cancellation of NCIS: Hawaiʻi, some fans criticized CBS's decision to add another NCIS franchise series.
