= Christopher Silber =

American television writer and producer

Christopher "Chris" Silber (born October 6, 1973) is an American television writer and producer. He is also the showrunner of NCIS: New Orleans.

Silber was previously a producer and a writer for NCIS, Cold Case, CSI: NY, and Elementary. He also co-showran NCIS: Hawaiʻi which he co-created.

== Filmography ==
Year	Title	Credited as		Network
Year	Title	Writer	Producer	Network
2003	Tremors	Yes	No	Sci Fi Channel
2005–07; 2013–15	NCIS	Yes	Co-executive	CBS
2007–10	Cold Case	Yes	Co-producer	CBS
2010–12	CSI: NY	Yes	Co-executive	CBS
2012–13	Elementary	Yes	Co-executive	CBS
2015–21	NCIS: New Orleans	Yes	Executive	CBS
2021–24	NCIS: Hawaiʻi	Yes	Executive	CBS
