= NCIS season 13 =

Season of television series

NCIS
- Season 13
- Season 13 U.S. DVD cover
- Starring: Mark Harmon; Michael Weatherly; Pauley Perrette; Sean Murray; Brian Dietzen; Emily Wickersham; Rocky Carroll; David McCallum
- No. of episodes: 24

Release
- Original network: CBS
- Original release: September 22, 2015 – May 17, 2016

Season chronology
- ← Previous; Season 12 Next → Season 14

The thirteenth season of the American police procedural drama NCIS premiered on September 22, 2015, in the same time slot as in the previous seasons, Tuesdays at 8 pm.

NCIS depicts a fictional team of special agents from the Naval Criminal Investigative Service, which conducts criminal investigations involving the U.S. Navy and Marine Corps. The series was renewed for a thirteenth season by CBS on Monday, May 11, 2015. Michael Weatherly, who stars as Anthony DiNozzo on the show, departed the series in the season finale. On February 29, 2016, NCIS was renewed for seasons fourteen and fifteen.

== Cast ==
=== Main ===
- Mark Harmon as Leroy Jethro Gibbs, NCIS Supervisory Special Agent (SSA) of the Major Case Response Team (MCRT) assigned to Washington's Navy Yard
- Michael Weatherly as Anthony DiNozzo, NCIS Senior Special Agent, Second in Command of MCRT
- Pauley Perrette as Abby Sciuto, Forensic Specialist for NCIS
- Sean Murray as Timothy McGee, NCIS Special Agent
- Brian Dietzen as Jimmy Palmer, Assistant Medical Examiner for NCIS
- Emily Wickersham as Eleanor "Ellie" Bishop, NCIS Special Agent
- Rocky Carroll as Leon Vance, NCIS Director
- David McCallum as Dr. Donald "Ducky" Mallard, Chief Medical Examiner for NCIS

=== Recurring ===
- Alan Dale as Thomas Morrow, Homeland Security Section Chief and former NCIS Director
- Joe Spano as Tobias Fornell, FBI Senior Special Agent
- Richard Riehle as Maynard County Sheriff Walt Osorio and Sherlock Consortium member
- Kent Shocknek as Guy Ross, ZNN news anchor
- Adam Campbell as young Donald Mallard
- Salli Richardson-Whitfield as Carrie Clark, former FBI Special Agent, turned criminal attorney
- Jessica Walter as Judith McKnight, Sherlock Consortium member
- Todd Louiso as Lyle Waznicki, Sherlock Consortium member
- Joel Gretsch as Stan Burley, NCIS Special Agent and former member of Gibbs' team
- Scottie Thompson as Jeanne Woods, Tony's ex-girlfriend
- David Dayan Fisher as Trent Kort, rogue CIA Agent
- Robert Wagner as Anthony DiNozzo, Sr., Tony's father
- Leslie Hope as Sarah Porter, Secretary of the Navy
- Margo Harshman as Delilah Fielding, DoD Computer Specialist and McGee's girlfriend
- Juliette Angelo as Emily Fornell, Tobias Fornell's daughter
- Kelli Williams as Maureen Cabot, NCIS Special Agent
- Jamie Bamber as Jake Malloy, NSA attorney and Bishop's ex-husband
- Mimi Rogers as Joanna Teague, CIA Agent and Ned Dorneget's mother
- Sarah Clarke as Tess Monroe, FBI Senior Special Agent
- Duane Henry as Clayton Reeves, MI6 Senior Officer
- Mila Brener as Kelly Gibbs, Gibbs' deceased daughter
- Jon Cryer as Dr. Cyril Taft, surgeon who operates on Gibbs
- Laura San Giacomo as Dr. Grace Confalone, psychotherapist
- Marina Sirtis as Orli Elbaz, Mossad Director

=== Guests ===
- David Andrews as U.S. Secretary of Defense Errol Coyne
- Giles Matthey as Daniel Budd, NCIS target, head of "The Calling" terrorist group
- Adetokumboh M'Cormack as Matthew Rousseau, "The Calling" member
- Daniel Zolghadri as Luke Harris, "The Calling" recruit who shot Gibbs
- Muse Watson as Mike Franks, deceased retired Senior Special Agent for NCIS and Gibbs' former boss
- Scott Bakula as Dwayne Pride, NCIS Supervisory Special Agent (SSA) in New Orleans
- Lucas Black as Christopher LaSalle, NCIS Senior Field Agent in New Orleans
- Zoe McLellan as Meredith "Merri" Brody, NCIS Special Agent in New Orleans
- Shalita Grant as Sonja Percy, NCIS Special Agent in New Orleans
- Tyler Ritter as Luca Sciuto, Abby's brother
- Cassidy Freeman as Eva Azarova, Russian sleeper agent
- Andy Beckwith as HM Prison Service Custodial Manager Chester Grimm
- Vince Nappo as Jacob Scott, former prisoner being pursued by Tony along with MI6
- Michelle Obama as herself
- Stephanie Koenig as Lauren Hudson, mistress of Marine Captain Dean Hudson

== Episodes ==
No. overall	No. in season	Title	Directed by	Written by	Original release date	Prod. code	U.S. viewers (millions)
283	1	"Stop the Bleeding"	Tony Wharmby	Gary Glasberg & Scott Williams	September 22, 2015	1301	18.19
Part 4 of 4: In the aftermath of Gibbs being shot (in "Neverland"), he is brought to the U.S.S. Daniel Webster, where he is treated by Navy Doctor Cyril Taft. As the team waits for news on Gibbs' condition, DiNozzo and CIA officer Joanna Teague travel to China to dismantle The Calling. Gibbs survives his surgery and eventually returns to the NCIS office, while forming a friendship with Dr. Taft. The Calling dupes the United States into believing that North Korea intends to instigate World War III by launching a nuclear warhead from one of their Sinpo-class submarines. McGee finds and disables the still-active code on Special Agent Ned Dorneget's laptop which is sending false signals. Tony personally tracks down and kills Daniel Budd, leader of The Calling.
284	2	"Personal Day"	Terrence O'Hara	Gina Lucita Monreal	September 29, 2015	1302	16.53
Gibbs assigns the team to assist DEA agent Luis Mitchell tackle a cold case involving a drug dealer. During the case, DiNozzo discovers Mitchell and Gibbs share a tragic past.
285	3	"Incognito"	James Whitmore Jr.	George Schenck & Frank Cardea	October 6, 2015	1303	16.87
When a Marine who had information concerning a case is found dead, the NCIS team investigates, prompting McGee and Bishop to go undercover as a military couple.
286	4	"Double Trouble"	Dennis Smith	Christopher J. Waild	October 13, 2015	1304	16.04
When a murder case is connected to a former NCIS agent who Director Vance locked up for stealing evidence years ago, he partners with Gibbs and returns to field duty only to realize why he decided to give it up.
287	5	"Lockdown"	Bethany Rooney	Stephen D. Binder	October 20, 2015	1305	17.21
Abby is trapped with little to no communication to the outside world while visiting a pharmaceutical lab during a murder investigation after armed men take over the building and hold everyone hostage.
288	6	"Viral"	Rocky Carroll	Jennifer Corbett	October 27, 2015	1306	16.81
The NCIS team must determine if a murder of a petty officer is the murderer's latest victim or the work of a copycat when the murder matches the M.O. of a local serial killer. Meanwhile, McGee and Delilah must learn to compromise before moving in together.
289	7	"16 Years"	Mark Horowitz	Brendan Fehily	November 3, 2015	1307	17.97
The NCIS team investigates a murder case of a retired Navy Lieutenant Commander which opens up a convicted murderer's case. Ducky is forced to reveal his participation in a secret society that solves cold cases and related to the murder.
290	8	"Saviors"	Tony Wharmby	Scott Williams	November 10, 2015	1308	16.68
When insurgents in South Sudan attack a group of volunteer doctors, Special Agent Stan Burley asks the team for help. DiNozzo and McGee travel to the crime scene for the joint murder and kidnapping case then join the search for the missing doctors. Things get personal for DiNozzo as he is reunited with his ex-girlfriend Jeanne Benoit. When Gibbs faints, Dr. Cyril Taft does tests on him to see what is wrong. Gibbs wonders if he should talk about what happened to him.
291	9	"Day In Court"	Dennis Smith	George Schenck & Frank Cardea	November 17, 2015	1309	16.59
Criminal attorney Carrie Clark, a former FBI Special Agent, approaches Gibbs with Navy PO3 Kyle Friedgen who was accused of murdering his ex-girlfriend, Joy Vanatter, after his case is dismissed when a mishandled warrant excludes key evidence. But Friedgen still wants his "day in court" via court-martial to prove to his wife Hanna and to his shipmates and Commander, Bradley Hall, that he is innocent. DiNozzo works with his former Baltimore PD colleague Det. Ramsey Malone, and an old C.I., Francis "Cheech" Del Conte, to review the evidence. Assistant State's Attorney Alan Wyner is confident Friedgen will be found guilty, solidifying his bid to be promoted to State's Attorney. Meanwhile, Bishop and her husband, NSA Attorney Jake Malloy, hit a rough patch after she discovers he is having an affair with NSA IA officer, Taylor Matthews.
292	10	"Blood Brothers"	Arvin Brown	Teleplay by : Jennifer Corbett; Story by : Gary Glasberg & Jennifer Corbett	November 24, 2015	1310	16.19
When the two siblings of a leukemia-stricken sailor are killed in action, the NCIS team works with Fornell to find the sailor's only remaining sibling, who is currently undercover in a counterfeiting ring and a potential donor. Meanwhile, Bishop goes back to Oklahoma for Thanksgiving after learning of Jake's infidelity.
293	11	"Spinning Wheel"	Terrence O'Hara	Steven D. Binder	December 15, 2015	1311	15.53
Ducky receives a disturbing call and rushes out to meet a man claiming to be a lawyer with information on Ducky's supposedly dead half-brother Nicholas Mallard, by his step-mother Lorraine. The team, investigating the stabbing death of Marine Private John Angel, find Ducky tied up inside a nearby van. In flash-backs to 1973, young Donald Mallard's story is revealed, reporting at the hospital to Nurse Cooper concerning Field Marshal Rand. Ducky's father Joseph tells him Lorraine filed for divorce and is taking young Nicholas out of the country. The van's owner, Sam Butler, rented it out to Rufus Simms, who was with Ducky's attacker. Rufus is found dead in Butler's home with a letter to Ducky, supposedly from Nicholas. Ducky recalls consulting Barrister Angus Clarke to fight for custody of Nicholas, to no avail. Abby finds a lead from Rufus to Dwayne Parker's pawn shop, where they learn of a stamp worth $500,000, and identify Ducky's attacker as Philadelphia P.I. Viggo Trellis. They track Trellis from his cell phone and find a different Nicholas Mallard. But with new leads, the team finds Ducky's brother Nicholas in a rest home. Meanwhile, Ellie ends things with Jake for good.
294	12	"Sister City (Part I)"	Leslie Libman	Christopher J. Waild	January 5, 2016	1312	18.97
At Naval Air Station Patuxent River, PO1 Heidi Orr informs Capt. Kensington Bloom that the FAA reported a rogue Washington-bound civilian jet from New Orleans. PO1 Felix Kane reports two F18 Hornets intercepting for visual inspection; the plane is on autopilot, the pilots and three others dead. Tony grudgingly confirms he and Zoe broke up. With D.C. endangered, the Navy receives orders to shoot down the plane over a sparsely populated area. A Blye Industries plane, it's owned by high-end military technology developer Jenner Blye. Abby sends false GPS instructions, bringing it down. New Orleans NCIS SSA Dwayne Pride informs Gibbs that Abby's brother Luca Sciuto was the on-board chef for the flight. They discover Luca was not onboard, but suspect he may have poisoned them. The team questions Blye CFO Dalton Greenbrick and security head Blake Huxley, and learn Blye was not actually onboard. Interrogated, they learn Luca is involved with Russian sleeper spy Eva Azarova. They track Eva's phone call to Russian Counselor Anton Pavlenko, who is also poisoned. Before the consulate can act, Ducky and Palmer abscond with Pavlenko's body to investigate further, but are intercepted by armed men.... Note: This episode begins a crossover event that concludes on NCIS: New Orleans season 2 episode 12.
295	13	"Déjà Vu"	Rocky Carroll	Matthew R. Jarrett & Scott J. Jarrett	January 19, 2016	1313	17.51
After a female Navy seaman is found in a garbage truck, the team discovers a tracking device inside of her that leads to one of Bishop's old NSA cases involving a human trafficking ring. Meanwhile, as a snowstorm rages, McGee seeks a place to stay with heat.
296	14	"Decompressed"	Thomas J. Wright	Brendan Fehily	February 9, 2016	1314	16.94
After a Navy diver dies in a decompression tank, NCIS must wait four days for the tank to fully decompress. While waiting, the team is forced to rely on his three colleagues inside of the tank to get the information they need about the diver – and all three soon become suspects when the diver's death turns out to be a murder.
297	15	"React"	Bethany Rooney	Jennifer Corbett	February 16, 2016	1315	17.34
NCIS and the FBI search for SECNAV's daughter after she is kidnapped. NCIS Special Agent Valerie Page, McGee's childhood friend, comes to assist with advance tactics training.
298	16	"Loose Cannons"	Alrick Riley	Scott Williams	February 23, 2016	1316	17.47
After crates of assault rifles are stolen from a Navy base, the team's investigation soon brings in Dr. Taft and Jeanne Benoit-Woods. Tony deals with Jeanne as the case brings up old wounds. Meanwhile, Taft tries to get Gibbs to see a therapist.
299	17	"After Hours"	Terrence O'Hara	Cindi Hemingway	March 1, 2016	1317	15.44
The NCIS agents' personal plans are interrupted when each of them catches errors in a seemingly open-and-shut case. At home, McGee and Delilah argue over the importance of not discussing work during dinner, while DiNozzo bores his date with shop talk.
300	18	"Scope"	Tony Wharmby	Gary Glasberg & Gina Lucita Monreal	March 15, 2016	1318	15.10
After an American couple is killed in Iraq, the team discovers that the weapon used was taken from a Marine ambush. Gibbs goes to reconnect with the lone survivor of the attack, a fellow Marine sniper.
301	19	"Reasonable Doubts"	Thomas J. Wright	George Schenck & Frank Cardea	March 22, 2016	1319	15.90
When a Navy journalist is found dead, the team attempts to figure out who is telling the truth with their stories – his wife and his mistress. Meanwhile, a homeless woman claims that DiNozzo Senior is her father.
302	20	"Charade"	Edward Ornelas	Brendan Fehily	April 5, 2016	1320	15.67
When a Senator claims DiNozzo has been blackmailing him, the team discovers that this is happening to two other Senators.
303	21	"Return to Sender"	Leslie Libman	Christopher J. Waild	April 19, 2016	1321	14.80
Part 1 of 4: When a British prison guard is found dead in a shipping container, the team works with Fornell to track down the two prisoners who used the container to escape, one of whom was a former MI6 spy put away by Tom Morrow. Meanwhile, McGee and Bishop try to figure out how Tony affords his lavish apartment. Gibbs and Fornell later arrive at Morrow's home and find Morrow dead in his study from a gunshot to the head, ending the episode in a cliffhanger.
304	22	"Homefront"	Dennis Smith	Gina Lucita Monreal & Jennifer Corbett	May 3, 2016	1322	14.86
Part 2 of 4: Following Tom Morrow's death, Director Vance follows a lead left by DiNozzo, who is currently in Russia with his own lead on Jacob Scott. Vance and Agent Fornell travel to London to find Jessica Terdei, a retired MI6 agent involved in Operation Juniper Strike. Meanwhile, Gibbs and the rest of his team investigate a home invasion of a Marine which was stopped by his teenage son, but later suspects that the son is hiding something else. The episode ends with Fornell being badly wounded after an ambush at Gibbs' house. Cast: First Lady Michelle Obama makes an appearance in support of Joining Forces. Michael Weatherly does not appear in this episode.
305	23	"Dead Letter"	James Whitmore Jr.	Steven D. Binder	May 10, 2016	1323	16.04
Part 3 of 4: Fornell is in critical condition after being ambushed in Gibbs' house. NCIS places all people on Jacob Scott's hit list into protective custody except for two missing people, both of them former NCIS agents. Gibbs and his team manage to find them with help from FBI agent Tess Monroe, MI6 agent Clayton Reeves and a returning Trent Kort. Scott later turns himself in, claiming he is being framed for everything, and that the only person that can clear his name is another former NCIS agent, Ziva David. It turns out that Scott was telling the truth and Kort is the true culprit. The episode ends in a cliffhanger, revealing that the farmhouse belonging to the late former Mossad director, Eli David, was bombed and was this was the supposed location of Ziva.
306	24	"Family First"	Tony Wharmby	Gary Glasberg & Scott Williams	May 17, 2016	1324	18.01
Part 4 of 4: Tony prepares to go to Israel after learning of a possible survivor at Eli David's farmhouse which was attacked while the rest of the team continues to hunt the fugitive Trent Kort. Tony's father tries to reassure him, but Abby and McGee solemnly visit Tony at his apartment. As he is getting ready to leave, he realizes that Ziva has apparently died in the attack. A devastated Tony is left to pick up the pieces of his life, and Mossad director Orli Elbaz visits NCIS to inform Tony of his and Ziva's daughter, whom he never knew existed and was named Tali in honor of Ziva's late sister. At first, Tony is offended that Ziva never told him about Tali and struggles to find his footing as a father, but he is helped by the rest of the team and his own father along the way. After the team locates Kort and finally kills him, Tony visits Gibbs and announces he will resign so he can take care of Tali as a single dad, intending on taking her to Israel to "look for some answers" and then to Paris, as "Ziva loves Paris," showing his belief that Ziva may still be alive as her body had never been found. He then says farewell to the rest of the team. Cast: Last regular appearance of Michael Weatherly as Anthony DiNozzo until season 24.

== Production ==
The series was renewed for a thirteenth season by CBS on Monday, May 11, 2015. Production on this season started in late July. On January 5, 2016, CBS announced Weatherly's departure from the series after thirteen seasons. Scottie Thompson returned as Jeanne Benoit, Tony's ex-girlfriend, in episodes 8 and 16. Scott Bakula, Lucas Black, Zoe McLellan, and Shalita Grant star in a crossover with NCIS: New Orleans, in the episode "Sister City (Part I)", as NCIS Special Agent Dwayne Pride, NCIS Special Agent Christopher LaSalle, NCIS Special Agent Meredith "Merri" Brody, and NCIS Special Agent Sonja Percy, respectively.

== Ratings ==
Viewership and ratings per episode of NCIS season 13
No.	Title	Air date	Rating/share (18–49)	Viewers (millions)	DVR (18–49)	DVR viewers (millions)	Total (18–49)	Total viewers (millions)
1	"Stop the Bleeding"	September 22, 2015	2.5/8	18.19	1.1	4.27	3.6	22.47
2	"Personal Day"	September 29, 2015	2.2/8	16.53	0.9	3.93	3.1	20.46
3	"Incognito"	October 6, 2015	2.2/7	16.87	1.0	3.87	3.2	20.74
4	"Double Trouble"	October 13, 2015	2.1/7	16.04	0.8	3.63	2.9	19.67
5	"Lockdown"	October 20, 2015	2.2/7	17.21	0.9	3.75	3.1	20.97
6	"Viral"	October 27, 2015	2.1/7	16.81	0.9	3.92	3.0	20.74
7	"16 Years"	November 3, 2015	2.3/8	17.97	0.8	3.66	3.1	21.64
8	"Saviors"	November 10, 2015	2.3/7	16.68	0.9	4.03	3.2	20.71
9	"Day in Court"	November 17, 2015	2.2/7	16.59	0.9	3.78	3.1	20.37
10	"Blood Brothers"	November 24, 2015	2.2/7	16.19	0.9	4.27	3.1	20.46
11	"Spinning Wheel"	December 15, 2015	2.1/7	15.53	1.0	4.46	3.1	19.99
12	"Sister City (Part I)"	January 5, 2016	2.7/9	18.97	1.1	4.20	3.8	23.17
13	"Déjà Vu"	January 19, 2016	2.4/8	17.51	1.0	3.87	3.4	21.38
14	"Decompressed"	February 9, 2016	2.4/8	16.94	0.9	3.63	3.3	20.57
15	"React"	February 16, 2016	2.3/8	17.34	0.9	3.62	3.2	20.96
16	"Loose Cannons"	February 23, 2016	2.4/8	17.47	0.9	3.62	3.3	21.09
17	"After Hours"	March 1, 2016	2.0/7	15.44	0.9	3.83	2.9	19.24
18	"Scope"	March 15, 2016	2.0/7	15.10	0.9	3.99	2.9	19.07
19	"Reasonable Doubts"	March 22, 2016	2.0/7	15.90	0.9	3.75	2.9	19.65
20	"Charade"	April 5, 2016	2.0/7	15.67	0.9	3.76	2.9	19.43
21	"Return to Sender"	April 19, 2016	1.9/7	14.80	0.9	4.12	2.8	18.92
22	"Homefront"	May 3, 2016	1.9/7	14.86	0.9	3.89	2.8	18.75
23	"Dead Letter"	May 10, 2016	2.1/8	16.04	1.0	4.30	3.1	20.34
24	"Family First"	May 17, 2016	2.6/9	18.01	0.9	4.10	3.5	22.12
