= NCIS season 12 =

Season of television series

NCIS
- Season 12
- Season 12 U.S. DVD cover
- Starring: Mark Harmon; Michael Weatherly; Pauley Perrette; Sean Murray; Brian Dietzen; Emily Wickersham; Rocky Carroll; David McCallum
- No. of episodes: 24

Release
- Original network: CBS
- Original release: September 23, 2014 – May 12, 2015

Season chronology
- ← Previous; Season 11 Next → Season 13

The twelfth season of the police procedural drama NCIS premiered on September 23, 2014, in the same time slot as in the previous seasons, Tuesdays at 8 pm. This is the first season in which NCIS: Los Angeles did not air after NCIS. This season, NCIS: New Orleans aired after NCIS. The entire season eleven cast renewed their contracts and returned for the new season. The premiere episode aired on September 23, 2014 and was seen by 18.23 million people.

The main antagonist of the season is Sergei Mishnev, played by Alex Veadov. This character first appears in the premiere episode "Twenty Klicks". In episode four, "Choke Hold", one of Sergei's associates is sent to the United States to kill a Russian scientist who refused to work with him. Anton Pavlenko (previously seen in "Twenty Klicks"), portrayed by Lev Gorn, a Russian counselor, reappears in this episode. Veadov returns as Sergei in "Check" where he "gets personal" with Gibbs by killing Gibbs' ex-wife Diane in the same way that Caitlin Todd was killed, stalking Rebecca, another of Gibbs' ex-wives, and staging murders mimicking the deaths of Mike Franks and Jenny Shepard. Sergei returns again in "Cabin Fever", where he is killed by Tobias Fornell, who was also married to Diane at one point and who was dealing with intense grief and depression following Diane's murder. It is revealed that Sergei and Ari Haswari are half brothers from Ari's mother, whereas Ari and Ziva David were half brother and sister from their father, Eli David.

== Cast and characters ==
=== Main ===
- Mark Harmon as Leroy Jethro Gibbs, NCIS Supervisory Special Agent (SSA) of the Major Case Response Team (MCRT) assigned to Washington's Navy Yard
- Michael Weatherly as Anthony DiNozzo, NCIS Senior Special Agent, Second in Command of MCRT
- Pauley Perrette as Abby Sciuto, Forensic Specialist for NCIS
- Sean Murray as Timothy McGee, NCIS Special Agent
- Brian Dietzen as Jimmy Palmer, Assistant Medical Examiner for NCIS
- Emily Wickersham as Eleanor "Ellie" Bishop, NCIS Probationary Special Agent
- Rocky Carroll as Leon Vance, NCIS Director
- David McCallum as Dr. Donald "Ducky" Mallard, Chief Medical Examiner for NCIS

=== Recurring ===
- Alan Dale as Thomas Morrow, Homeland Security Section Chief and former NCIS Director
- Joe Spano as Tobias Fornell, FBI Senior Special Agent
- Adam Campbell as young Donald Mallard
- Salli Richardson-Whitfield as Carrie Clark, former FBI Special Agent, turned criminal attorney
- Susanna Thompson as Hollis Mann, DoD Special Agent, Gibbs' former girlfriend and former Army CID Special Agent
- Robert Wagner as Anthony Di Nozzo, Sr., Tony's father
- Michelle Pierce as Breena Palmer, Jimmy Palmer's wife
- Tamer Hassan as Agah Bayar, NCIS target
- Diane Neal as Abigail Borin, CGIS Special Agent in Charge
- Kiara Muhammad as Kayla Vance, Leon Vance's daughter
- Melinda McGraw as Diane Sterling, IRS Special Agent and Gibbs' and Fornell's ex-wife
- Matt L. Jones as Ned Dorneget, NCIS Special Agent, Cyber Division
- Leslie Hope as Sarah Porter, Secretary of the Navy
- Margo Harshman as Delilah Fielding, DoD Computer Specialist and McGee's girlfriend
- Juliette Angelo as Emily Fornell, Tobias Fornell's daughter
- Jamie Bamber as Jake Malloy, NSA Attorney and Bishop's husband
- Kent Shocknek as Guy Ross, ZNN news anchor
- Tony Gonzalez as Tony Francis, NCIS Special Agent
- Marisol Nichols as Zoe Keates, ATF Special Agent and DiNozzo's girlfriend
- Rafi Silver as Qasim Naasir, a translator who worked with NCIS
- Mimi Rogers as Joanna Teague, CIA Agent and Ned Dorneget's mother
- Lev Gorn as Russian Counselor Anton Pavlenko
- Alex Veadov as Sergei Mishnev, NCIS target

=== Guests ===
- Alice Krige as Maggie Clarke
- Hannah Marshall as Young Maggie
- Adam Croasdell as Young Angus Clarke
- Stephanie Jacobsen as FBI Agent Leia Pendergast
- Michael Ensign as Dr. Ishmael Havana
- Millie Brown as Rachel Barnes
- Josh Randall as Navy SEAL Commander Ryan Barnes
- Kenneth Mitchell as Nathan Curtis
- Bronson Pinchot as George Burton
- Sasha Alexander as Caitlin Todd, deceased NCIS Special Agent who was killed by Ari Haswari
- Jessica Steen as Paula Cassidy, deceased NCIS Senior Special Agent
- Tim Kelleher as Chris Pacci, deceased NCIS Special Agent
- Lauren Holly as Jenny Shepard, deceased NCIS Director
- Muse Watson as Mike Franks, deceased retired Senior Special Agent for NCIS and Gibbs' former boss
- Jeri Ryan as Rebecca Chase, Gibbs third wife and ex-wife #2
- Andy Milder as Gene Isaacson
- Reggie Hayes as Café Owner
- Lucy Walsh as Alice, Café Waitress
- Ellen Hollman as NCIS Special Agent Tina Larsen
- Lisa Banes as Ambassador Olivia Edmunds
- A Martinez as Tomas Orlando
- Arturo Del Puerto as Edward "Collarbone" Rosario
- Alanna Ubach as NSA Senior Intelligence Analyst Sofia Martinez
- John D'Aquino as Ken Ashmore
- Ted King as Colonel Daniel Collins
- Kate Beahan as DGSI Divisional Commissioner Colette Girard

== Episodes ==
| No. overall | No. in season | Title | Directed by | Written by | Original release date | Prod. code | U.S. viewers (millions) |
|---|---|---|---|---|---|---|---|
| 259 | 1 | "Twenty Klicks" | Tony Wharmby | Gary Glasberg & Scott Williams | September 23, 2014 | 1201 | 18.23 |
Gibbs and McGee escort NCIS Systems Administrator Kevin Hussein back to the U.S. from Russia. Things go awry when their transport helicopter is shot down by Russian terrorist Sergei Mishnev against orders from Russian Counselor Anton Pavlenko who warned Mishnev to abandon revenge against NCIS, and Gibbs in particular. But Mishnev is after classified information that Hussein was supposed to smuggle. Abby identifies the missile as coming from a stolen Russian 9K32 Strela-2 launcher. They crash into the wilderness of the Kola Peninsula near the Finnish border. At the NCIS field office in Washington, D.C., the team find themselves navigating a diplomatic minefield. When the Russian embassy hampers search and rescue efforts, they mount their own rescue. Fleeing on-foot from the crash site twenty klicks through the forest, chased by armed mercenaries, Gibbs uses his sniper training to take them out one-by-one until Mishnev himself falls...or does he?
| 260 | 2 | "Kill the Messenger" | Dennis Smith | George Schenck & Frank Cardea | September 30, 2014 | 1202 | 18.84 |
A lieutenant commander in the U.S. Navy is murdered before his private meeting with the President of the United States. The team investigates to see if he was another unfortunate victim of a criminal streak or intentionally targeted for valuable information. Director Vance receives some devastating news.
| 261 | 3 | "So It Goes" | Leslie Libman | Steven D. Binder | October 7, 2014 | 1203 | 17.30 |
Ducky returns to London after a case reveals a connection to his estranged childhood best friend. He is accompanied by Agent Bishop, who helps him interview his friend's family and coworkers. Meanwhile, Ducky recalls the choices he made in the past and the impact they've had on his adult life.
| 262 | 4 | "Choke Hold" | Terrence O'Hara | Christopher J. Waild | October 14, 2014 | 1204 | 17.26 |
After events in "Twenty Klicks," Sofia Glazman from the Navy Research Lab is murdered using a motorized garrote which first chokes, then decapitates her. Dr. Ishmael Havana tells the team she had been working on hi-tech data transfer lasers. At the behest of Russian Counselor Anton Pavlenko, SECNAV Porter places the NCIS team in a Joint Terrorism Task Force led by FBI Special Agent Leia Pendergast to find Russian scientist Nelly Benin, who Pavlenko believes is being employed by the terrorist Sergei Mishnev. Pavlenko suspects that Nelly killed both her colleague and Sofia, her former lab partner. Once found, Nelly attempts to defect to the U.S., but she is turned over to Leia for deportation. Too late, Bishop identifies the real killer; Russian expatriate hit-woman Renata Atal. DiNozzo and McGee try to apprehend her, but she uses her own garrote to kill herself. With no way to prove or disprove Pavlenko ordered the murders, Porter has no choice but to return Nelly to Russia. But Nelly refuses to go, drawing a weapon, forcing Leia to shoot her. Pavlenko, believing Nelly dead and his problem solved, leaves. Gibbs reveals the ruse to Porter; Leia fired blanks, and Nelly lives to defect.
| 263 | 5 | "The San Dominick" | Arvin Brown | Christopher Silber | October 21, 2014 | 1205 | 17.13 |
Special Agent Gibbs and CGIS Agent Borin discover the body of a man who is a missing crew member from a ship that is sixty nautical miles away. Once aboard the ship, Gibbs realizes that it has been commandeered by pirates, but all is not what it seems.
| 264 | 6 | "Parental Guidance Suggested" | Thomas J. Wright | Jennifer Corbett | October 28, 2014 | 1206 | 17.53 |
Dr. Valerie Barnes, wife of Navy SEAL Commander Ryan Barnes, is shot to death. Her daughter Rachel discovers the body after her neighbor Nathan Curtis drops her off from school. Gibbs takes Rachel under his wing to comfort her. Ryan's name is found at an online jihadist hit list after his involvement in the capture of terrorist Benham Parsa (in "Monsters and Men"). NCIS must determine if Valerie's death was terrorist retaliation, or something much more sinister. McGee poses as a mercenary detonator expert to capture the jihadi webmaster, but McGee is tackled by Tony's old partner from the Philadelpa Police Department, Zoë Keates, who is now an ATF Special Agent; her team had already raided the site, and left it open for business as a sting operation. Now discounting jihad as motive, suspicion falls next on Dr. Barnes' patients, including sociopathic serial killer George Burton, currently incarcerated. After her patients are ruled out, Abby reconstructs the fragmented .38 slug which matches Nathan's gun; but he has a compelling explanation. Unlikely suspicion falls next on the husband, Ryan, who admits killing his wife, but for Gibbs, something doesn't add up.
| 265 | 7 | "The Searchers" | Tony Wharmby | Gina Lucita Monreal | November 11, 2014 | 1207 | 17.49 |
After the murder of a retired master sergeant, NCIS uncovers a fraudulent charity that preys on those searching for missing military personnel. Meanwhile, Bishop agonizes over her probationary exam results.
| 266 | 8 | "Semper Fortis" | Dennis Smith | Matthew R. Jarrett & Scott J. Jarrett | November 18, 2014 | 1208 | 18.10 |
Gibbs looks for a way to clear a former Navy hospital corpsman 3rd Class Anna Dillon of charges after she had illegally helped the victims of a hit and run. Abby's relationship with Burt hits the two-month mark.
| 267 | 9 | "Grounded" | Bethany Rooney | Scott Williams | November 25, 2014 | 1209 | 16.01 |
While weather worsens outdoors, DiNozzo, Bishop and her husband Jake are stuck at Dulles Airport. While there, they end up working on a case involving a terrorist threat.
| 268 | 10 | "House Rules" | Terrence O'Hara | Christopher J. Waild | December 16, 2014 | 1210 | 17.53 |
During Christmas, the hacker "Krampus" crashes the Washington, D.C. internet via DDoS. To help, NCIS enlists three convicted hackers they arrested: Ajay Khan ("Canary"), Kevin Hussein ("Twenty Klicks"), and Heidi Partridge ("Page Not Found"). McGee reflects on Gibbs' rules in a letter to his estranged father, which he places in his casket.: Rules quoted: #39 There is no such thing as coincidence. #3 Never be unreachable. #1 (both #1's) Never put your suspects together, and, Never screw over your partner. #10 Never get personally involved in a case. #36 If you feel like you are being played, you probably are. #40 If it seems like someone is out to get you, they are. #5 Don't waste good. #15 Always work as a team. #3 (the other #3) Don't believe what you're told. Double check. #8 Never take anything for granted. #12 Never date a co-worker. #9 Never go anywhere without a knife. #22 Never ever bother Gibbs in interrogation. #13 Never, ever involve lawyers. #42 Never accept an apology from someone who just sucker punched you. #51 Sometimes you're wrong.; Retrospective footage features Cote de Pablo, Sasha Alexander, Liza Lapira, Muse Watson, Troian Bellisario and Lauren Holly.
| 269 | 11 | "Check" | Alrick Riley | Steven D. Binder | January 6, 2015 | 1211 | 19.76 |
NCIS responds to a shootout at a café where five people are dead. Surprisingly, two of Gibbs' ex-wives, Diane Sterling and Rebecca Chase, show up to discuss something important with him. After the team learns the victims were killed elsewhere and the café scene was staged, another killing occurs. Both exactly mimic previous crime scenes; Jenny Shepard's diner shoot out (in "Judgment Day (Part I)"), and Mike Franks' street stabbing (in "Swan Song"). When they learn that Rebecca received $300,000 from the Caymans, Gibbs must interrogate her, but she claims she's been set up. Abby finds a bug in Rebecca's cell phone that ties the crimes to Russian terrorist Sergei Mishnev. Gibbs and Diane are then lured to a parking structure where Mishnev kills Diane the same way Ari Haswari killed Kate Todd (in Twilight); from a sniper's nest. Abby uses I.T. Kevin's virus he built for Mishnev (in "Twenty Klicks") to back-trace and locate Mishnev. Gibbs busts into Mishnev's apartment claiming "Checkmate" but Gibbs is knocked unconscious; Mishnev escapes. Note: Lauren Holly and Muse Watson appear in archive footage.
| 270 | 12 | "The Enemy Within" | James Whitmore Jr. | George Schenck & Frank Cardea | January 13, 2015 | 1212 | 19.87 |
NCIS hunts down a homegrown terrorist after a rescue mission in Syria reveals that an American was involved in the kidnapping of a social worker. McGee and Bishop question Tony's recent habits as ATF Special Agent Zoe Keates returns to work the case and turns out to be his girlfriend. Meanwhile, Tobias Fornell is struggling with the loss of Diane and raising Emily alone.
| 271 | 13 | "We Build, We Fight" | Rocky Carroll | Jennifer Corbett | February 3, 2015 | 1213 | 18.64 |
The team's investigation into an officer's death leads to the discovery that he was gay, and the investigation gets Hollis Mann involved when the victim was being considered for the Medal of Honor. Meanwhile, Breena goes into labor and gives birth to a daughter: Victoria Elizabeth Palmer.
| 272 | 14 | "Cadence" | Tony Wharmby | Christopher Silber | February 10, 2015 | 1214 | 18.77 |
When a Marine private is found dead, the investigation leads Tony and Bishop to the private's former school (and also Tony's), where they discover some dark secrets lurking in the academy. Bishop and Jake ask Gibbs, Tony, and McGee to dinner.
| 273 | 15 | "Cabin Fever" | Bethany Rooney | Scott Williams | February 17, 2015 | 1215 | 18.06 |
After events in "Twenty Klicks" and "Check," a Russian anti-tank grenade explodes at a summit on global terror, killing Navy PO3 Katherine Gomez. Fornell is pulled-over by Virginia State Police for DUI, so Gibbs opts to sit out the investigation to help Fornell, who is on the verge of self-destruction following the death of his ex-wife Diane. Gibbs drives them both out to his log cabin retreat to hash things out. Meanwhile, Bishop's husband, NSA Attorney Jake Malloy, helps NCIS uncover Sergei Mishnev's revenge motive against Gibbs; Sergei's half-brother was Ari Haswari, who was slain in Gibbs' basement by Special Agent Ziva David. Russian Counselor Anton Pavlenko meets Sergei Mishnev and gives his blessing to kill Gibbs, after Gibbs double-crossed him by saving the life of Russian scientist Nelly Benin, and allowing her defection (in "Choke Hold"). The team then learns that Mishnev pressured Nazar Boulos to plant the grenade, and to supply a cell-phone jammer. At Gibbs' cabin, they lose cell service and Gibbs notices Mishnev's approach. Gibbs and Fornell set a trap to end Mishnev's reign of terror, and he is shot dead by Fornell.
| 274 | 16 | "Blast from the Past" | Dennis Smith | David J. North | February 24, 2015 | 1216 | 17.38 |
When a murder victim is discovered to have an ID that Gibbs used for undercover operations twenty years earlier, the investigation leads to the discovery that several former undercover IDs have been leaked for use by Serbian intelligence.
| 275 | 17 | "The Artful Dodger" | Terrence O'Hara | Gina Lucita Monreal | March 10, 2015 | 1217 | 16.22 |
Following the murder of a lieutenant in an admiral's office, the team's investigation leads them to tracking down a painting that contains a listening device planted by terrorists. Tony's father returns after his fiancee left him and soon joins the case.
| 276 | 18 | "Status Update" | Holly Dale | Christopher J. Waild | March 24, 2015 | 1218 | 16.23 |
After a thief is murdered in a Marine's home, the team's investigation leads them to a joint effort with the DOD and Delilah to hunt down a terrorist.
| 277 | 19 | "Patience" | Thomas J. Wright | Steven D. Binder | March 31, 2015 | 1219 | 16.60 |
When a supposed petty officer and a woman he is transporting are murdered, the team's investigation leads Gibbs and Tony to bring in McGee and Bishop on a cold case they have been working years on — an unsolved bombing from 1979, and the current case may help them not only prove who was responsible, but where the bomber is.
| 278 | 20 | "No Good Deed" | Arvin Brown | George Schenck & Frank Cardea | April 7, 2015 | 1220 | 16.85 |
A Congressman doing community service finds a dead Marine Lance Corporal David Austin. From NIBIN, Abby determines he was shot with an FN Five-seveN that went missing from ATF's Operation Fast and Furious sting. With Austin's motorcycle tank nearly empty, wondering why he didn't fuel up at the nearby gas station, the team review the station's video. It reveals Austin pursued a car in which an abducted woman is seen yelling for help while the male driver filled up. From the car's registered owner, Jennifer Vickers, the woman is identified as her strung-out daughter Emma. After Zoë consults with ATF Special Agent Phillip Caffey concerning the handgun, the car is found with Emma dead inside and the man missing. Abby gets DNA from the sexual assault kit, which matches straw buyer Jamie Rivers, a rogue ATF informant previously arrested by Agent Caffey. The team sets up a sting of their own to arrest Rivers and recover the weapon. In recognition of Austin's good deed, Jennifer vows to donate Emma's college fund to the Marine Corps Scholarship Foundation in Austin's name to honor him. Meanwhile, things get complicated with Tony when his father comes back to town to meet Zoë.
| 279 | 21 | "Lost in Translation" | Tony Wharmby | Jennifer Corbett | April 14, 2015 | 1221 | 15.84 |
After a Marine captain is found tortured and killed, the team's investigation leads them to an Afghani citizen who worked as a translator for the deceased, and his brother who is a ruthless Taliban operative. Bishop's past comes to light when she and Gibbs travel to Afghanistan.
| 280 | 22 | "Troll" | Dennis Smith | Scott Williams | April 28, 2015 | 1222 | 14.85 |
Part 1 of 4 : When a Navy computer tech Ensign Janine Wilt working for the ONI is found dead with her throat cut, the team reunites with NCIS Special Agent Ned Dorneget to find her killer and investigate her computer activity. Their investigation soon intersects with an on-going NSA case, leading to a much larger threat.
| 281 | 23 | "The Lost Boys" | James Whitmore Jr. | Gina Lucita Monreal | May 5, 2015 | 1223 | 14.05 |
Part 2 of 4 : NCIS search for a terrorist organization known as "The Calling," a group that recruits young children and teenagers through the Internet to spread chaos through deadly attacks using modified Bouncing Betty anti-personnel mines. Onc such attack kills NCIS Special Agent Ned Dorneget after he manages to warn off everyone else at a special event. The team meet at the airfield to receive his body, where Gibbs sees the ghosts of other fallen comrades; Jenny Shepard, Caitlin Todd, Paula Cassidy, Chris Pacci, and Mike Franks. Notes: Lauren Holly and Sasha Alexander appear in CGI footage. Jessica Steen, Tim Kelleher and Muse Watson make cameo appearances.
| 282 | 24 | "Neverland" | Tony Wharmby | Gary Glasberg | May 12, 2015 | 1224 | 14.94 |
Part 3 of 4 : In the aftermath of the terrorist attack that killed Agent Ned Dorneget, NCIS and CIA Officer Teague (Ned's mother) continue searching for members of The Calling, a terrorist organization that recruits teenagers through the Internet. Sadiq Samar is found, but another member abducts 16 year-old member Luke Harris from Gibbs' house. The team tracks them to Iraq where The Calling's leader Daniel Budd sets a trap in a crowded market street. The season ends on a cliffhanger when Luke shoots Gibbs, first in the leg, then his chest....

== Production ==
On March 13, 2014, CBS renewed NCIS for this season. On June 11, 2014, at the Cannes Film Festival, NCIS was cited as being the most-watched drama in the world, with 57.6 million viewers worldwide. Gary Glasberg, the executive producer of the show, said, "As NCIS enters its 12th season, we couldn't be happier to learn we're now the #1 drama in the world. It's no secret that determination and teamwork have allowed our cast and crew to continue to deliver a show we're truly proud of. We also know we wouldn’t be here without the support and loyalty of the best fans in television. Thanks to our worldwide audience for helping us start the new season off right." In the first half of July 2014, the cast was given the script for the premiere episode, "Twenty Klicks". Filming began on this episode in the last week of July.

== Ratings ==
| Episode | Ratings | | | | | | |
| Episode | Original air date | Live | | Live rank (viewers) | | Live+7 | |
| Episode | Original air date | Viewers (millions) | Rating/share (18–49) | Night | Week | Viewers (millions) | Rating/share (18–49)) |
|---|---|---|---|---|---|---|---|
| "Twenty Klicks" | September 23, 2014 | 18.23 | 2.9 | 1 | 3 | 22.47 | 4.1 |
| "Kill the Messenger" | September 30, 2014 | 18.84 | 2.6 | 1 | 2 | 22.57 | 3.9 |
| "So It Goes" | October 7, 2014 | 17.30 | 2.6 | 1 | 2 | 21.61 | 3.9 |
| "Choke Hold" | October 14, 2014 | 17.26 | 2.5 | 1 | 2 | 21.43 | 3.6 |
| "The San Dominick" | October 21, 2014 | 17.13 | 2.4 | 1 | 3 | 21.01 | 3.5 |
| "Parental Guidance Suggested" | October 28, 2014 | 17.53 | 2.6 | 1 | 4 | 21.39 | 3.6 |
| "The Searchers" | November 11, 2014 | 17.49 | 2.3 | 1 | 2 | 21.65 | 3.6 |
| "Semper Fortis" | November 18, 2014 | 18.10 | 2.6 | 1 | 2 | 21.65 | 3.6 |
| "Grounded" | November 25, 2014 | 16.01 | 2.5 | 1 | 4 | 20.38 | 3.7 |
| "House Rules" | December 16, 2014 | 17.53 | 2.4 | 1 | 2 | 21.71 | 3.6 |
| "Check" | January 6, 2015 | 19.76 | 2.8 | 1 | 2 | 23.75 | 4.1 |
| "The Enemy Within" | January 13, 2015 | 19.87 | 2.8 | 1 | 2 | 23.54 | 3.8 |
| "We Build, We Fight" | February 3, 2015 | 18.64 | 2.6 | 1 | 2 | 22.34 | 3.8 |
| "Cadence" | February 10, 2015 | 18.77 | 2.9 | 1 | 2 | 22.73 | 3.9 |
| "Cabin Fever" | February 17, 2015 | 18.06 | 2.6 | 1 | 3 | 21.86 | 3.5 |
| "Blast from the Past" | February 24, 2015 | 17.38 | 2.3 | 1 | 1 | 21.42 | 3.4 |
| "The Artful Dodger" | March 10, 2015 | 16.22 | 2.2 | 1 | 1 | 19.99 | 3.3 |
| "Status Update" | March 24, 2015 | 16.23 | 2.2 | 2 | 1 | 20.26 | 3.3 |
| "Patience" | March 31, 2015 | 16.60 | 2.2 | 1 | 1 | 20.57 | 3.4 |
| "No Good Deed" | April 7, 2015 | 16.85 | 2.1 | 1 | 2 | 20.25 | 3.1 |
| "Lost in Translation" | April 14, 2015 | 15.84 | 2.0 | 1 | 2 | 19.60 | 3.1 |
| "Troll" | April 28, 2015 | 14.85 | 2.0 | 1 | 1 | 18.84 | 3.0 |
| "The Lost Boys (Part 1)" | May 5, 2015 | 14.05 | 2.0 | 1 | 2 | 18.41 | 3.0 |
| "Neverland" | May 12, 2015 | 14.94 | 2.0 | 1 | 1 | 18.87 | 3.0 |

== International broadcast ==
The season airs simultaneously on Global in Canada. It began airing on September 30, 2014 on Network Ten in Australia. In the United Kingdom and Ireland, it premiered on January 9, 2015 on Fox.
