= Devil's Triad =

- NCIS episode
- Episode no.: Season 11; Episode 10
- Directed by: Arvin Brown
- Written by: Steven D. Binder
- Original air date: December 10, 2013

Guest appearances
- Emily Wickersham as NSA Agent Eleanor "Ellie" Bishop; Joe Spano as Senior FBI Agent T.C. Fornell; Melinda McGraw as Diane Sterling; Bryce Johnson as Eddie Macklin; Sterling K. Brown as Elijah Banner; Juliette Angelo as Emily Fornell; Lucy Butler as Roda Robinson; Jeffrey Hutchinson as Mister Dale Wagner; Will Buchanan as Marine Corporal Ron Flegman; Eva La Dare as Clown/Mystery Woman

Episode chronology
← Previous "Gut Check"	Next → "Homesick"
- NCIS season 11

"Devil's Triad" is the tenth episode of the eleventh season of the American police procedural drama NCIS, and the 244th episode overall. It originally aired on CBS in the United States on December 10, 2013. The episode is written by Steven D. Binder and directed by Arvin Brown, and was seen by 19.30 million viewers.

== Plot ==
The team investigate the death of a Marine who was reportedly shot by a clown. A number on a cellphone found on the Marine is traced to a hotel room where Gibbs and Tony accidentally chance upon Fornell and his and Gibbs' ex-wife Diane Sterling. The cellphone belongs to an Eddie Macklin but the team keep hitting dead ends with the evidence. However, the case takes an unexpected turn when Gibbs and Fornell discover that "Eddie Macklin" is the alias of Secret Service Special Agent Edward McKenzie and that NCIS had stumbled on a highly classified six-month-long undercover operation. Fornell and Diane's daughter Emily has a significant part in the plot of this episode.

== Production ==
"Devil's Triad" is written by Steven D. Binder and directed by Arvin Brown. The episode is the third "incarnation of the relationship between Gibbs and Fornell and their ex-wife". The other two are "Devil's Triangle" and "Devil's Trifecta" from the ninth and tenth seasons. "The humor that exists when these characters get together is just a blast", executive producer Gary Glasberg said about the return of Melinda McGraw's character in an interview with TV Line in November 2013.

McGraw's return as Diane Sterling was announced on November 1, 2013.

== Reception ==
"Devil's Triad" was seen by 19.30 million live viewers at its December 10, 2013 broadcast, with a 2.9/8 share among adults aged 18 to 49. A rating point represents one percent of the total number of television sets in American households, and a share means the percentage of television sets in use tuned to the program. In total viewers, "Devil's Triad" was the highest rated show on the night it aired.

Douglas Wolfe from TV Fanatic gave the episode 4.2/5 and stated that "The idea of murderous clowns has got to be everyone's favorite nightmare. [The episode] opened with one such clown putting a bullet into a Marine. Then things took a turn for the worse."
