= List of NCIS: New Orleans characters =

NCIS: New Orleans is an American television series, executive produced by Gary Glasberg and Mark Harmon. The series features an extensive regular cast, including Scott Bakula as Dwayne Cassius Pride, Lucas Black as Christopher LaSalle, Zoe McLellan as Meredith Brody and Vanessa Ferlito as Tammy Gregorio. Recurring actors, including Shanley Caswell as Laurel Pride, Rocky Carroll as Leon Vance, and Derek Webster as Raymond Isler, appear intermittently.

== Overview ==
Actor	Character	Occupation	Season							
Actor	Character	Occupation	Intro	1	2	3	4	5	6	7
Scott Bakula	Dwayne Cassius Pride	NCIS Supervisory Special Agent	Main	Main	Main	Main	Main	Main	Main	Main
Lucas Black	Christopher LaSalle	NCIS Senior Special Agent	Main (Note: Episodes 1–6 of season 6 only.)	Main	Main	Main	Main	Main	Main	—
Zoe McLellan	Meredith Brody	NCIS Special Agent	Main	Main	Main	—	—	—	—	—
CCH Pounder	Loretta Wade	Chief Medical Examiner	Main	Main	Main	Main	Main	Main	Main	Main
Rob Kerkovich	Sebastian Lund	NCIS Forensic Agent	—	Main	Main	Main	Main	Main	Main	Main
Daryl "Chill" Mitchell	Patton Plame	NCIS Computer Specialist	—	R	Main	Main	Main	Main	Main	Main
Shalita Grant	Sonja Percy	NCIS Special Agent	—	R	Main (Note: Episodes 1–19 of season 4 only.)	Main	Main	—	—	—
Vanessa Ferlito	Tammy Gregorio	NCIS Special Agent	—	—	—	Main	Main	Main	Main	Main
Necar Zadegan	Hannah Khoury	NCIS Special Agent	—	—	—	—	—	Main (Note: episodes 5–24 main of season 5 only; episodes 2–4 recurring.)	Main	Main
Charles Michael Davis	Quentin Carter	NCIS Special Agent	—	—	—	—	—	—	Main (Note: Episode 14 onwards of season 6.)	Main
Chelsea Field	Rita Devereaux	New Orleans District Attorney	—	—	—	R	R	R	R	Main (Note: Episode 16 of season 7 only; episodes 2–15 "Also starring".)

== Main characters ==
=== Dwayne Cassius Pride ===
Dwayne Cassius Pride
- NCIS: New Orleans character
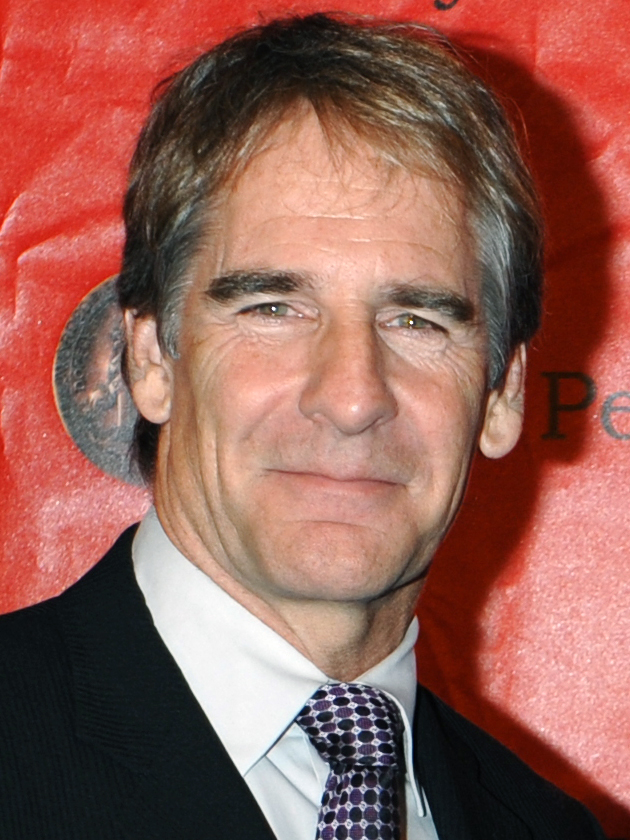
- Dwayne Pride (Scott Bakula)
- First appearance: "Crescent City" (NCIS); March 25, 2014
- Created by: Gary Glasberg
- Portrayed by: Scott Bakula; Shea Buckner (young)

In-universe information
- Full name: Dwayne Cassius Pride
- Nickname: King
- Title(s): Resident Agent-in-Charge, NCISRA New Orleans (2014–2018, 2019–present); Special Agent-in-Charge, NCIS Southeast Field Office (2018–2019)
- Occupation: Federal agent
- Affiliation: Naval Criminal Investigative Service; Jefferson Parish Sheriff's Office
- Family: Cassius Pride (father, deceased); Mena Cantrell (mother); James "Jimmy" Boyd (paternal half-brother)
- Spouses: Linda Pride (ex-wife); CDR Rita Devereaux, JAGC, USNR
- Children: Laurel Pride (daughter); Connor Davenport (son with Sasha Broussard)

Dwayne Cassius "King" Pride (Scott Bakula) is a New Orleans native and former Jefferson Parish deputy sheriff who runs the NCIS Resident Agency in New Orleans.

Pride and his now-estranged wife Linda used to live in the Lower Garden District. His daughter, Laurel, is a music major at Louisiana State University. In "Chasing Ghosts" and "Le Carnaval de la Mort", it is revealed that Pride's father, Cassius (Stacy Keach), is incarcerated in the Gretna Correctional Facility. As of the beginning of season two, Dwayne and Linda officially divorced. With the money Dwayne got from selling their home he paid for Dr. Wade's oldest adopted son and assistant Danny's college, Laurel's college, a place for his father (if he makes parole), as well as buying a fixer-upper bar, TruTone. On the 100th episode, Dwayne reveals he has a half-brother named Jimmy Boyd by his father. Pride has the second highest arrest record in the history of Jefferson Parish's Sheriffs Office.

Pride joined the Naval Criminal Investigative Service in 1989, 2 years before NCIS's Leroy Jethro Gibbs; both were part of a group of NIS agents known as the "Fed Five" who gained fame for apprehending Spencer Hanlon, A.K.A. "The Privileged Killer". [For years, the Privileged Killer was erroneously believed to be Victor Lourde, who had been framed by a member of the "Fed Five," Dan MacClain. When MacClain is murdered, the teams discover his frame-up and the reason for it. Their investigation leads them to the Hanlon father and son.] Pride went on to have an illustrious career that took him around the world, including Russia and South Africa, culminating in his return to Louisiana to head up NCIS operations at the United States Marine Corps Support Facility in Algiers, New Orleans before NCIS opened a proper NCIS Resident Agency in New Orleans.

In season 5, S.S.A. Pride, still recovering from gunshot wounds sustained in "Checkmate", accepts a promotion to Special Agent-in-Charge of the NCIS Southeast Field Office, which has an area of responsibility that spans across the states of Georgia and Florida down to the Caribbean and into Central and South America. In "Judgement Call", Pride takes a voluntary demotion, returning to command the New Orleans office in the aftermath of S.S.A. Hannah Khoury's demotion.

=== Christopher LaSalle ===
Christopher LaSalle
- NCIS: New Orleans character
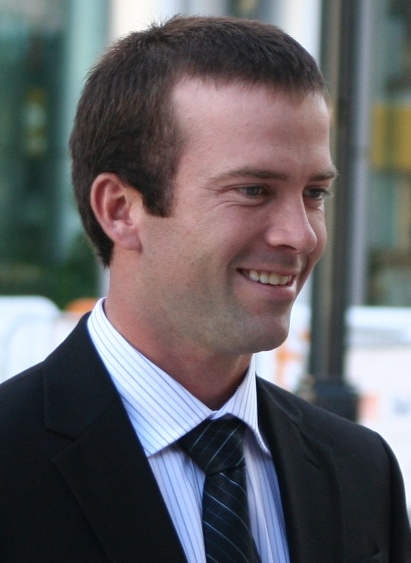
- Christopher LaSalle (Lucas Black)
- First appearance: "Crescent City" (NCIS); March 25, 2014
- Last appearance: "Matthew 5:9" (NCIS: New Orleans); November 5, 2019
- Created by: Gary Glasberg
- Portrayed by: Lucas Black

In-universe information
- Full name: Christopher LaSalle
- Alias: Chris
- Title(s): Senior Special Agent, NCIS New Orleans Field Office
- Occupation: Federal agent
- Affiliation: Naval Criminal Investigative Service; New Orleans Police Department (formerly)
- Family: Beau LaSalle (father, deceased); Rose LaSalle (stepmother); Cade LaSalle (older brother, deceased); Unnamed sister
- Significant others: Savannah Kelly (girlfriend, deceased)

Christopher LaSalle (Lucas Black) was a senior NCIS Special Agent. Born in Alabama in 1982, LaSalle was originally a detective with the New Orleans Police Department's (NOPD) Fifth District during Hurricane Katrina and then spent seven years on the NOPD vice squad. He attended the University of Alabama, graduating magna cum laude with a 3.7 GPA. While in college, he worked as the university mascot Big Al. LaSalle lives in the French Quarter. He has two siblings: Cade, who has bipolar disorder, and unnamed sister. He has received multiple commendations for his work at the New Orleans children's hospital. During the first season, he begins a romantic relationship with his high school sweetheart, Savannah, though she is later murdered.

In "Ties That Bind", LaSalle’s father, Beau, died; he made Chris—with whom he had an estranged relationship—executor of his estate and his successor at LaSalle Enterprises.

In the season six episode, "Matthew 5:9", LaSalle was killed after being shot in the abdomen and succumbing to his wounds in the hospital. This is due to the fact that the real life actor of LaSalle, Lucas Black, stepped away from the show and his starring role in 2019 to spend more time with his wife and 3 kids after the grueling 70-hour work schedule that he had to endure.

=== Meredith Brody ===
Meredith Brody
- NCIS: New Orleans character
- First appearance: "Crescent City" (NCIS); March 25, 2014
- Last appearance: "Sleeping with the Enemy" (NCIS: New Orleans); May 17, 2016
- Created by: Gary Glasberg
- Portrayed by: Zoe McLellan

In-universe information
- Full name: Meredith Brody
- Nickname: Merry
- Title(s): Field Agent, NCIS New Orleans Field Office (resigned)
- Occupation: Federal agent (resigned)
- Affiliation: Naval Criminal Investigative Service
- Family: Olivia Brody (mother); Emily Ann Brody (twin sister, deceased)
- Significant other: James Lathom (ex-fiancée)

Meredith Brody (Zoe McLellan) is a senior NCIS Special Agent. During NCIS season eleven, she transferred to Pride's team from the Chicago field office. She has a background in interrogation and claims to have a black belt in aikido. She is a graduate of Michigan State University and had a twin sister, Emily Ann Brody, who was murdered. Brody was the youngest Special Agent in the history of NCIS Midwest. During the second season, Brody is alerted to the real circumstances behind her sister's death, and working with Sebastian, she arrests the killer. At the end of season two, Brody begins a relationship with a Homeland Security Agent named Russo, who is revealed to be corrupt. Though Brody kills Russo, she resigns from NCIS after beginning to doubt her own abilities. Her resignation leads to an FBI investigation into the team, who are later cleared of all corruption charges at the behest of her replacement, Gregorio.

=== Sebastian Lund ===
Sebastian Lund
- NCIS: New Orleans character
- First appearance: "Musician Heal Thyself" (NCIS: New Orleans); September 23, 2014
- Created by: Gary Glasberg
- Portrayed by: Rob Kerkovich

In-universe information
- Full name: Sebastian Lund
- Title(s): Probationary Special Agent/Forensics Agent, NCIS New Orleans Field Office
- Occupation: Federal agent
- Affiliation: Naval Criminal Investigative Service; Jefferson Parish Coroner's Office
- Family: Sylvia Lund (mother)

Sebastian Lund (Rob Kerkovich) is originally a Jefferson Parish forensic specialist, and Dr. Wade's lab assistant, though he later attends FLETC and joins Pride's team as a Forensics Agent. Sebastian is a hardened conspiracy theorist, and is somewhat socially awkward. In season one, it is revealed that he is in a relationship with a woman named Melissa. Also in Season one, Lund reveals that one of his accomplishments is "beating Super Mario Bros. 2 in 8 1/2 minutes", a time two seconds ahead of the world record at the time. In season two, Sebastian helps Meredith Brody uncover the conspiracy surrounding her sister's death. Though the team initially resents Sebastian for enabling Brody, he is later proved to be correct. In 2015, it is revealed that he has been working with Loretta for five years. In season three, he becomes the fifth member of Pride's team after graduating from FLETC. Pride, similarly, contacted Director Vance to note how worried he was about Sebastian's abilities in the field, but also added that he believed he deserved a chance to prove himself. Over time, Sebastian has shown he is capable of handling himself in the field, looking to Tim McGee as a role model due to their similar backgrounds. He is often regularly partnered up with Gregorio, both being the newest members of the team and supported each other in firefights.

=== Loretta Wade ===
Loretta Wade
- NCIS: New Orleans character
- First appearance: "Crescent City" (NCIS); March 25, 2014
- Created by: Gary Glasberg
- Portrayed by: CCH Pounder

In-universe information
- Full name: Loretta Wade
- Title: Coroner of Jefferson Parish
- Occupation: Medical examiner
- Affiliation: Jefferson Parish Coroner's Office; Naval Criminal Investigative Service
- Children: Danny Malloy (foster son); CJ Malloy (foster son)

Loretta Wade (CCH Pounder) is the Coroner of Jefferson Parish. Wade's office is contracted by NCIS for autopsies and forensics. She is a graduate of Harvard University and moved down to New Orleans after completing medical school. In season one, Loretta begins to foster two children who are involved in an NCIS case. Pride later starts a college fund for the children. Loretta is also Brody's landlord during her tenure at NCIS. In season three, Loretta is hurt by Sebastian's decision to leave the coroner's office, though she later comes to accept his decision.

In "Second Line", it is mentioned that Loretta has more than once been asked to join the Orleans Parish Coroner's Office or even run for the position of Orleans Parish Coroner.

=== Sonja Percy ===
Sonja Percy
- NCIS: New Orleans character
- First appearance: "More Now" (NCIS: New Orleans #1.17); March 10, 2015
- Last appearance: "High Stakes" (NCIS: New Orleans #4.19); April 3, 2018
- Created by: Gary Glasberg
- Portrayed by: Shalita Grant

In-universe information
- Full name: Sonja Percy
- Title(s): Special Agent, NCIS New Orleans Field Office
- Occupation: Federal agent
- Affiliation: Naval Criminal Investigative Service; Bureau of Alcohol, Tobacco, Firearms and Explosives

Sonja Percy (Shalita Grant) is a NCIS Special Agent and former Bureau of Alcohol, Tobacco, Firearms and Explosives (ATF) Special Agent. While an ATF agent, Percy helped Pride and the team on their pursuit for Baitfish. At the end of the season one finale "My City", she noted a desire to join Pride's team, a transfer that took place before season two. Despite working as an NCIS Special Agent, Sonja continues to participate in undercover operations for outside agencies, most recently the DEA. In season two, Pride tells Sonja that he will not support her if her secrecy begins to put Chris and Meredith at risk, suggesting she is somewhat expendable and that he will not hesitate to remove her from his team if the operation she's part of endangers the team in any way. In season three, it is revealed that LaSalle was initially unsure of Percy's addition to the team; similarly, Percy is hesitant of Gregorio's arrival, though they come to respect each other. During season two, Percy and LaSalle begin a flirtation, and Gregorio initially believes they are in a relationship.

In episode 19 of season 4, Percy resigns from NCIS to accept a position at the FBI.

=== Patton Plame ===
Patton Plame
- NCIS: New Orleans character
- First appearance: "The Recruits" (NCIS: New Orleans); October 14, 2014
- Created by: Gary Glasberg
- Portrayed by: Daryl "Chill" Mitchell

In-universe information
- Full name: Patton Plame
- Nickname: Triple P
- Title(s): Investigative Computer Specialist, NCIS New Orleans Field Office
- Occupation: Federal agent
- Affiliation: Naval Criminal Investigative Service

Patton Plame (Daryl "Chill" Mitchell), nicknamed "Triple P", is an NCIS investigative computer specialist. According to Brody, he was previously employed by United States Cyber Command. LaSalle refers to Plame as a "hacker" despite Patton insisting that he is an investigative computer specialist who is "too legit to quit". Plame is skilled in computer programming, cryptography, security hacking, and is paraplegic. He has been married and divorced three times. He gave himself the nickname "Double P" in the early part of Season 1, much to Sebastian's dismay, who rejects the idea that a person can award themselves their own character nickname. However, in the Season 1 episode "Careful What You Wish For", Patton announces to Sebastian that he has upped his nickname to "Triple P", with the third "P" standing for "Perfection". He then asks Pride and LaSalle if he added a third "P" to his name, what would they like it to stand for, "Passionate" or "Playful"? They never answer.

=== Tammy Gregorio ===
Tammy Gregorio
- NCIS: New Orleans character
- First appearance: "Aftershocks" (NCIS: New Orleans); September 20, 2016
- Created by: Gary Glasberg & Brad Kern
- Portrayed by: Vanessa Ferlito

In-universe information
- Full name: Tammy Gregorio
- Title(s): Special Agent, NCIS New Orleans Field Office
- Occupation: Federal agent
- Affiliation: Naval Criminal Investigative Service; Federal Bureau of Investigation
- Spouse: Ethan McKinley (ex-husband)
- Significant others: Hannah Lee (ex-girlfriend); Eva Azarova (romantic interest); Kara (girlfriend)

Tamara "Tammy" Gregorio (Vanessa Ferlito) is a Washington FBI Special Agent who first appears as an investigator on a task force assigned to investigate Pride and his team. Brody's unexpected departure increases the attention placed upon the team, and soon Gregorio is seconded to undertake a more thorough investigation. Following the completion of this, Pride requests that she stays on, replacing Brody on a semi-permanent basis. After she was dismissed from the FBI, Gregorio officially joins NCIS and is now on Pride's team; with her former boss - Deputy Director Isler - lobbying for her approval.

Gregorio's ex-husband Ethan McKinley disappeared after embezzling $80 million in Katrina relief funds. However, in season 3 episode "Overdrive", it was revealed that she had a relationship with Assistant U.S. Attorney Hannah Lee, making her the first main LGBT character in the franchise (though a recurring gay character, Ned Dorneget, had been previously introduced in the main series). When her ex-husband returns in episode 18, "Slay the Dragon", she tells him that she is a lesbian.

In season 3 episode 14 "Pandora's Box (Part II)" Gregorio reveals that she is a lawyer by profession, and joined the FBI after graduating from law school.

=== Hannah Khoury ===
Hannah Khoury
- NCIS: New Orleans character
- First appearance: "Inside Out" (NCIS: New Orleans); October 2, 2018
- Created by: Christopher Silber
- Portrayed by: Necar Zadegan

In-universe information
- Full name: Hannah Khoury
- Title(s): Supervisory Special Agent, NCIS New Orleans Field Office
- Occupation: Federal agent
- Affiliation: Naval Criminal Investigative Service; Federal Bureau of Investigation
- Spouse: Ryan Porter (ex-husband)
- Significant other: Quentin Carter (boyfriend)
- Children: Naomi Porter (daughter)

Hannah Khoury (Necar Zadegan) is a former NCIS Senior Field Agent. After Pride is promoted to Special Agent in Charge, she transfers to the New Orleans field office as a Supervisory Special Agent (S.S.A.) to replace him as the team's direct supervisor. Hannah is separated from her husband, Ryan; the two have a daughter, Naomi, who is 10 years old in season 5.

In "Judgement Day", Hannah is removed from command of the New Orleans office after a joint operation with the FBI goes sideways, although Pride arranges for her to retain her rank and remain in New Orleans under his command,. She considers resigning in protest, but her daughter's desire for her to remain in New Orleans convinces her to stay. In the event Pride is unavailable, Hannah becomes the Acting Special Agent in Charge of the NCIS: New Orleans team and is also Pride's second-in-command.

In “Stashed” Carter and Hannah spent quite a bit of the episode flirting with each other.

In “Once Upon a Time” it is revealed Hannah and Carter hooked up.

=== Quentin Carter ===
Quentin Carter
- NCIS: New Orleans character
- First appearance: "The Man in the Red Suit" (NCIS: New Orleans); March 8, 2020
- Created by: Christopher Silber
- Portrayed by: Charles Michael Davis

In-universe information
- Full name: Quentin Carter
- Title(s): Special Agent, NCIS New Orleans Field Office
- Occupation: Federal agent
- Affiliation: Naval Criminal Investigative Service
- Significant other: Hannah Khoury (girlfriend)

Quentin Carter (Charles Michael Davis) is a brash NCIS Special Agent who is the replacement for agent Christopher LaSalle. Carter comes across as brassy and urbane. He is a former U.S. Marine who served in the 1st Force Reconnaissance Company. He is the son of a U.S. Navy two-star admiral, and has a brother and sister both of whom also serve in the Navy.

Carter has a preference for wearing designer suits while on duty, but a running gag occurs that he is put into a situation where his suit is ruined.

Carter starts dating Hannah Khoury in “Once Upon A Time” and continues dating her throughout the rest of the season.

=== Rita Devereaux ===
Rita Devereaux
- NCIS: New Orleans character
- First appearance: "The Last Stand" (NCIS: New Orleans); March 7, 2017
- Created by: Brad Kern
- Portrayed by: Chelsea Field

In-universe information
- Full name: Rita Devereaux
- Occupation: Lawyer
- Affiliation: Department of Defense; Judge Advocate General
- Spouses: Lloyd (ex-husband); Dwayne Pride (husband)
- Children: Jake; Sarah

Rita Devereaux (Chelsea Field) is a New Orleans Assistant District Attorney and a reservist in the U.S. Navy's Judge Advocate General Corps, holding the rank of Commander. She is a longtime friend and eventual girlfriend of Dwayne Pride. At the end of season 3, Rita accepts a job with the United States Department of Justice National Security Division and moves to Washington, D.C., but maintains a long-distance relationship with Pride. In the series finale, she and Pride end up marrying.

In real life, Field is married to Scott Bakula.

== Recurring characters ==
=== Laurel Pride ===
Laurel Pride (Shanley Caswell) is Pride's daughter who is currently a music major at Louisiana State University. Like her father, she plays piano, and is expected to graduate with Honors. Despite having an affectionate relationship with her father, she feels he is too nice to her boyfriends, and as such notes a desire for him to stop developing "bromances" with them. In season one, her boyfriend Orion is injured in an explosion meant to kill Pride. In season two, she is attacked whilst jogging, though the man suffers cardiac arrest and dies. She is seemingly about to be taken hostage shortly after, but is able to disarm her female attacker long enough for NCIS Agent Sonja Percy to seemingly shoot the assailant dead. Laurel is also desirous of having a closer relationship with her grandfather, the incarcerated and somewhat incorrigible Cassius Pride. But Dwayne suspects that, in part, his father is trying to use Laurel to influence Dwayne to soften in his reluctance to write Cassius a letter recommending his parole requests be granted. Dwayne tells his father that the only reason Laurel thinks so well of Cassius is because Dwayne has purposefully omitted all the seedy and shocking details of growing up as Cassius's son, witnessing his crimes and corruption. In the end, Dwayne chooses not to reveal those dark elements to Laurel, much to Cassius's relief; Dwayne even shares an anecdote showing Cassius as a good father.

=== Cassius Pride ===
Cassius Pride (Stacy Keach) was Dwayne Pride's incarcerated father, who has a shady past, being a veritable kingpin in the "running" of New Orleans city and parish, "back in the day." He is in prison for being caught and convicted of robbing a casino. His son Dwayne visits him from time-to-time, and Cassius feels his son shouldn't be so bitter about being raised in an underworld figure's home. Dwayne thinks maybe trying to make up for his father's crooked deeds is one reason why he went so far the other way, becoming a top law enforcement officer and agent. Dwayne's own mother had a nervous breakdown and had to move "halfway round the globe" just to get away from Cassius's influence and adulterous ways. Dwayne told his father that prison is the only place he can be kept where he would be safe from himself. Because of Cassius's old underworld experiences and connections, Dwayne sometimes consults with him on certain cases. Even in prison Cassius remains the semi-lovable con artist, trying to leverage his son into writing a letter of support for his annual parole hearings; even trying to use his granddaughter Laurel to work on Dwayne's sentiments. Eventually, Dwayne does help Cassius at the end of Season 1 by writing him that long-sought letter of support to the parole board, although it is revealed later that Cassius did not actually make parole until sometime after Season 4's episode "Mirror, Mirror", where he is still in prison. Whenever Cassius does make parole, he stays in New Orleans for a while, but by the time of Season 5's "Tick Tock", he had been living a "good life" in "Evansville, Kentucky", in some kind of witness cover program, with armed federal agents protecting him; it was from here that he was kidnapped by Apollyon and held for ransom along with Dr. Loretta Wade. Some time during or after prison, he had taken up painting, which his granddaughter Laurel thinks is simple but cute, saying his trees look like "green marshmallows". Cassius has a very pragmatic view of life and crime, as exemplified in his involvement in his son's childhood sports endeavors. Cassius: "I'm on my way to fix things right now." Dwayne: "Like you fixed my Little League career?" Cassius: "Hey, you were a natural-born shortstop. The coach just didn't see it." Dwayne: "So you planted a brick of hash in his truck and had him arrested." Cassius, laughing: "Well it worked, didn't it?" Dwayne told his father that in spite of all his shady history, that he trusts Cassius to be the one person that loves the people and city of New Orleans "almost as much as me." As revealed in the Season 5 episode "In The Blood", one of younger Cassius's (Justin Miles) long-term extra-marital affairs produced a boy named Jimmy Boyd (Craig Cauley Jr., as the young Jimmy; & Jason Alan Carvell, as the adult Jimmy), a half-brother to Dwayne, but to whom Cassius devoted quite a bit of time when Jimmy was young, teaching him to fish at his bayou cabin, and even giving him Dwayne's bicycle. Cassius is murdered in the Season 5 episode "Tick Tock" (continued into the first minutes of the subsequent episode "Vindicta"); Cassius's courage and resourcefulness here saves Dr. Loretta Wade's life, as well as two other hostages. Cassius's last act was saving the life of his son Dwayne while the two of them were freeing captives, by stepping in the way of several bullets fired at Dwayne by assassin Amelia Parsons Stone.

=== Mena Pride ===
Mena Pride (Elena Shaddow & Joanna Cassidy) is Dwayne Pride's "Mama", who lives several hours away somewhere in a care facility for dementia patients. Her gentleness, great cooking, and musical talents as a pianist and singer, are all important elements in the formation of the person, talents, & interests of Dwayne Pride. She used to sing in the Tru Tone — the very night club and bar that Pride purchases and refurbishes as his side business and home, and she is constantly referenced by Pride as the source of whatever is good in him. She may be French in her background, as in Season 4's episode "Empathy", Pride calls her and gently tries to get her to sing a song in French, stimulating her cognitive and memory functions. Dwayne claims that her deterioration was due to a nervous breakdown resulting from her marriage to underworld figure and serial adulterer Cassius Pride. Mena appears in person on occasion in Season 5. In the episode "In The Blood", Dwayne has an extensive flashback to his childhood, and Mena (Annika Pampel) is in her prime as a pianist and singer at the Tru Tone. In the Season 5 finale "The River Styx, Part II", an older Mena (Joanna Cassidy) appears in Pride's mind while he is being drugged in order to divulge some key information to the Apollyon leader Avery Walker (Tim Griffin). In this vision, Mena is conversing with Dwayne and rocking on the front porch of a nice old house. After the case is over, Pride takes some time off to go visit his Mama.

=== Linda Pride ===
Linda Pride (Paige Turco) is Pride's ex-wife, and the mother of his daughter Laurel. She appears in the very first NCIS introductory episode — "Crescent City" Part 1 — that launched the New Orleans franchise from the main NCIS series. She also appears in an early episode from Season 1. She appears again in the very last episode of Season 6. She and Pride are still trying to make their marriage work in the beginning of Season 1, but they finally separate and divorce amicably, mentioned at the beginning of Season 2. Pride says that Linda has "moved on" and he's happy for her. Their marriage ultimately falls apart because Pride is married first to his job, which is dangerous, and the daily stress and worry on his wife Linda genuinely mirrors the family dynamics of many law enforcement and military personnel. Linda is discussed quite often when Pride is conversing with his daughter Laurel, and is always mentioned lovingly and with respect by Pride, crediting her with most of his daughter's good qualities.

=== Elvis Bertrand ===
Elvis (Tom Arnold) is a former Naval Intelligence officer. He is now a hacktivist and Pride's friend.

=== Sydney Halliday ===
Sgt. Sydney Halliday (Riann Steele) is an Army special operations soldier working her last duty station in South America, and she is suspected in a drug-infiltration murder scheme among military personnel, but is cleared by Pride, Sebastian and Gregorio in the Season 4 episode "Welcome to the Jungle." Sydney leaves the service, and comes to New Orleans to thank Pride again and pursue life options, but is caught in a hostage standoff in Pride's bar, the Tru Tone, in Season 4's episode "Powder Keg." In the trilogy of episodes that form the Season 4 finale, Sydney is recruited by Pride to be the muscle on his "off-books" clandestine team to take down AAG Eric Barlow and his deadly security tech Amelia Parsons.

=== Naomi Parsons ===
Agent Naomi Parsons (Kate Beahan) is an Australian ADFIS Investigator seconded to New Orleans, and a romantic interest for Dwayne Pride, in the Season 2 episode "Foreign Affairs." In due course, she became too aggressive in her pursuit of a U. S. Navy suspect in a case involving a dead Australian naval officer, stepped on Pride's toes, attempted to usurp jurisdiction, and set back the New Orleans team's case. Pride pushes back and gets her removed from the case, prompting coroner Loretta Wade to laugh in declaring, "Ooh! Takes talent to get under Dwayne Pride's skin!" Pride's daughter Laurel thinks Agent Parsons would be a good choice for a girlfriend for her dad. Parsons finally confesses to Pride that she was once a well-off lawyer whose pursuit of justice brought her into the investigative side of the law; now she's still "hard-charging", providing answers and comfort and closure to service members' families who have suffered the loss of a loved one. A sympathetic Pride responds, "I know that racket." He invites her back on the case.

=== Cade LaSalle ===
Cade LaSalle (Clayne Crawford) (alias Cade Lambert) is Agent Christopher LaSalle's older brother who suffers from bi-polar disorder. Cade's mental health therapist — Savannah Kelly — turns out to be Chris's childhood sweetheart; because of Cade's connection, they reunite romantically, which puts Savannah in harm's way. Cade is a charmer with the ladies, and is a talented artist, builder, and hard worker between his lapses into his bizarre behavior. He is framed for a murder when a dead woman is found in the trunk of his car, but it is later discovered that he was effectively drugged by the real culprit, and would have been too weak and confused to have done any of what he was suspected. Plus, his brother Chris knew Cade was a compassionate person who couldn't commit murder, citing a time in their youth when Cade adopted and brought back to health a mangy stray dog. Cade is killed in Season 6.

=== Savannah Kelly ===
Savannah Kelly (Gillian Alexy) is a long-time love interest of LaSalle, and his "childhood sweetheart". The two reunite after she is revealed to be his brother's therapist, and she and Chris later embark on a romantic relationship. She is murdered by Baitfish in "How Much Pain Can You Take?". Chris takes her death particularly hard, and begins drinking more and seeking affection from multiple women, much to dismay of the team.

=== Danny Malloy ===
Danny Malloy (Christopher Meyer) is Loretta's elder adopted son and C.J.'s older brother. In Season 3, Danny enlisted in the United States Navy rather than go to college, causing some friction between him and Loretta—and also between Loretta and Pride, who refused to talk Danny out of enlisting.

=== C. J. Malloy ===
C.J. Malloy (Dani Dare (seasons 1−3)/Alkoya Brunson (season 6)) is Loretta's younger adopted son and Danny's younger brother.

=== Officer Roy ===
Officer Roy (Steven Waldren) is the NCIS Security Guard, seen in many episodes throughout the Series run, since late in Season 2. In one episode, Roy is held hostage in the NCIS cloistered garden by the Apollyon team and its leader Avery Walker, in the Season 5 episode "Inside Out". In another episode he is seriously wounded when NCIS headquarters is attacked, but pulls through to return to his job. He has a special affection for the NCIS team, and is broken up when Pride is shot and nearly killed in Season 4.

=== Raymond Isler ===
Raymond Isler (Derek Webster) is the executive assistant director of the FBI National Security Branch and Agent Tammy Gregorio's direct superior. In this capacity, he leads a Department of Justice investigation into Pride's New Orleans team following the resignation of Agent Brody and the death of Agent Russo. Though Isler initially appears stand-offish with Pride, the two cooperate on numerous occasions in order to halt the activities of the cartel. Isler later fires Gregorio for disobeying a direct order, though he lobbies the Department of Justice to install her on Pride's team. Isler slowly warms to Pride's professionalism and sense of justice, if not his methods, realizing New Orleans is a unique town that requires a different touch than the Washington D.C. beltway Isler is used to. Isler warns Pride on more than one occasion that he has heard whispers of someone — unknown to him — in D.C. in a high position in the government who is gunning for Pride, and he tells Pride he will watch his back in D.C. and for Pride to watch his own back in New Orleans. (It is revealed later that an Associate Attorney General of the United States named Eric Barlow is the key person in D.C. who has targeted Pride.)

After the takedown of Javier Garcia (Julian Acosta), EAD Isler was promoted to Deputy Director of the Federal Bureau of Investigation. However, when it is revealed that a member of his team was a double agent for the Russians, Isler was demoted to Special Agent. Isler goes "off book" to pursue an opioid theft ring in the Season 4 episode "The Last Mile", and the trail leads him to New Orleans. In this episode it is revealed that he was once hooked on pain killers after an injury. He is coached by NCIS Agent Sonja Percy in his determination to accompany her in an undercover sting operation, and he performs well. In the closing episodes of Season 5, "The River Styx" Parts 1 & 2, Isler has traveled undercover to the disputed territory of South Ossetia in the Caucasus in pursuit of Avery Walker and Apollyon — the same criminals pursued by Pride and NCIS New Orleans. Isler is taken hostage by a local military warlord, and Pride and LaSalle team up with a local military operator to ransom Isler and escape to nearby friendly territory in the Republic of Georgia. Pride stays behind to give cover for LaSalle and an injured Isler to get away via motorboat. Isler participates then in a scheme to root out a mole in U.S. intelligence by faking his death, claimed to be due to wounds (rather than injuries) incurred in his rescue. He is put into a deep sleep and carried off the aircraft in New Orleans in a flag-draped coffin, only to be re-awakened in secret by coroner Loretta Wade injecting him with adrenaline. Meanwhile Pride ends up in the hands of Apollyon and its leader Avery Walker, who had earlier escaped from prison in New Orleans.

=== Douglas Hamilton ===
Douglas Hamilton (Steven Weber) first appeared as the New Orleans city councilman of District C. Though he shares a mutual dislike with Dwayne Pride, the two often reconcile their differences in the pursuit of safeguarding New Orleans. In season two, Hamilton ran for the office of the Mayor of New Orleans and was elected after the other candidate was arrested for funneling drugs into Hamilton's district. He and Pride are later taken hostage after Hamilton is implicated in a cold homicide case, though he is later exonerated, and the real killer is arrested. In season three, a computer hacker leaks Hamilton's sex-tape and emails to the media, jeopardizing his future as a public servant. He was arrested by Pride and removed from office at the end of season three because of the Clearwater case (a plot to flood part of New Orleans so Hamilton's company could build a new shipyard in the neighborhood).

=== Zahra Taylor ===
Zahra Taylor (Amanda Warren) is the mayor of New Orleans from Season 4 onward. Previously the interim mayor after Mayor Hamilton's arrest, she was elected on a special election against conservative Vernon Butler. Her campaign was assisted by Wade and presumably the entire NCIS team. She was targeted for death during the election, and later in the season finale

=== Jim Messier ===
Jim Messier (Dylan Walsh) is a captain with the New Orleans Police Department. In "My City", it is revealed that he was seduced by Sasha Broussard into becoming a mole, which led to his assassinating Baitfish, once he was captured by Special Agent Pride and his team. Pride and LaSalle eventually discover a badly beaten Messier at an abandoned motel area with Pride and LaSalle managing to get Messier to safety before the bomb goes off. After being placed into custody, Messier is presumably convicted of his crimes, stripped of his rank as Captain and jailed.

=== Carl Estes ===
Carl Estes (Matt Servitto) is a captain with the New Orleans Police Department. On the job for years, Estes nevertheless becomes increasingly impressed with Dwayne Pride and his NCIS team, as he has opportunity to see them "do more with less", and actually get good results while staying within the legal procedures required. Eventually he is brought into the NCIS team's inner circle and participates with them on some cases in his capacity as a NOPD captain. His honesty and incorruptibility, combined with his closeness to Pride, makes him the target of a car bombing in the Season 4 episode "Checkmate, Part 1".

=== Karen Izzo ===
Karen Izzo (Sharon Conley) is an Assistant United States Attorney assigned to investigate Pride's team during NCIS: New Orleans's third season. She shows up in a number of episodes, mostly as an antagonist in the local legal structure, blocking the NCIS team from doing what they consider to be their jobs, and often appearing to be an apparatchik of either Mayor Hamilton or some other political entity. But she does seem to have some slight sympathy for Pride and perhaps his methods, as she also warns Pride from time to time that he should watch his back.

=== Eric Barlow ===
AAG Eric Barlow (Doug Savant) is a U.S. Associate Attorney General (AAG), and is a dangerous and wily adversary. He is eventually revealed to be the main Washington D.C. official who has been gunning for Pride and his team for a long time, and who was the real puppet-master behind Mayor Hamilton and his business aspirations. Barlow appears in person in New Orleans in Season 4 as an arrogant, entitled man who has ruthlessly cheated his way to the top of his ladder ever since he was in high school, and continues to have grand business designs for New Orleans. He also has in his sights the governorship of Louisiana, and it is intimated his ambitions go higher still. Meanwhile, in his high and respectable place in the U.S. Department of Justice, he is in a position to deflect suspicion from himself and to implicate whomever he wants in all sorts of problems. His main target is Dwayne Pride, whose knack for sniffing out and fighting corruption is too much of a threat to men like Barlow. Pride's own history of skirting the edge of authority and rules will be exploited by Barlow. Nonetheless, Barlow is impressed with Pride's ability to assemble a magnificent team, and he tries unsuccessfully to poach Agent Tammy Gregorio, among others. The NCIS team is officially supposed to have been in a "stand down" position during this time when Pride is under DOJ investigation, but they still secretly assist another clandestine team that Pride has assembled "off-book". This team of Pride's friends are mostly tech people and Dr. Loretta Wade, and they infiltrate Barlow's New Orleans office building and his stand-alone computer system. Elvis Bertrand and former Green Beret Sgt. Sydney Halliday steal Barlow's files on a jump drive, while Pride and his lawyer distract Barlow in his office. Pride's team just barely get away, but are spotted and then legally pursued by Barlow's henchmen, including his ultra-dangerous tech chief Amelia Parsons, whose computer station had been breached while she was drawn away from it by Dr. Wade. Barlow's criminal scheme involves the murder of New Orleans Mayor Zahra Taylor, which would allow Barlow's puppet candidate to be recommended, and make Barlow positioned to launch a run for governor. In the process, Dwayne Pride is elaborately framed by Barlow's operatives, beginning with a bad publicity campaign on social media and in the conventional press, conducted by blogger Oliver Crane, who later switches sides and becomes part of Pride's secret team. Barlow's frame job leads up to Pride's friend NOPD Captain Carl Estes being killed by a car bomb, and Pride himself being set up as the murderer of the Mayoral candidate Zahra Taylor. Barlow's tech people faked photos of Pride driving the truck with explosives in it, and a crooked NOPD leader — Deputy Chief Cedric Gossett (Lou Diamond Phillips) — pretending to avenge Captain Estes murder, turns out to be Barlow's own puppet candidate for mayor, and he kidnaps Pride onto the Police boat from which a rocket attack will be launched against Mayor Taylor's car. Gossett radios that Pride has taken over the boat and is in process of the attack, but Pride fights back, and Gossett is ultimately gunned down by the Coast Guard, who came to Pride's defense after the NCIS team prove the photos of Pride were digitally doctored. Barlow's plans foiled, he goes to his legal office to plan his next move (maybe even to plan his escape), when confronted by Sydney Halliday, who informs him that his entire sordid past is being released to the press and to social media as they speak. He threatens her, then tries to bargain with her, then to bribe her, but she tells him he is all out of moves. She directs him to a pistol with one round in it, and suggests that it is his only option left other than full prosecution for his crimes and total public humiliation. As she walks away, a shot can be heard in the background, suggesting that Barlow took Halliday's suggestion.

=== John Stone ===
John Stone (Maury Sterling) is Mayor Hamilton's new security chief, appearing in Season 3 episodes "Knockout," "Down the Rabbit Hole," and "Poetic Justice". Stone is a mercenary and a murderer, whose security team is no less than a hit squad, and who has a personal stake in Hamilton's investments and schemes. He ends up almost making Hamilton a puppet partner, but goes too far when he tries to kill Pride by blowing up the Tru Tone bar. Pride takes advantage of the temporary belief that he's dead, and disappears. He beats up Stone and hauls him around in the trunk of a car, trying to get information out of him. On a rooftop, Pride unties Stone, and is determined to let the man battle it out with him. Stone pulls a knife on Pride and in self-defense Pride ends up throwing Stone off the roof to his death. Later, the connection is made that Stone was really working for AAG Eric Barlow. Stone's widow Amelia later shows up to avenge him.

=== Amelia Parsons Stone ===
Amelia Parsons (Ellen Hollman) is AAG Eric Barlow's tech security chief, but she is also a lethal ex-CIA assassin. It is discovered that she was, in reality, the wife and widow of former mayor Hamilton's security chief John Stone, and besides Barlow's anti-NCIS plans, she has her own revenge to serve to Pride, who killed her husband in self-defense. Ameila is tough as nails, ruthless, adept at evading capture, and possesses both martial arts, weapons, and tech skills to infiltrate, harass and pursue targets. She nearly murders Pride in his apartment and in the hospital in the Season 4 finale and the Season 5 premiere, but is finally caught by LaSalle, and is handed over to the Feds for prosecution since she was ex-CIA. However, it is later discovered that she used her knowledge of legally-troubling CIA ops to bargain with the Feds for her release. She had joined the Apollyon spy organization at some point, so had dirty secrets on both the CIA and Apollyon, and in the Season 5 episode "Tick Tock", Amelia is again being held prisoner in a safe house by what appear to be CIA operatives. Amelia's sister, her husband and their daughter have been kidnapped by Apollyon, along with Loretta Wade and Pride's father Cassius. Apollyon (later revealed to be voiced by a rogue NSA intel analyst Philip Sinclair, head of Apollyon) kidnaps Dwayne Pride and leverages him to view a classified CIA file currently being held in a safe in his office — one he never knew about before. In that file is the address of the safe house that is holding Amelia. Pride is compelled to go to the house and liberate Amelia by force, so she can find a hidden briefcase and bring it to Apollyon, so they can mine secrets from that file. Meanwhile, Cassius manages to free himself and Loretta from their zip-tie handcuffs, and are waiting for a chance to spring from the building that holds them. Finding himself and assassin Amelia held captive in the same vulnerable position, Pride tries to help her save her family and gain release from their captors. But in the end, Amelia resorts to her mission of vengeance against Pride, and taking several shots at him, Pride's father Cassius steps in front of the bullets and is killed instead. Pride then shoots and kills Amelia.

=== Sasha Broussard ===
Sasha Broussard (Callie Thorne) is a former member of the New Orleans Broussard crime syndicate, though she claims she is trying to disassociate herself from her family. After she gains the trust of Pride, the team discover she has been assisting Baitfish in his quest to control the entirety of NOLA's criminal enterprises. She is arrested and presumably convicted of her crimes. In "Once Upon A Time" (season 7, episode 12), it's revealed that Sasha and Pride have a son, Connor Davenport.

=== Connor Davenport ===
Connor Davenport (Drew Scheid) is the son of Sasha Broussard and Dwayne Pride. In "Once Upon A Time" (season 7, episode 12), he throws a Molotov cocktail through the front window of Pride's bar, The Tru TONE. He was born on 11/21/2004 according to his Metairie High School ID.

=== Paul Jenks ===
Paul Jenks (John Livingston) is a former member of the Broussard Syndicate and Confidential Informant for Dwayne Pride, known as Baitfish. During season one, he teams up with Sasha Broussard to take over the criminal underground of New Orleans left by the downfall of the Syndicate, and is responsible for multiple murders. He is later arrested by Pride's team, but not before assassinating Savannah Kelly. In "How Much Pain Can You Take?", Jenks warns the team of impending trouble and is shot and killed by an unknown sniper, later revealed to be Capt. Jim Messier in the New Orleans Police Department.

=== Avery Walker ===
Avery Walker (Tim Griffin) is the leader of Apollyon, a deadly underground spy network featured in Season 5, supposedly a "private intelligence firm," made up of "former intelligence and special forces" personnel. The leader of Apollyon prior to Walker was an NSA intel analyst named Sinclair. Walker was a mercenary and independent security contractor in the Middle East, who then started working for a Russian oligarch, and ended up being a top operative in the intelligence crime syndicate Apollyon, eventually running that too — with ties to foreign terrorist organizations. Apollyon is responsible for bringing an IRA bomb maker to New Orleans in the episode "Inside Out", at the end of which is cornered by Pride and arrested. In the episode "Tick Tock", the head of Apollyon — shown later to be Sinclair — orchestrates a hostage situation designed to get Pride and his attempted assassin Amelia Parsons Stone, into his clutches to retrieve important intel, resulting in the death of Pride's father Cassius and assassin Amelia. The succeeding episode "Vindicta" reveals that NSA analyst Philip Sinclair (Matthew Rauch) is the head of Apollyon, but made it look like Walker ran the hostage op from prison. Subsequently, Walker — or Sinclair — arranged a ruse enabling Walker's escape from prison and disappearance. Sinclair commits suicide when he knows Pride is on to him, and Walker ends up succeeding him at Apollyon. Walker is later found hiding out in South Ossetia, a disputed and lawless territory between Russia and Georgia in the Caucasus Mountains. In "The River Styx" Parts 1 & 2, FBI Agent Raymond Isler is captured in South Ossetia while pursuing Walker, and Pride and LaSalle and a local mercenary operative work to ransom Isler and escape to Georgia, but Pride is caught and interrogated by Walker, who flies Pride home in a cargo plane back to his secret headquarters in Brownsville, Texas, interrogating Pride along the way, using truth-serum-type hallucinogenic drugs. Walker is searching Pride's memory for an address seen in an old photo of a house, kept secret in a file. Pride finally breaks and gives up the address, which turns out to be where Walker's young son was staying; Pride fights his way out of his captivity at the same time the NCIS team arrives to rescue him, but Walker gets away. Pride remembers the address he gave up under duress, and the whole team flies to the location, beating Walker, who drove there. Walker suicidally attempts to draw on Pride, and is killed by Agent Gregorio's sniper shot. As he is dying, Pride promises him no one will ever discover his son's identity or hurt him.

== Crossover characters ==
=== Abigail Borin ===
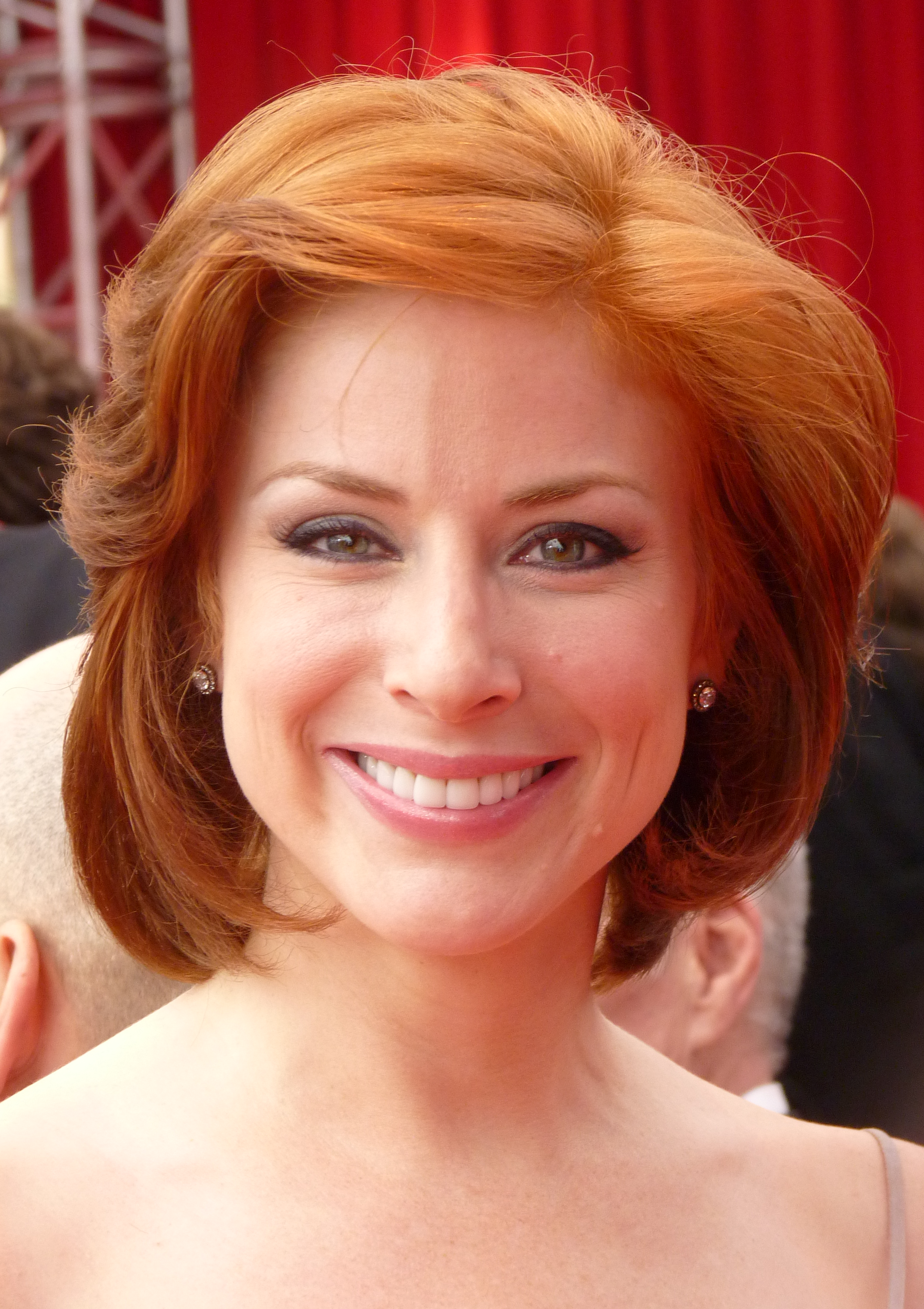
Diane Neal reprises the role of Abby Borin, who originated on NCIS.

Abigail Borin (Diane Neal) is a Coast Guard Investigative Service Special Agent in Charge based out of the capital. Borin first works with Pride's team when she is tasked with interrogating a smuggler whose crimes took place within Coast Guard jurisdiction. She later investigates a double homicide on-board a research vessel, during which she notes she has been temporarily assigned Agent Afloat status. Borin reunites with Pride to investigate the poisoning of a Naval Commander, and in "Rock-a-Bye Baby", the kidnapping of a young child. Borin expresses a desire to join Pride's team, though she had similarly inquired about the possibility of working with Leroy Jethro Gibbs, Pride's friend who is stationed in Washington D.C.

=== Leon Vance ===
Leon Vance (Rocky Carroll) is the director of the Naval Criminal Investigative Service, based out of Washington. Though he has little physical interaction with the New Orleans team, he often communicates with them via secure satellite conference. He regards Pride and his agents as one of NCIS' most valuable assets (though he has previously praised both Gibbs' NCIS team, and Callen's Los Angeles team in the same manner). In season two, Vance orders a specialist unit to shadow Pride, who is in fear for his life.

=== Others ===
Leroy Jethro Gibbs (Mark Harmon)

"Breaking Brig", "Sister City: Part II", "Pandora's Box: Part II", "See You Soon"

Gibbs is a Supervisory Special Agent assigned to NCIS's Major Case Response Team. He is a crossover character from NCIS.

Anthony DiNozzo (Michael Weatherly)

"Carrier"

DiNozzo is a Senior Special Agent who was assigned to NCIS's Major Case Response Team. He is a crossover character from NCIS.

Timothy McGee (Sean Murray)

"Pandora's Box: Part II"

McGee is a Senior Special Agent assigned to NCIS's Major Case Response Team. He is a crossover character from NCIS.

Eleanor Bishop (Emily Wickersham)

"Sister City: Part II"

Bishop is a Special Agent assigned to NCIS's Major Case Response Team. She is a crossover character from NCIS.

Nicholas Torres (Wilmer Valderrama)

"Pandora's Box: Part II"

Torres is a Special Agent assigned to NCIS's Major Case Response Team. He is a crossover character from NCIS.

Abby Sciuto (Pauley Perrette)

"Carrier", "Sister City: Part II"

Abby is a forensic specialist assigned to NCIS Headquarters. She is a crossover character from NCIS.

Donald "Ducky" Mallard (David McCallum)

"Musician, Heal Thyself", "Sister City: Part II"

Ducky is a medical examiner assigned to NCIS Headquarters. He is a crossover character from NCIS.

Sarah Porter (Leslie Hope)

"Touched by the Sun"

Porter is the United States Secretary of the Navy. She is a crossover character from NCIS.

Carol Wilson (Meredith Eaton)

"Carrier"

Carol works for the CDC. She is a crossover character from NCIS.

Tobias C. Fornell (Joe Spano)

"It Happened Last Night"

Fornell is a Senior FBI Special Agent. He is a crossover character from NCIS.
