= Valerie Page =

Valerie Page may refer to:

- Valerie Page, a fictional character in V for Vendetta
- Valerie Page, a fictional character in NCIS
