= NCIS season 11 =

Season of television series

NCIS
- Season 11
- Season 11 U.S. DVD cover
- Starring: Mark Harmon; Michael Weatherly; Cote de Pablo; Pauley Perrette; Sean Murray; Brian Dietzen; Emily Wickersham; Rocky Carroll; David McCallum
- No. of episodes: 24

Release
- Original network: CBS
- Original release: September 24, 2013 – May 13, 2014

Season chronology
- ← Previous; Season 10 Next → NCIS Season 12; NCIS: NO Season 1

The eleventh season of the police procedural drama NCIS premiered on September 24, 2013, in the same time slot as the previous seasons, Tuesdays at 8 pm.

Special Agent Ziva David (Cote de Pablo), departs during the season with her final appearance being in "Past, Present and Future". Also introduced NSA Analyst Eleanor "Ellie" Bishop to become NCIS Probationary Special Agent, loaned to NCIS on Joint Duty Assignment. The episode "Crescent City (Part I)", which aired on March 25, 2014, serves as the first of a two-part backdoor pilot of a second spin off from NCIS called NCIS: New Orleans based in New Orleans.

== Cast and characters ==
=== Main ===
- Mark Harmon as Leroy Jethro Gibbs, NCIS Supervisory Special Agent (SSA) of the Major Case Response Team (MCRT) assigned to Washington's Navy Yard
- Michael Weatherly as Anthony DiNozzo, NCIS Senior Special Agent, Second in Command of MCRT
- Cote de Pablo as Ziva David, NCIS Special Agent (episodes 1–2)
- Pauley Perrette as Abby Sciuto, Forensic Specialist for NCIS
- Sean Murray as Timothy McGee, NCIS Special Agent
- Brian Dietzen as Jimmy Palmer, Assistant Medical Examiner for NCIS
- Emily Wickersham as Eleanor "Ellie" Bishop, NCIS Probationary Special Agent and former NSA Analyst, loaned to NCIS on Joint Duty Assignment (recurring episodes 9–11, main cast starting episode 12)
- Rocky Carroll as Leon Vance, NCIS Director
- David McCallum as Dr. Donald "Ducky" Mallard, Chief Medical Examiner for NCIS

=== Recurring ===
- Alan Dale as Thomas Morrow, Homeland Security Section Chief and former NCIS Director
- Joe Spano as Tobias Fornell, FBI Senior Special Agent
- Colin Hanks as Richard Parsons, DoD Inspector
- Marina Sirtis as Orli Elbaz, Mossad Director
- Damon Dayoub as Adam Eshel, Ziva's contact
- Gabi Coccio as young Ziva David
- Hugo Armstrong as Eugene Coyle, from the NCIS Inspector General's office
- Salli Richardson-Whitfield as Carrie Clark, former FBI Special Agent, turned criminal attorney
- Meredith Eaton as Carol Wilson, immunologist and friend of Abby
- Susanna Thompson as Hollis Mann, DoD Special Agent, Gibbs' former girlfriend and former Army CID agent
- Wendy Makkena as Dr. Rachel Cranston, a psychiatrist and Caitlin Todd's sister
- Ralph Waite as Jackson Gibbs, Gibbs' father
- Robert Wagner as Anthony DiNozzo, Sr., Tony's father
- Michelle Pierce as Breena Palmer, Jimmy Palmer's wife
- Jackie Geary as Susan Grady, NCIS Polygraph Specialist
- Diane Neal as Abigail Borin, CGIS Special Agent in Charge
- Marco Sanchez as Alejandro Rivera, incarcerated former official in the Mexican Justice Department and enemy of Gibbs
- Akinsola Aribo as Jared Vance, Leon Vance's son
- Kiara Muhammad as Kayla Vance, Leon Vance's daughter
- Melinda McGraw as Diane Sterling, Gibbs' and Fornell's ex-wife
- Leslie Hope as Sarah Porter, new Secretary of the Navy
- Margo Harshman as Delilah Fielding, DoD Computer Specialist and McGee's girlfriend
- Juliette Angelo as Emily Fornell, Tobias Fornell's daughter
- Kelli Williams as Maureen Cabot, NCIS Special Agent

=== Guests ===
- Roma Maffia as retiring NCIS Special Agent Vera Strickland
- Muse Watson as Mike Franks, deceased retired Senior Special Agent for NCIS and Gibbs' former boss
- Sterling K. Brown as Elijah Banner
- Ben Vereen as Lamar Addison
- Holley Fain as Audrey Daly
- Alyvia Alyn Lind as Emma Daly
- Alanna Ubach as NSA Senior Intelligence Analyst Sofia Martinez
- Ravi Kapoor as Bashir Malik
- Jeff Galfer as CIA Case Officer Victor Hodge
- Nestor Serrano as NSA Supervisor Jeremy Marlens
- John Allen Nelson as JSOC Vice Admiral Lloyd Manditsky
- Shishir Kurup as Khalil Farooq
- Aaron Hill as Navy SEAL Lieutenant William Blake
- Keith Carradine as Mannheim Gold
- Joel Brooks as Ronnie Mustard
- Hank Harris as Denny Johnson
- Scott Bakula as Dwayne Cassius Pride, NCIS Senior Special Agent in New Orleans
- Lucas Black as Christopher LaSalle, NCIS Special Agent in New Orleans, second in command
- Zoe McLellan as Meredith Brody, NCIS Special Agent in Chicago
- CCH Pounder as Loretta Wade, Jefferson Parish Medical Examiner for NCIS in New Orleans
- Chelcie Ross as Joseph Hanlon
- Aaron Clifton Moten as Wendell Hobbs
- Stuart Margolin as Felix Betts
- Kelli Williams as NCIS Special Agent Maureen Cabot
- Titus Makin Jr. as Navy Ensign Thomas Burke
- Justin Prentice as Navy Ensign Michael Fox
- Chastity Dotson as former Navy Lt. Monica King
- Anthony Tyler Quinn as Navy Commander Clarence Daniels
- Burt Grinstead as Navy Lieutenant Junior Grade William Greco
- Joseph Whipp as Old Man
- Marco Sanchez as Alejandro Rivera
- Fernanda Andrade as Leticia Gomez
- Billy Dee Williams as Leroy Jethro Moore
- Clare Carey as Ann Gibbs, Gibbs' mother
- Kim Rhodes as CIA Officer Sandra Jenkins

== Episodes ==
No. overall	No. in season	Title	Directed by	Written by	Original release date	Prod. code	U.S. viewers (millions)
235	1	"Whiskey Tango Foxtrot"	Tony Wharmby	Gary Glasberg	September 24, 2013	1101	20.02
Part 5 of 6: Some time before the cliffhanger scene in "Damned If You Do" ...A hotel bomb explodes killing SECNAV Clayton Jarvis and injuring Homeland Security Section Chief Tom Morrow. The NCIS team discovers it to be part of a plot to take them down one by one. Gibbs heads to Tehran to meet with an informant, while Tony books a flight to Tel Aviv to be with Ziva. Tony gets ready to leave, but is attacked by a sniper. McGee tries to solve the mystery of the bomb's origins.
236	2	"Past, Present, and Future"	James Whitmore Jr.	Teleplay by : Scott Williams & Gina Lucita Monreal; Story by : Gary Glasberg	October 1, 2013	1102	19.98
Part 6 of 6: Gibbs and the team continue the hunt for Benham Parsa and his growing terrorist ring while Tony heads to Israel to track down Ziva. After being attacked in an alley, Gibbs interrogates a member of the Brotherhood of Doubt, Parsa's terrorist cell responsible for the bombing (in "Whiskey Tango Foxtrot"). Gibbs learns the location for the next attack, and must take up a sniper rifle to take out the bomber before he can activate the bomb with his cell phone (as depicted in the closing scene of Season 10). Note: This is last episode with Cote de Pablo playing Ziva David as a main cast member, until her reappearance in the Season 16 finale, "Daughters" as a guest star.
237	3	"Under the Radar"	Dennis Smith	George Schenck & Frank Cardea	October 8, 2013	1103	18.33
The team must seek assistance from Twitter in help to find a missing Navy lieutenant. Gibbs’ old friend temporarily joins the team for the case. Meanwhile, McGee somehow loses his badge.
238	4	"Anonymous Was a Woman"	Terrence O'Hara	Steven D. Binder	October 15, 2013	1104	18.83
Upon discovering a connection to an Afghan women's shelter that deceased Agent Mike Franks has supported for years, Gibbs and McGee travel to Afghanistan to investigate.
239	5	"Once a Crook"	Arvin Brown	Christopher Silber	October 22, 2013	1105	19.00
DiNozzo returns to his Baltimore Police Department days when he sees a felony suspect from a 15-year-old case at the NCIS crime scene of a murdered petty officer.
240	6	"Oil & Water"	Thomas J. Wright	Jennifer Corbett	October 29, 2013	1106	19.30
A suspicious explosion on board an oil rig has NCIS partnering up with the Coast Guard Investigative Service (CGIS), most notably CGIS Agent Abigail "Abby" Borin. Meanwhile, a mysterious prankster is targeting the NCIS team and no-one is safe from them.
241	7	"Better Angels"	Tony Wharmby	Gina Lucita Monreal	November 5, 2013	1107	19.18
The team investigates the death of a Marine sergeant who was apparently killed trying to stop a robbery attempt in a clothing shop. Police call Gibbs after his father has an automobile accident. His father wants Gibbs to accompany him to meet a dying man who saved his life during World War II. Note: Executive producer Gary Glasberg said it was an emotional story "based on some real historical storytelling," referring to real-life Charlie Brown and Franz Stigler incident during WWII.
242	8	"Alibi"	Holly Dale	George Schenck & Frank Cardea	November 12, 2013	1108	19.37
The team goes out to investigate a fatal hit and run near Quantico. The prime suspect has an alibi, which he will not disclose to NCIS: he was murdering someone else at the time.
243	9	"Gut Check"	Dennis Smith	Christopher J. Waild	November 19, 2013	1109	19.66
A bug is discovered in a pen held by the new SECNAV, Sarah Porter, during a confidential meeting, and the team works with NSA Analyst Eleanor "Ellie" Bishop to find the person responsible.
244	10	"Devil's Triad"	Arvin Brown	Steven D. Binder	December 10, 2013	1110	19.30
The team investigate the death of a Marine and discover a link between the current boyfriend of Diane Sterling, Gibbs and Tobias Fornell's ex-wife. NSA agent Ellie Bishop struggles to adjust to being a member of the NCIS team.
245	11	"Homesick"	Terrence O'Hara	Scott Williams	December 17, 2013	1111	19.65
The holiday mood is ruined when the team is called up by the Naval Medical Research Center and the CDC to investigate a potential bioterrorist threat after eight children from Navy and Marine families are hospitalized in the ICU with similar symptoms. After the count climbs to thirty-four children, the team finds out the outbreak is not a deliberate attack; a returning serviceman accidentally acted as a carrier for a rare African bacteria, which can be treated once diagnosed. Meanwhile, Vance receives a visit from his deceased wife Jackie's father, Lamar Addison, who he bears a grudge for abandoning Jackie when she was young.
246	12	"Kill Chain"	James Whitmore Jr.	Christopher Silber	January 7, 2014	1112	20.84
Part 1 of 3: After a stolen Navy "Angelus" unmanned drone guns down Navy PO1 Daniel Coyne, the drone is revealed to be linked to the elusive terrorist, Benham Parsa. The team joins forces with the Department of Defense, bringing the team back into contact with Gibbs' ex-girlfriend, retired Lt. Colonel Hollis Mann. Both teams must track down and recover the aircraft before it can be used for a large-scale attack. Meanwhile, McGee struggles with asking for time off, as his girlfriend Delilah Fielding wants him to attend a black-tie gala honoring her with the Conrad Fellowship award. After a few false leads, and upon interrogating Erin Pace, the team learns too late that the Conrad Gala, a "who's who" from the counter-terrorism community, is Parsa's next target. Several attendees are killed, and Delilah is severely injured. Gibbs and Mann vow to continue the hunt for Parsa....
247	13	"Double Back"	Tony Wharmby	Gina Lucita Monreal	January 14, 2014	1113	19.72
Part 2 of 3: Gibbs and the team track down Parsa's driver, Bashir Malik, using DNA evidence from a bullet Gibbs hit him with back at the warehouse where Parsa escaped (in "Kill Chain"). McGee struggles with survivor guilt while Delilah goes back into surgery to remove shrapnel from the drone strike at the Conrad Gala. Bishop introduces Tony to NSA Senior Intelligence Analyst Sofia Martinez, whose mannerisms are eerily similar to Tony's. While the team fails to catch Parsa, they discover clues as to where he might have gone....
248	14	"Monsters and Men"	Dennis Smith	Jennifer Corbett	February 4, 2014	1114	19.53
Part 3 of 3: The murder of a port authority officer reveals Parsa's possible whereabouts, as the team continues their tireless hunt. NSA Supervisor Jeremy Marlens expresses concerns to Gibbs about Bishop's obsessive hunt for Parsa. Eventually, she reveals she has been the Parsa "expert" since the beginning, six years prior, which raises trust issues with Gibbs. After capturing and interrogating Parsa's bodyguard, Khalil Farooq, the team zeros in on Parsa's exact location in Pakistan using Bishop's analysis. JSOC Vice Admiral Lloyd Manditsky authorizes Navy SEAL Lieutenant William Blake to lead a strike team. Parsa is wounded, captured, and taken to brig of the USS Willmington aircraft carrier where he claims he will reveal his entire terror network, but only to NSA Agent Bishop; however, it is a ruse to isolate and kill Bishop before Parsa commits suicide. Gibbs uses audio of Parsa's sister Hayat to distract and kill Parsa, rescuing Bishop in the process. Gibbs admonishes Bishop with Rule #11, "When the job is done, walk away," then welcomes Bishop aboard as a full-time, albeit "probie" NCIS Agent.
249	15	"Bulletproof"	Leslie Libman	Christopher J. Waild	February 25, 2014	1115	17.03
The team examine a crash and soon discover bulletproof vests associated with the United States Marine Corps but the investigation takes a turn after Abby's tests determine that the supposedly safe vests are actually faulty.
250	16	"Dressed to Kill"	Thomas J. Wright	George Schenck & Frank Cardea	March 4, 2014	1116	17.85
After meeting his father, DiNozzo confronts a man dressed as a Navy commander. The man runs and is followed by DiNozzo who ultimately shoots and kills him. The only witness is DiNozzo's father.
251	17	"Rock and a Hard Place"	Arvin Brown	Steven D. Binder	March 18, 2014	1117	17.11
Guitar amplifier speakers explode when Navy PO1 Damien Hunter tests out a Fender vintage 1962 Telecaster that once belonged to Merle Haggard, killing Damien and a custodian in the dressing room prior to a Hero Comfort Foundation military charity concert at the Naval Air Station Patuxent River. Initial suspicions indicate aging rock star Mannheim Gold, who hasn't performed since the 1980s, was the intended target. As the team search Mannheim's past for suspects, Tony catches Denny Johnson who has been stalking Mannheim, only to discover Denny is Mannheim's son. When they discount him as the bomber, Mannheim's first agent Ronnie Mustard (who everyone thought dead) admits he sabotaged Mannheim's brakes, causing a car crash, to cover for embezzling royalties. But he flatly denies planting the bomb. The team soon discovers another target, and motive, after finding a partial thumbprint on shrapnel from the bomb, a World War II-era Mark 24 warhead. They now suspect HCF concert coordinator Luke Pischedda intended the bomb to be a diversion to recover ten million dollars he stole from military cash shipments overseas. Meanwhile, Jimmy Palmer prepares to become a father.
252	18	"Crescent City"	James Whitmore Jr.	Gary Glasberg	March 25, 2014	1118	17.52
253	19	"Crescent City"	Tony Wharmby	Gary Glasberg	April 1, 2014	1119	17.16
Part I: When Congressman Dan McLane is found murdered in New Orleans, Gibbs and his team join forces with Fornell's FBI team and the local NOLA field office. Gibbs reunites with long-time compatriot and friend Dwayne Cassius "King" Pride, currently the NCIS Senior Special Agent in New Orleans. Gibbs and Bishop head to New Orleans while DiNozzo and McGee stay in D.C. to work the case with Fornell. Things soon become personal as the Congressman was a former NIS agent and their contemporary and his murder could possibly dredge up one of their old cases involving the so-called "Privileged" serial killer. Abby turns up evidence that leads Gibbs and Pride, along with NCIS New Orleans Special Agent Christopher LaSalle and Meredith Brody, a Chicago NCIS Special Agent transferred from Naval Station Great Lakes, to a square where, the unrevealed killer begins taking surveillance photographs of the NCIS team from a hotel room. Part II: Another victim is found in the wetlands, dead at least two weeks. His throat had been cut with a steel blade and jet fuel is found in tire tracks near his body. Abby calls Gibbs to say the jet fuel matched the fuel found on the car mats belonging to victim Agent Doyle. A suspect, believed to have been obsessed with Congressman McLane and the Privileged Killer case, is also found dead. Gibbs and Pride track the killer, the son of a McClane contributor, Spencer Hanlon to a military bar and a nearby cemetery, after Gibbs recalls marble dust also being found in Doyle's car. Gibbs and Pride kill Hanlon who is about to murder Petty Officer Carla Meade. After solving the case, Pride and his team receive another one. Pride invites Meredith Brody to stay as a permanent member of the New Orleans NCIS team.
254	20	"Page Not Found"	Terrence O'Hara	Christopher J. Waild	April 8, 2014	1120	17.39
When Delilah finds an encrypted email relating to the murder of a Navy lieutenant in Budapest, she is ordered to ignore it but instead she goes to Gibbs and NCIS opens an investigation. The team realizes that there may be more to the case when they run into a CIA operative tailing them. Meanwhile, McGee wants to take his relationship with Delilah further and asks her to move in with him.
255	21	"Alleged"	Arvin Brown	Scott Williams	April 15, 2014	1121	17.12
The rape of Naval Ensign Holly Farrell is brought to light when one of her shipmates is killed after a fight in a bar. The team, with help from NCIS Special Agent Maureen Cabot, tracks down the rapist, who is also responsible for several other rapes of Navy women over the span of his career.
256	22	"Shooter"	Dennis Smith	George Schenck & Frank Cardea	April 29, 2014	1122	17.25
An embedded Marine photographer nicknamed "Shooter" who disappeared prior to testifying at a court martial is found dead of an apparent drug overdose; it turns into a murder investigation. The team is confronted with the deplorable situation of homeless veterans in the DC area, whom the photographer was documenting. The case takes a turn from simple homicide into organ harvesting from the homeless. Meanwhile, Abby decides to help a homeless woman reconnect with her family.
257	23	"The Admiral's Daughter"	James Whitmore Jr.	Christopher Silber & Steven D. Binder	May 6, 2014	1123	15.88
Tony is assigned to escort Amanda, the daughter of the Vice Chairman of the Joint Chiefs of Staff from Marseille due to her extravagant party lifestyle, to only find all the NCIS Marseille agents and office staff have been murdered. Tony and Amanda then find themselves on the run from a rogue French policewoman. The team back home work on a supposedly separate case involving a corpse found in a septic tank at Norfolk with a link to Amanda's father. Things become complicated when Tony discovers that Amanda's party-girl persona was a mere cover for her work with the Defense Clandestine Service.
258	24	"Honor Thy Father"	Tony Wharmby	Gary Glasberg & Gina Lucita Monreal	May 13, 2014	1124	16.95
After the team apprehends Wayne "The Snail" Levinson for robbing The Green Star bar, a fire breaks out on the USS Niagra, a classified detention site for indicted terrorists. Gibbs returns home to Pennsylvania upon the death of his father, Jackson, due to a stroke. The remaining team learns the ship fire was purposely set to free Brotherhood of Doubt members who were captured as a result of interrogating Benham Parsa (in "Monsters and Men"). The "chameleon" terrorist Lateef Mir makes it to shore in a RIB and then turns up at The Green Star where, it is revealed, The Snail was actually planting three handguns for pick-up. Under interrogation, Levinson admits he was hired by Leticia Gomez, who says the job was on behalf of the incarcerated Alejandro Rivera (after events in "Spider and the Fly"). Alejandro, the son of the drug lord Gibbs killed in retaliation for killing his first wife Shannon and daughter Kelly, used Reynosa cartel money to fund the breakout of Parsa's followers, with orders to kill their common enemy. Gibbs must then defend himself against Alejandro's hired killers. The episode is dedicated to Ralph Waite.

== Production ==
On February 1, 2013, CBS renewed NCIS for this season. The same date Mark Harmon extended his contract on the show with a new "multiyear deal" with CBS. It was announced on July 10, 2013, that Cote de Pablo, who plays Ziva David, had chosen not to return for the eleventh season as a regular. She will appear in enough episodes to close out her character's storylines. Because of de Pablo's exit, showrunner Gary Glasberg had to change his planned storyline for season 11. "Someone asked me if I was planning for this, but I really wasn't, so basically the minute that this became real, I had to throw out a lot of what I was planning to do and start from scratch". Glasberg has stated that there will be rotating characters coming to fill Ziva's role.

The theme for the season is "unlocking demons", both figurative and literal according to Glasberg. A "pretty interesting adversary" about the theme will be introduced, and "that will carry through the season".

=== Casting ===
Colin Hanks returned for the premiere episode as Defense Department investigator Richard Parsons, a character introduced at the end of the tenth season, while Marina Sirtis returned in the second episode as Mossad Director Orli Elbaz. Joe Spano also reprised his role as Senior FBI Agent Tobias C. Fornell in the first two episodes. Muse Watson (as Mike Franks) appeared in the fourth episode. Ralph Waite (as Gibbs' father Jackson Gibbs) and Robert Wagner (as Tony's father Anthony DiNozzo, Sr.) are also confirmed to return. Diane Neal reprises her role CGIS Special Agent Abigail Borin in episode six "Oil & Water". The second episode includes a character named Sarah Porter, played by Leslie Hope, who is the new Secretary of the Navy, while Margo Harshman has been cast in a potentially recurring role as Timothy McGee's girlfriend, Delilah Fielding. The third episode introduces retiring NCIS Special Agent Vera Strickland (Roma Maffia) who has known Gibbs for many years.

On August 13, 2013, "casting intel" on a new female character named Bishop was published, with filming scheduled to mid-October. Bishop is described as a "twentysomething female[;] bright, educated, athletic, attractive, fresh-faced, focused and somewhat socially awkward. She has a mysterious mixture of analytic brilliance, fierce determination and idealism. She's traveled extensively, but only feels comfortable at home." Emily Wickersham was cast to play the character, named NSA Analyst Ellie Bishop. Wickersham was promoted to the main cast, two weeks prior of her debut appearance. Her first appearance is in episode nine, "Gut Check".

Scott Bakula was considered for an undisclosed recurring role this season. He was later cast as Dwayne Pride in NCIS: New Orleans.

== Ratings ==
Episode	Ratings			
Episode	Original airdate	Viewers (millions)	Rank	
Episode	Original airdate	Viewers (millions)	Night	Week
"Whiskey Tango Foxtrot"	September 24, 2013	20.02	1	3
"Past, Present, and Future"	October 1, 2013	19.98	1	2
"Under the Radar"	October 8, 2013	18.33	1	2
"Anonymous Was a Woman"	October 15, 2013	18.83	1	2
"Once a Crook"	October 22, 2013	18.99	1	1
"Oil & Water"	October 29, 2013	19.30	1	1
"Better Angels"	November 5, 2013	19.18	1	2
"Alibi"	November 12, 2013	19.37	1	2
"Gut Check"	November 19, 2013	19.66	1	2
"Devil's Triad"	December 10, 2013	19.30	1	1
"Homesick"	December 17, 2013	19.65	1	1
"Kill Chain"	January 7, 2014	20.84	1	3
"Double Back"	January 14, 2014	19.72	1	3
"Monsters and Men"	February 4, 2014	19.53	1	5
"Bulletproof"	February 25, 2014	17.03	1	5
"Dressed to Kill"	March 4, 2014	17.85	1	2
"Rock and a Hard Place"	March 18, 2014	17.11	1	1
"Crescent City (Part I)"	March 25, 2014	17.52	1	1
"Crescent City (Part II)"	April 1, 2014	17.16	1	2
"Page Not Found"	April 8, 2014	17.39	1	2
"Alleged"	April 15, 2014	17.12	1	1
"Shooter"	April 29, 2014	17.25	1	1
"The Admiral's Daughter"	May 6, 2014	15.88	1	1
"Honor Thy Father"	May 13, 2014	16.95	1	1

== DVD special features ==
- Celebrating 250 - The NCIS cast and crew celebrate the airing of the NCIS Season 11/200th episode, "Dressed to Kill".
- NCIS in New Orleans - The NCIS cast and crew talk about filming the backdoor pilot episodes for NCIS: New Orleans, Crescent City Part 1 and Crescent City Part 2, on site in the city of New Orleans in Louisiana.
- Game Change - The NCIS cast and crew reflect on NCIS Season 11.
- Remembering Jackson Gibbs: A tribute to Ralph Waite - The NCIS cast and crew reflect on the late actor Ralph Waite who played Jackson Gibbs.
- On the Record - A behind-the-scenes feature showing Michael Weatherly recording his new song, "Under the Sun".
- Finding Ellie Bishop - The NCIS cast and crew discuss the newest addition to the team, Eleanor Bishop played by Emily Wickersham.
- In the Stills of the Night - A behind-the-scenes glimpse at the various "photographs" taken during numerous episodes of NCIS.
- Background Check - A behind-the-scenes feature on the extras seen in the background of the NCIS Squadroom.
- Joe Spano - Fornell For Real- The NCIS cast and crew talk about FBI Special Agent Tobias Fornell played by Joe Spano.
- Cast and Crew Commentaries on Selected Episodes (Region 1 and 2): Commentary on "Past, Present, and Future" with Michael Weatherly, James Whitmore Jr, Scott Williams and Gina Lucita Monreal, Commentary on "Crescent City" with Mark Harmon and Gary Glasberg, Commentary on "Shooter" with Pauley Perette, Sean Murray and Frank Cardea.
