= Gut Check (NCIS) =

- NCIS episode
- Episode no.: Season 11; Episode 9
- Directed by: Dennis Smith
- Written by: Christopher J. Wald
- Original air date: November 19, 2013

Guest appearances
- Emily Wickersham as NSA Agent Eleanor "Ellie" Bishop; Leslie Hope as Secretary of the Navy Sarah Porter; Alan Ruck as Ward Davis; Geoffrey Blake as Marc Attencio; Gideon Emery as Rudolph Stalin; Tim Peper as NSA Agent Chad Flynderling; Nichelle Hines as NCIS Special Agent Norma Hench

Episode chronology
| ← Previous "Alibi" | Next → "Devil's Triad" |
- NCIS season 11

"Gut Check" is the ninth episode of the eleventh season of the American police procedural drama NCIS, and the 243rd episode overall. It originally aired on CBS in the United States on November 19, 2013. The episode is written by Christopher J. Wald and directed by Dennis Smith, and was seen by 19.66 million viewers.

== Plot ==
During a briefing in the Multiple Threat Assessment Center (MTAC) by the Secretary of the Navy (SECNAV), network security detects an unauthorized electronic signal being broadcast, and the room is placed in lock down. While McGee sweeps the room, DiNozzo scans the four defense contractor representatives the SECNAV was briefing. Nothing is found until DiNozzo comes in close proximity to SECNAV, and his scanner goes off. A pen containing a covert listening device is found on SECNAV, but she cannot remember when or where the pen came from.

As the investigation proceeds, DiNozzo finds a two-year-old National Security Agency (NSA) threat analysis report that describes the exact scenario of the security breach. Gibbs and DiNozzo visit the National Security Operations Center where they meet analyst Eleanor "Ellie" Bishop, the paper's author. Gibbs brings Bishop back to NCIS to assist in the investigation.

SECNAV is contacted with a demand for $10 million for return of the intel that was recorded by the bug. She approves the payment and tasks the NSA with tracking the electronic funds transfer to catch the extortionist. Bishop's colleague at the NSA follows a lead to a coffee shop where the account was accessed from and is killed.

Abby's forensics work on the bug from the pen leads to a license plate number for the suspected extortionist. Gibbs, DiNozzo and Bishop apprehend him and interrogate him to find he was working with someone else who extorted the government and killed the NSA agent.

Gibbs' team tracks the killer to a private post office and are waiting to arrest him when Bishop arrives. Gibbs calls her to get her to get back in her car. As she tries to explain why she is there, the killer comes out of the post office surprising Bishop. The killer spots her NSA badge, pulls his gun and tries to subdue her. As Gibbs, DiNozzo and McGee rush to help Bishop, they find she has already wrestled the man to the ground and is holding her own gun on him.

Investigating the killer further, Bishop determines that the killer was working for one of the defense contractors in the earlier briefing, who was trying to embarrass the SECNAV because she is a civilian who never served in uniform.

Later Bishop meets privately with Gibbs and apologizes for not being a team player. Gibbs has pulled Bishop's application to NCIS she made before she started working at the NSA and offers her a joint duty assignment with NCIS.

== Production ==
"Gut Check" is written by Christopher J. Wald and directed by Dennis Smith. As reported back in August 2013, a new character would be introduced as Ziva's replacement. "Casting intel" revealed her name to be "Bishop", with filming set to begin in mid-October. Bishop was described as a "twenty something female[;] bright, educated, athletic, attractive, fresh-faced, focused and somewhat socially awkward". In September Emily Wickersham was announced to play the role of Bishop, and was set to appear during "November sweeps". The initial deal included a three-episode arc, with a potential to become a regular. Two weeks prior to her introduction, Wickersham was made a regular. The press release listed her as a regular for the episode, but when the episode aired she was credited as "guest starring".

Executive producer Gary Glasberg explained the reason behind choosing Wickersham to be because "We were seeing [...] moments and scenes and a connection with our characters that we all really responded to".

== Reception ==
"Gut Check" was seen by 19.66 million live viewers at its November 19, 2013 broadcast, with a 3.0/9 share among adults aged 18 to 49. A rating point represents one percent of the total number of television sets in American households, and a share means the percentage of television sets in use tuned to the program. In total viewers, "Gut Check" was the highest rated show on the night it aired.

Douglas Wolfe from TV Fanatic gave the episode 4.8/5 and stated that "The NCIS writers knocked this one out of the ball park, thanks to a story that introduced us to NSA Agent Eleanor "Ellie" Bishop. [...] The genius of the case itself was that it provided an almost perfect vehicle to introduce Ellie Bishop."
