= Rocky Carroll =

American actor (born 1963)

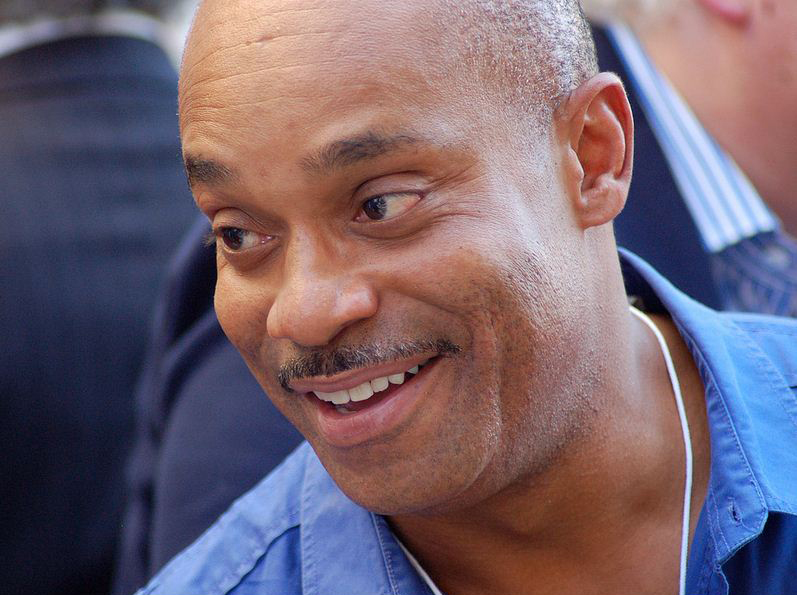
- Carroll in 2012
- Born: Roscoe Carroll; July 8, 1963 (age 63); Cincinnati, Ohio, U.S.
- Education: School for Creative and Performing Arts; Webster University
- Occupations: Actor; director
- Years active: 1984–present
- Known for: Joey Emerson – Roc; Director Leon Vance – NCIS
- Height: 5 ft 10 in (178 cm)
- Spouse: Gabrielle Bullock (m. 1996)
- Children: 1

Roscoe "Rocky" Carroll (born July 8, 1963) is an American actor and director. He is known for his roles as Joey Emerson on the Fox comedy-drama Roc (1991–94), as Dr. Keith Wilkes on the CBS medical drama Chicago Hope, and as NCIS Director Leon Vance on the CBS drama NCIS and its spin-offs Los Angeles and New Orleans. He also played a supporting role in the 1995 thriller film Crimson Tide.

== Early life and education ==
Carroll was born Roscoe Carroll in Cincinnati, Ohio, on July 8, 1963. His acting career is rooted in the theater. In 1981, Carroll graduated from the famed School for Creative and Performing Arts (SCPA) in Cincinnati Ohio, in the Cincinnati Public School District. Determined to further his knowledge of acting, he attended The Conservatory of Theatre Arts at Webster University in St. Louis, where he graduated with a B.F.A. degree. Carroll would later receive an honorary degree from his alma mater in 2009. After graduating, Carroll decided to test the waters by moving to New York City, the heart of the theater community. There, he introduced many young children to the works of William Shakespeare by participating in Joe Papp's "Shakespeare on Broadway" series.

== Career ==
As part of Joe Papp's acclaimed New York Shakespeare Festival, Carroll helped to open doors for actors of color, by taking on non-traditional roles that were rarely portrayed by Black actors in Shakespeare dramas. In 1987, Carroll was introduced to the works of August Wilson. The up-and-coming and talented young actor was allowed to recreate his role for the Broadway production of Wilson's critically acclaimed story The Piano Lesson. The play not only earned a Pulitzer Prize for Drama, but Carroll earned a Tony and Drama Desk nomination.

He is known for portraying ne'er-do-well musician Joey Emerson on the FOX comedy-drama Roc. He also had a starring role as Dr. Keith Wilkes in the TV series Chicago Hope. Carroll has guest starred in several other TV programs including The Agency, Boston Legal, Family Law, The West Wing, Law & Order, The Game, ER and Grey's Anatomy. Carroll has had roles in many Hollywood films such as Born on the Fourth of July, The Ladies Man, Crimson Tide, The Great White Hype, Prelude to a Kiss, The Chase, Best Laid Plans and Yes Man.

In the fifth season of the CBS drama NCIS, Carroll was featured in a recurring role as Assistant Director Leon Vance. In doing so, he had been reunited with his Chicago Hope castmates Mark Harmon and Lauren Holly. After the death of NCIS director Jenny Shepard (played by Holly), his character became the new director of NCIS and replaced Holly in the main cast. He has also guest-starred as Vance in the NCIS spin-offs Los Angeles and New Orleans.

In addition to being a series regular on NCIS, Carroll has also directed episodes of NCIS, starting in 2015, making his directorial debut with the Season 12 episode, "We Build, We Fight".

Carroll departed NCIS in March 2026 after 19 seasons, with the series's 500th episode (All Good Things - Season 23 Episode 13) serving as his final appearance, although he'll continue his directorial duties there.

== Personal life ==
Carroll married Gabrielle Bullock in 1996. They have one daughter.

== Filmography ==
=== Film ===
Year	Title	Role	Notes
1989	Born on the Fourth of July	Willie	
1992	Prelude to a Kiss	Tom	
1994	The Chase	Byron Wilder	
1995	Crimson Tide	Lieutenant Darik Westerguard	
1996	The Great White Hype	Artemus St. John Saint	
1999	Best Laid Plans	Bad Ass Dude	
2000	The Ladies Man	Cyrus Cunningham	
2008	Yes Man	Wesley T. "Wes" Parker	
2014	Justice League: War	Silas Stone	Voice, direct-to-video
2018	The Death of Superman	Silas Stone, Perry White	Voice, direct-to-video
2019	Reign of the Supermen	Perry White	Voice, direct-to-video

=== Television ===
Year	Title	Role	Notes
1989	Money, Power, Murder	Dwan	Television movie
1990	Law & Order	Dr. Davids	Episode: "Prescription for Death"
1991	American Experience	James Gooding	Voice, episode: "The Massachusetts 54th Colored Infantry"
1991–1994	Roc	Joey Emerson	72 episodes
1994–1996	Gargoyles	Derek Maza, Talon, Glasses	Voice, 9 episodes
1995	Fantastic Four	Triton (Marvel Comics)	Voice, 2 episodes
1996–2000	Chicago Hope	Dr. Keith Wilkes	96 episodes
1997	Five Desperate Hours	Lieutenant Frank Early	Television movie
1998	Hercules	Hylas	Voice, episode: "Hercules and the Poseidon's Cup Adventure"
2000–2001	Welcome to New York	Adrian Spencer	15 episodes
2001	The West Wing	Corey Sykes	Episode: "The Drop In"
2001	Family Law	U.S. Attorney Skidmore	2 episodes
2001–2003	The Agency	Carl Reese	45 episodes
2004	ER	Mr. Walker	Episode: "The Student"
2004	Father of the Pride	Chaz	Voice, episode: "One Man's Meat Is Another Man's Girlfriend"
2004	Boston Legal	Assistant District Attorney John Shubert	Episode: "Hired Guns"
2004–2005	American Dreams	Reverend Kingston Davis	2 episodes
2005	Kevin Hill	Tony Banks	Episode: "Occupational Hazard"
2005–2006	Invasion	Healy	4 episodes
2006–2007	The Game	Kenny "Coach T" Taylor	4 episodes
2007	Grey's Anatomy	James Miller	Episode: "Haunt You Every Day"
2008–2026	NCIS	Leon Vance	Recurring role (Season 5), Main role (Season 6–Season 23), 390+ episodes
2009–2014	NCIS: Los Angeles	Leon Vance	10 episodes
2011	Glenn Martin, DDS	Various	Voice, episode: "Date with Destiny"
2014	Blue	Robert	2 episodes
2014	NCIS: New Orleans	Leon Vance	3 episodes
2017	The Immortal Life of Henrietta Lacks	Sonny Lacks	Television film
2022	NCIS: Hawaiʻi	Leon Vance	Episode: "T'N'T"

=== Video games ===
Year	Title	Role	Notes
1993	Gabriel Knight: Sins of the Fathers	Willy Walker	
2004	Spider-Man 2	Additional voices	

=== Director ===
Year	Title	Note(s)
2015–	NCIS	30+ episodes
2020	Magnum P.I.	Episode: "May the Best One Win"

== Awards and nominations ==
Year	Association	Category	Nominated work	Result
1997	Screen Actors Guild Awards	Outstanding Performance by an Ensemble in a Drama Series	Chicago Hope	Nominated
1998	Screen Actors Guild Awards	Outstanding Performance by an Ensemble in a Drama Series	Chicago Hope	Nominated
1998	NAACP Image Awards	Outstanding Actor in a Drama Series	Chicago Hope	Nominated
1999	NAACP Image Awards	Outstanding Actor in a Drama Series	Chicago Hope	Nominated
2010	NAACP Image Awards	Outstanding Supporting Actor in a Drama Series	NCIS	Nominated
2013	NAACP Image Awards	Outstanding Supporting Actor in a Drama Series	NCIS	Nominated
