= Emily Wickersham =

American actress (born 1984)

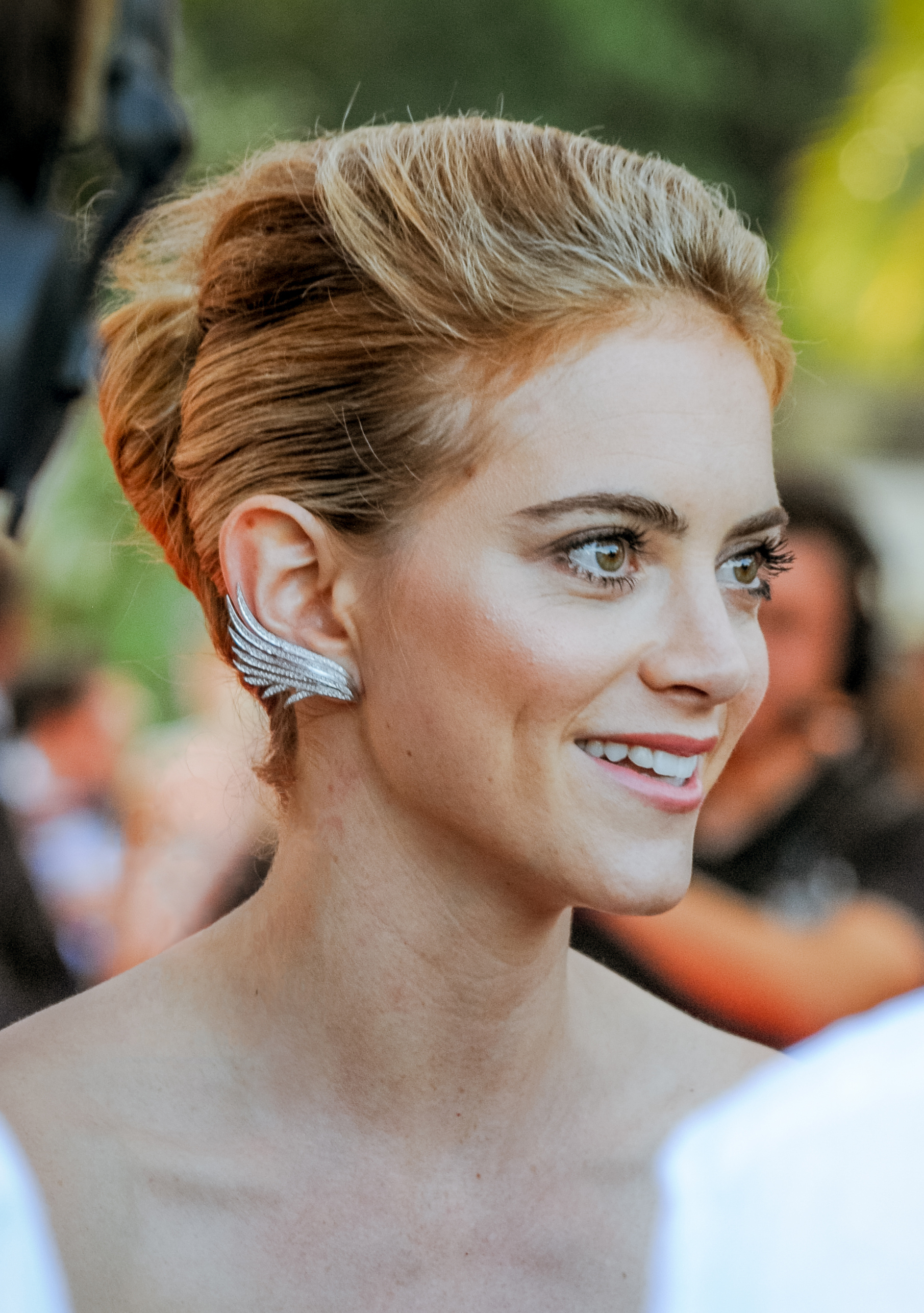
- Wickersham at the 2014 Monte-Carlo Television Festival
- Born: April 26, 1984 (age 42); Kansas, U.S.
- Occupation: Actress
- Years active: 2006–present
- Spouse(s): Blake Hanley (m. 2010; div. 2018) James Badge Dale (m. 2024)
- Children: 2

Emily Wickersham (born April 26, 1984) is an American actress best known for her role as NCIS Special Agent Eleanor Bishop on NCIS.

== Early life ==
Wickersham has Austrian and Swedish ancestry. She was born in Kansas and grew up in Mamaroneck, New York. After graduating from Mamaroneck High School in 2002, she attended Muhlenberg College for two years before dropping out.

== Career ==
In 2013, prior to the departure of actress Cote de Pablo, Wickersham was cast as NSA Analyst Eleanor "Ellie" Bishop in a three-episode arc starting from Season 11 of NCIS, starting November 19, 2013, on CBS. She was subsequently promoted to series regular, and her character officially became an NCIS Special Agent. Following the conclusion of the show's 18th season on May 26, 2021, Wickersham confirmed her departure from the show after eight years via Instagram. She returned as a guest star in season 23.

Wickersham has also appeared in the feature film Gone and has made a number of guest appearances on television.

== Personal life ==
She married musician Blake Hanley on November 23, 2010, on Little Palm Island in the Florida Keys. They divorced in December 2018.

In 2021, she had a son with her boyfriend, James Badge Dale. They married in September 2024. In October 2024, they had their second child.

Her great-grandfather was the football player Isadore Anderson.

== Filmography ==
=== Film ===
Year	Title	Role	Notes
2007	Gardener of Eden	Kate	
2008	Definitely, Maybe	1998 Intern	
2009	How I Got Lost	Taylor	
2009	Taking Chance	Petty Officer Kelley Phelps	
2010	Remember Me	Miami Blonde	
2011	I Am Number Four	Nicole	
2012	Gone	Molly Conway	
2015	Glitch	Vanessa	

=== Television ===
Year	Title	Role	Notes
2006	Late Show with David Letterman	Jules	Episode dated January 25
2006	Parco P.I.	Grace Carr	Episode: "Just Another Pretty Face"
2006–2007	The Sopranos	Rhiannon Flammer	Recurring role (season 6)
2007	The Bronx Is Burning	Jennifer Steinbrenner	Episode: "Caught!"
2007	The Gamekillers	The Girl	Episode: "Marcus & Aja"
2007	Mitch Albom's for One More Day	Maria Benetto Lang	TV movie
2009	Taking Chance	Kelley Phelps	TV movie
2009	Law & Order: Criminal Intent	Ceci Madison	Episode: "Major Case"
2009	Bored to Death	Emily	Episode: "The Case of the Stolen Skateboard"
2009	Trauma	Jessica	Episode: "Stuck"
2011	Gossip Girl	Leading Lady	Episode: "Yes, Then Zero"
2013	The Bridge	Kate Millwright	Episodes: "Rio", "Maria of the Desert" and "Old Friends"
2013–2021 & 2025–2026	NCIS	Eleanor "Ellie" Bishop	Main role (seasons 11–18); guest (season 23)
2016	NCIS: New Orleans	Eleanor "Ellie" Bishop	Episode: "Sister City: Part 2"
2026	NCIS: Origins	Eleanor "Ellie" Bishop	3 episodes
