= Angie Dickinson =

American actress (born 1931)

- Dickinson in 1982
- Born: Angeline Brown; September 30, 1931 (age 95); Kulm, North Dakota, U.S.
- Education: Immaculate Heart College
- Occupation: Actress
- Years active: 1954–2009
- Spouses: Gene Dickinson (m. 1952; div. 1960) Burt Bacharach (m. 1965; div. 1981)
- Children: 1

Angeline Dickinson (née Brown; September 30, 1931) is a retired American actress. She began her career on television, appearing in many anthology series during the 1950s, before gaining her breakthrough role in Gun the Man Down (1956) with James Arness and the Western film Rio Bravo (1959) with John Wayne and Dean Martin, for which she received the Golden Globe Award for New Star of the Year.

Dickinson has appeared in more than 50 films, including China Gate (1957), Cry Terror! (1958), Ocean's 11 (1960), Rio Bravo (1960), The Sins of Rachel Cade (1961), Jessica (1962), Captain Newman, M.D. (1963), The Killers (1964), The Art of Love (1965), The Chase (1966), Point Blank (1967), Pretty Maids All in a Row (1971), The Outside Man (1972), Big Bad Mama (1974), and Dressed to Kill (1980).

From 1974 to 1978, Dickinson starred as Sergeant "Pepper" Anderson in the NBC crime series Police Woman, for which she received the Golden Globe Award for Best Actress – Television Series Drama and three Primetime Emmy Award for Outstanding Lead Actress in a Drama Series nominations. She starred in Brian De Palma's erotic crime thriller Dressed to Kill (1980), for which she received a Saturn Award for Best Actress.

During her later career, Dickinson starred in several television movies and miniseries including Hollywood Wives (1985) and Wild Palms (1993), also playing supporting roles in films such as Even Cowgirls Get the Blues (1994), Sabrina (1995), Pay It Forward (2000), and Big Bad Love (2001). Her last performance to date was in the Hallmark Channel film Mending Fences (2009).

== Early life ==
Dickinson, the middle of three daughters, was born Angeline Brown (called "Angie" by family and friends) in Kulm, North Dakota, the daughter of Fredericka (née Hehr) and Leo Henry Brown. Her parents were both of German descent, with the family surname originally being "Braun". She was raised Roman Catholic. Her father was a small-town newspaper publisher and editor, working on the Kulm Messenger and the Edgeley Mail. She fell in love with movies at an early age, as her father was also the projectionist at the town's only movie theater until it burned down.

In 1942, when she was 10 years old, the Brown family moved to Burbank, California, where Angie attended Bellarmine-Jefferson High School, graduating in 1947 at age 15. The previous year, she had won the Sixth Annual Bill of Rights essay contest. She then studied at Glendale Community College and at Immaculate Heart College, Los Angeles, where she graduated in 1954 with a business degree. Taking a cue from her publisher father, she had intended to be a writer.

While a student during 1950–1952, she worked as a secretary at Lockheed Air Terminal in Burbank (now Bob Hope Airport) and in a parts factory. She became Angie Dickinson in 1952, when she married football player Gene Dickinson.

== Career ==
=== Early television career ===
Dickinson came in second at a local preliminary for the Miss America contest, and that got the attention of a casting agent, who landed her a spot as one of six showgirls on The Jimmy Durante Show. The exposure brought her to the attention of a television-industry producer, who asked her to consider a career in acting. She studied the craft and a few years later was approached by NBC to guest-star on a number of variety shows, including The Colgate Comedy Hour. She soon met Frank Sinatra, who became a lifelong friend.

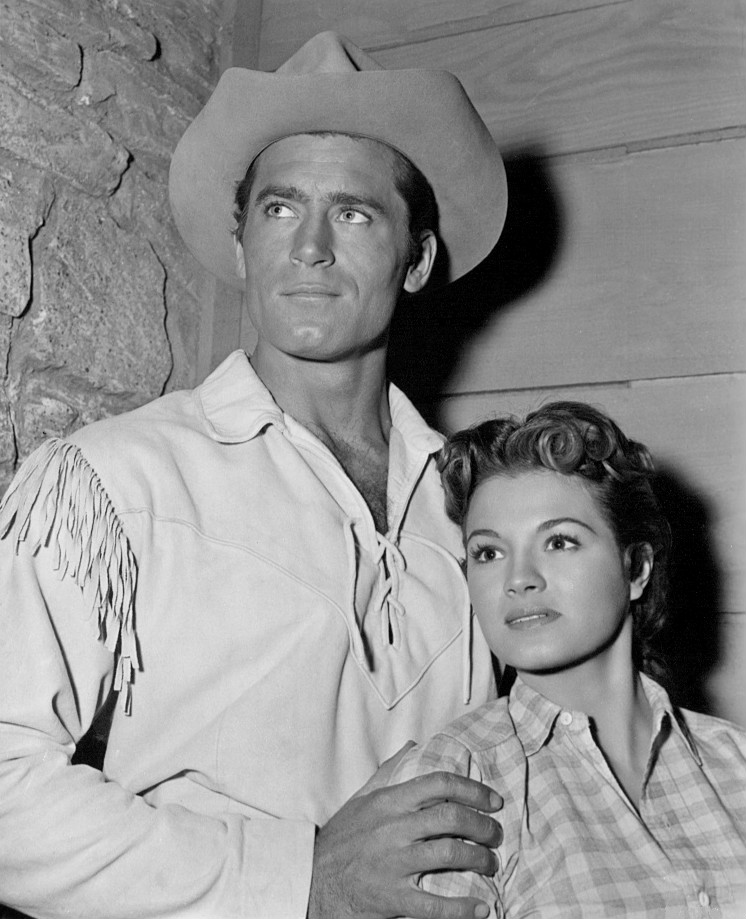
With Clint Walker in Cheyenne, around 1957

On New Year's Eve 1954, Dickinson made her television acting debut in an episode of Death Valley Days. This led to roles in such productions as Matinee Theatre (eight episodes), Buffalo Bill, Jr., City Detective, It's a Great Life (two episodes), The Gray Ghost, General Electric Theater, Broken Arrow, The People's Choice (twice), Meet McGraw (twice), Northwest Passage, Gunsmoke, The Virginian, Tombstone Territory, Cheyenne, and The Restless Gun.

In 1956, Dickinson appeared in an episode of The Life and Legend of Wyatt Earp. The next year, she took another small role in Richard Boone's series Have Gun – Will Travel in the episode "A Matter of Ethics".

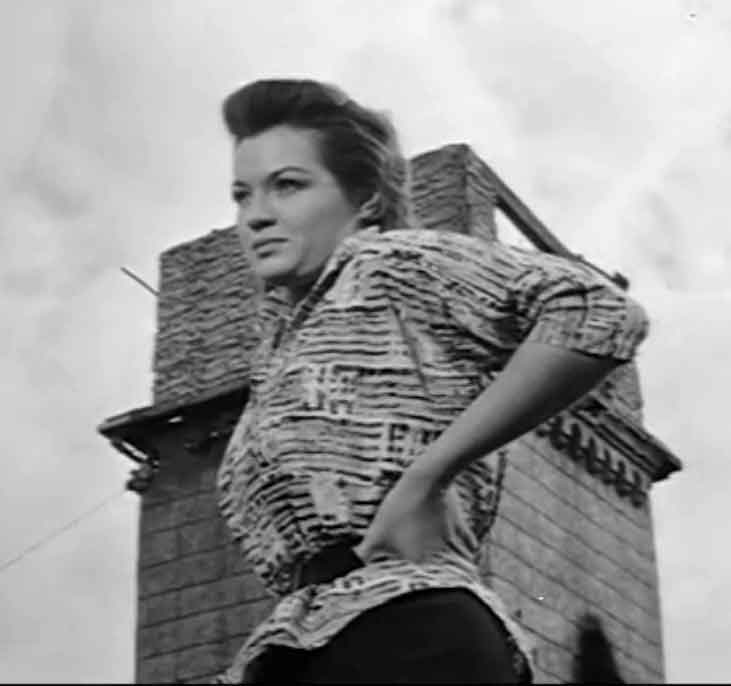
Angie Dickinson wore yellowface to play a Chinese-European character in China Gate (1957).

In 1958, Dickinson was cast as Laura Meadows in the episode "The Deserters" of an ABC/Warner Bros. Western series, Colt .45, with Wayde Preston. That year, she also played the role of defendant Mrs. Fargo in the Perry Mason episode "The Case of the One-Eyed Witness".

Dickinson went on to create memorable characters in Mike Hammer, Wagon Train, and Men into Space. In 1965, she had a recurring role as Carol Tredman on NBC's Dr. Kildare. She had a role as the duplicitous murder conspirator in a 1964 episode of The Fugitive series with David Janssen and fellow guest star Robert Duvall. She played an unfaithful wife and bank robber in the 1958 "Wild Blue Yonder" episode of Rod Cameron's syndicated television series State Trooper. She starred in two Alfred Hitchcock Hour episodes, "Captive Audience" with James Mason on October 18, 1962, and "Thanatos Palace Hotel" with Steven Hill on January 31, 1965.

=== First film roles ===
Dickinson's motion-picture career began with a small, uncredited role in Lucky Me (1954) starring Doris Day, followed by The Return of Jack Slade (1955), Man with the Gun (1955) and Hidden Guns (1956). She had her first starring role in Gun the Man Down (1956) with James Arness, followed by the Sam Fuller cult film China Gate (1957), which depicted an early view of the Vietnam War.

Rejecting the Marilyn Monroe/Jayne Mansfield style of platinum blonde sex symbolism, because she felt it would narrow her acting options, Dickinson initially allowed studios to lighten her naturally brunette hair to honey-blonde. She appeared early in her career mainly in B-movies or Westerns, including Shoot-Out at Medicine Bend (1957), in which she co-starred with Randolph Scott and James Garner. In the crime drama Cry Terror! (1958), Dickinson had a supporting role opposite James Mason and Rod Steiger as a femme fatale.

=== Hollywood Leading lady ===
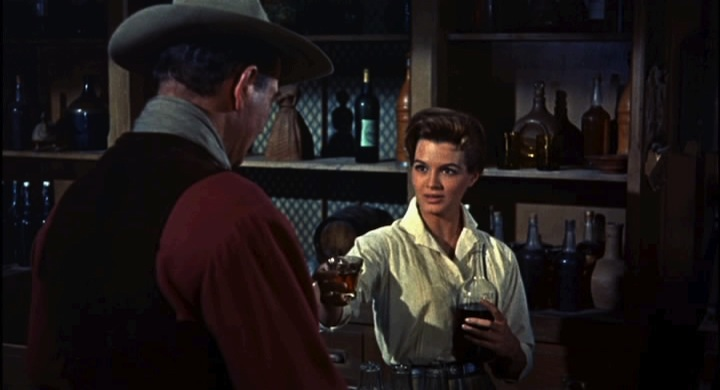
Dickinson with John Wayne in Rio Bravo

Dickinson's big-screen breakthrough role came in Howard Hawks' Rio Bravo (1959), in which she played a flirtatious gambler called "Feathers", who becomes attracted to the town sheriff played by Dickinson's childhood idol John Wayne. The film co-starred Dean Martin, Ricky Nelson, and Walter Brennan.

When Hawks sold her personal contract with him to a major studio without her knowledge, she was unhappy. Dickinson nonetheless became one of the more prominent leading ladies of the next decade, beginning with film The Bramble Bush with Richard Burton. She also took a supporting role in Ocean's 11 (1960) with friends Sinatra and Martin.

These were followed by a political potboiler, A Fever in the Blood (1961); a Belgian Congo-based melodrama, The Sins of Rachel Cade (1961), in which she played a missionary nurse tempted by lust; a scheming woman in Rome Adventure (1962), filmed in Italy; and the title role in Jean Negulesco's Jessica (1962) with Maurice Chevalier, in which she played a young midwife resented by the married women of the town, set in Sicily. Angie also shared the screen with friend Gregory Peck as a military nurse in the dark comedy Captain Newman, M.D. (1963).

For The Killers (1964), originally intended to be the first made-for-television movie, but released to theaters due to its violent content and entertainment value, Dickinson played a femme fatale opposite future U.S. President Ronald Reagan in his last movie role. Directed by Don Siegel, it was a remake of the 1946 version based on a story by Ernest Hemingway and the only film Reagan made in which he was cast as a villain. He viciously slaps Dickinson in one of the film's scenes.

Dickinson co-starred in the comedy The Art of Love (1965), playing the love interest of both James Garner and Dick Van Dyke. She joined a star-studded Arthur Penn/Sam Spiegel production, The Chase (1966), along with Marlon Brando, Jane Fonda, Robert Redford, and Robert Duvall. That same year, she was featured in Cast a Giant Shadow, a war story with Kirk Douglas.

Dickinson's best movie of this era is considered to be John Boorman's cult classic Point Blank (1967), a crime drama with Lee Marvin, a criminal who is out for revenge after being betrayed by his wife and his best friend. The film has been described as epitomizing the stark urban mood of the period, while its reputation has grown through the years.

Westerns continued to be a part of her work in the late 1960s, when she starred in The Last Challenge opposite Glenn Ford, in Young Billy Young with Robert Mitchum, and Sam Whiskey with Burt Reynolds.

In 1971, she played a lascivious substitute high-school teacher in the dark comedy Pretty Maids All in a Row which also starred Rock Hudson and Telly Savalas, for director Roger Vadim and writer-producer Gene Roddenberry. In the film, her character seduces a sexually inexperienced student, portrayed by John David Carson, against the backdrop of a series of murders of female students at the same high school. Pretty Maids All In A Row drew hostile critical reviews, and was a box-office failure.

Also in 1971, she portrayed the ambitious wife of Robert Culp in the television movie See the Man Run, and starred alongside Leslie Nielsen in The Resurrection of Zachary Wheeler. In The Outside Man (1972), a French movie shot in Los Angeles, with Jean-Louis Trintignant, directed by Jacques Deray, she plays the beautiful but corrupt wife of a mobster. In 1973, she co-starred with Roy Thinnes in the supernatural thriller The Norliss Tapes, a television movie produced and directed by Dan Curtis that in later years attained a modest cult following.

One of Dickinson's best-known and most sexually provocative movie roles followed, that of the tawdry widow Wilma McClatchie from the Great Depression romp Big Bad Mama (1974) with William Shatner and Tom Skerritt. In her 40s at the time, she appeared nude in several scenes, which created interest in the movie and a new generation of male fans for Dickinson.

A 1966 Esquire cover gained Dickinson additional fame and notoriety, her having posed in nothing but a sweater and a pair of panty hose. The photo became so iconic, that while celebrating the magazine's 70th anniversary in 2003, the Dickinson pose was recreated for the cover by Britney Spears.

=== Police Woman ===
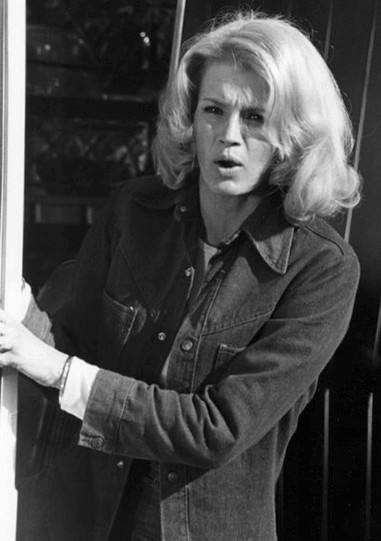
Dickinson in Police Woman, 1976

Dickinson returned to the small screen in March 1974 for an episode of the critically acclaimed hit anthology series Police Story. The guest appearance proved to be so popular, NBC offered Dickinson her own television show, which became a ground-breaking weekly series called Police Woman. At first, Dickinson was reluctant, but when producers told her she could become a household name, she accepted the role. It co-starred Earl Holliman as Sergeant Bill Crowley, Anderson's commanding officer, along with Charles Dierkop as investigator Pete Royster and Ed Bernard as investigator Joe Styles. In the series, Dickinson played Sergeant "Pepper" Anderson, an officer of the Los Angeles Police Department's Criminal Conspiracy Unit, who often works undercover. The series became a hit, reaching number one in many countries in which it aired during its first year. It ran for four seasons and Dickinson won a Golden Globe Award, and received Emmy Award nominations for Best Lead Actress in a Dramatic Series three consecutive years. However, in a 2019 interview, Dickinson said that she regretted having done the series, since the remuneration was inadequate and it left her with little time for other projects.

Dickinson acknowledged her sex symbol role, stating "Are my legs exploited? Well, that's all I have got to sell". While observing that "essentially a woman's job is being a woman", she disliked repeatedly doing Police Woman scenes "where the phone rings while I'm taking a bath". In 1978, the same year the show ended, Dickinson reprised her Pepper Anderson character on the television special Ringo, co-starring with Ringo Starr and John Ritter. She also parodied the role in the 1975 and 1979 Bob Hope Christmas specials for NBC. She did the same years later on the 1987 Christmas episode of NBC's Saturday Night Live.

According to Dickinson, Police Woman caused a surge of applications for employment from women to police departments around the United States.

Dickinson and Police Woman influenced later female-starring, hour-long TV series such as Charlie's Angels, Wonder Woman, The Bionic Woman, and Cagney & Lacey. In 1987, the Los Angeles Police Department awarded Dickinson an honorary doctorate, which led her to quip, "Now you can call me Doctor Pepper."

On occasion during the 1970s, Dickinson took part in the popular Dean Martin Celebrity Roast on television, and she was the guest of honor on August 2, 1977, roasted by a dais of celebrities that included James Stewart, Orson Welles, and her Police Woman series co-star Earl Holliman.

=== The 1980s ===
Having done a television series plus the miniseries Pearl (1978) about the Pearl Harbor bombing of 1941, Dickinson's career in feature films appeared to be in decline, but she returned to the big screen in Brian De Palma's erotic thriller Dressed to Kill (1980), for which she gained considerable notice, particularly for a long, silent scene in a museum before the character meets her fate. The role of Kate Miller, a sexually frustrated New York housewife, earned her a 1981 Saturn Award for Best Actress. "The performers are excellent," wrote Vincent Canby in his July 25, 1980 The New York Times review, "especially Miss Dickinson."

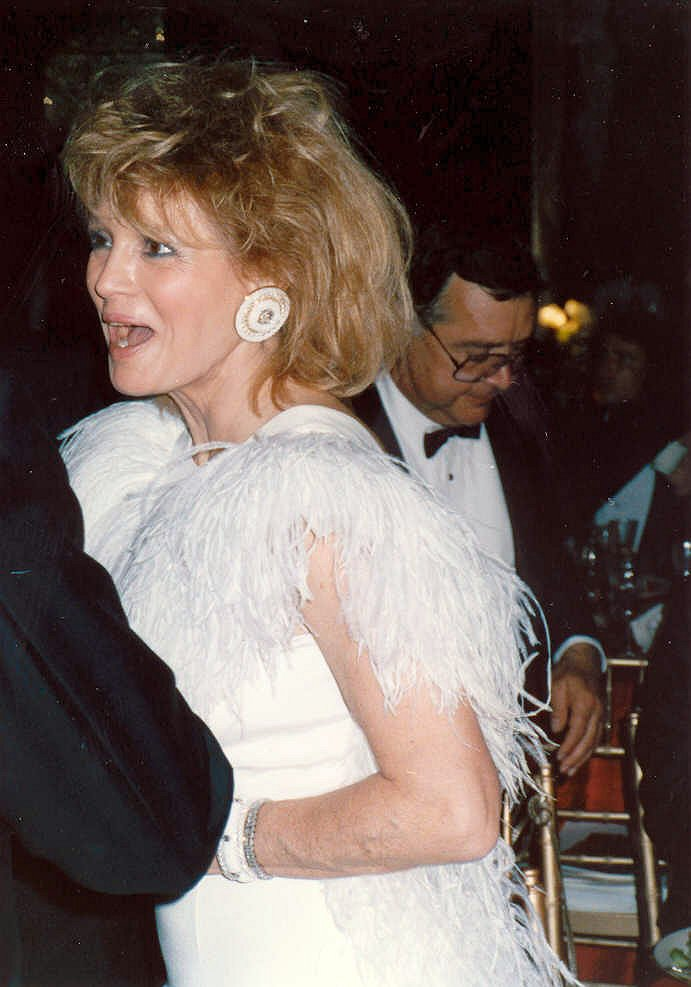
Angie Dickinson at 61st Academy Awards in 1989

She took a less substantial role in Death Hunt (1981), which reunited her with Lee Marvin, and also appeared in Charlie Chan and the Curse of the Dragon Queen. Earlier that year, she had been the first choice to play the character Krystle Carrington on the television series Dynasty, but deciding she wanted to spend more time with her daughter, she turned it down; the role instead went to Linda Evans. In the mid-1980s, Dickinson declined the role of Sable Colby on the Dynasty spin-off, The Colbys.

After turning down her own Johnny Carson-produced prospective sitcom, The Angie Dickinson Show, in 1980 after only two episodes had been shot because she did not feel she was funny enough, the private-eye series Cassie & Co. became her unsuccessful attempt at a television comeback. She then starred in several television movies, such as One Shoe Makes It Murder (1982), Jealousy (1984), A Touch of Scandal (1984), and Stillwatch (1987). She had a pivotal role in the highly rated miniseries Hollywood Wives (1985), based on a novel by Jackie Collins.

In 1982, and again in 1986, Dickinson appeared in two of Perry Como's Christmas specials for the ABC television network, in both of which she did something she was not known to have done before: singing. Dickinson later denied having sung on camera since the two Como specials in an interview with Larry King, which he conducted at the approximate time of her appearance in Duets.

In motion pictures, Dickinson reprised her role as Wilma McClatchie for Big Bad Mama II (1987) and completed the television movie Kojak: Fatal Flaw, in which she was reunited with Telly Savalas. She co-starred with Willie Nelson and numerous buddies in the television Western Once Upon a Texas Train (1988).

She was presented one of the Golden Boot Awards in 1989 for her contributions to Western cinema.

=== 1990s and 2000s ===
In the ABC miniseries Wild Palms (1993), produced by Oliver Stone, she was the sadistic, militant sister of Senator Tony Kruetzer, played by Robert Loggia. That same year, she starred as a ruthless Montana spa owner in Gus Van Sant's Even Cowgirls Get the Blues with Uma Thurman. In November of that year, she walked off the set of a proposed This Is Your Life special for her, refusing to participate in the show.

In 1995, Sydney Pollack cast her as the prospective mother-in-law of Greg Kinnear in the romantic comedy Sabrina starring Harrison Ford, a remake of the Billy Wilder classic. She played Burt Reynolds' wife in the thriller The Maddening and the mother of Rick Aiello and Robert Cicchini in the National Lampoon comedy The Don's Analyst. In 1997, she seduced old flame Artie (Rip Torn) in an episode of HBO's The Larry Sanders Show called "Artie and Angie and Hank and Hercules".

Dickinson played the alcoholic, homeless mother of Helen Hunt's character in Pay It Forward (2000), the grandmother of Gwyneth Paltrow's character in the drama Duets (2000), and the mother of Arliss Howard's character in Big Bad Love (2001), co-starring Debra Winger.

Having appeared in the original Ocean's 11 (1960) with good friends Frank Sinatra and Dean Martin, four decades later, she made a brief cameo in the 2001 remake with George Clooney and Brad Pitt.

An avid poker player, during the summer of 2004, she participated in the second season of Bravo's Celebrity Poker Showdown. After announcing her name, host Dave Foley said, "Sometimes, when we say 'celebrity', we actually mean it." Also in 2004, Dickinson appeared in the comedy Elvis Has Left the Building, playing an ex-mechanic and the mother of Kim Basinger's character.

Dickinson was inducted into the state of North Dakota's Rough Rider Award Hall of Fame in 1992.

In 1999, Playboy ranked Dickinson number 42 on their list of the "100 Sexiest Stars of the Century". In 2002, TV Guide ranked her number three on a list of the "50 Sexiest Television Stars of All Time", behind Diana Rigg and George Clooney (who tied for number one).

In 2009, Dickinson starred in a Hallmark Channel drama, Mending Fences co-starring Laura Leighton. It is her last acting credit to date.

== Personal life ==
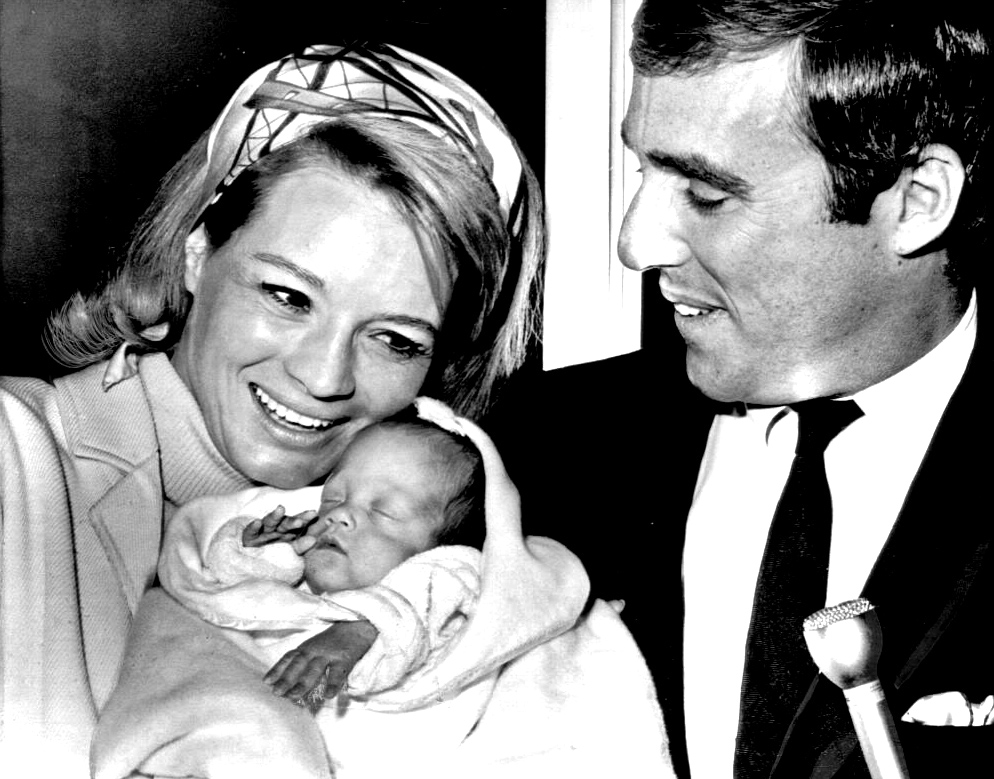
With husband, the composer Burt Bacharach and new-born, 1966

Dickinson was married to Gene Dickinson, a college football player who later moved into the electronics business, from 1952 to 1960, though they separated in 1956. During her marriage, Dickinson became close friends with John Kenneth Galbraith and Catherine Galbraith. Her visits to them and her touring when Galbraith was U.S. Ambassador to India are amply recounted in his memoirs Ambassador's Journal and A Life in Our Times. Dickinson kept her married name after their divorce.

She married composer Burt Bacharach in 1965. They remained a married couple for 16 years; late in their marriage they had a period of separation during which they dated other people. Bacharach's and Dickinson's daughter Nikki was born in 1966, 3 months prematurely. Nikki struggled with visual impairment due to the prematurity, as well as Asperger syndrome that went undiagnosed until she was in her 30s. She died by suicide in 2007. Burt Bacharach died in 2023.

Dickinson had a relationship with musician Billy Vera in the 1980s and appeared in the music video for his single "I Can Take Care of Myself". For several years in the 1990s, Dickinson dated radio and television interviewer Larry King.

In 2023, Dickinson stated that she had a 20-year on-and-off affair with Frank Sinatra. She said he was the love of her life and "one of the most charismatic men that ever was" .

In a 2006 interview with NPR, Dickinson stated that she was a Democrat. She campaigned for Kennedy's presidential campaign in 1960 and supported Lyndon B. Johnson in 1964.

There is a street named after Dickinson in San Antonio, Texas.

== Awards and nominations ==
Year	Award	Category	Nominated work	Results	Ref.
1989	Golden Boot Awards	Golden Boot	—N/a	Won	
1959	Golden Globe Awards	Most Promising Newcomer – Female	Rio Bravo	Won	
1974	Golden Globe Awards	Best Actress in a Television Series – Drama	Police Woman	Won	
1975	Golden Globe Awards	Best Actress in a Television Series – Drama	Police Woman	Nominated	
1976	Golden Globe Awards	Best Actress in a Television Series – Drama	Police Woman	Nominated	
1977	Golden Globe Awards	Best Actress in a Television Series – Drama	Police Woman	Nominated	
1975	Primetime Emmy Awards	Outstanding Lead Actress in a Drama Series	Police Woman	Nominated	
1976	Primetime Emmy Awards	Outstanding Lead Actress in a Drama Series	Police Woman	Nominated	
1977	Primetime Emmy Awards	Outstanding Lead Actress in a Drama Series	Police Woman	Nominated	
1980	Saturn Awards	Best Actress	Dressed to Kill	Won	

=== Other honors ===
Year	Honor	Category	Result	Ref.
1987	Hollywood Walk of Fame	Television	Inducted	

== Filmography ==
=== Film ===
Year	Title	Role	Notes
1954	Lucky Me	Party Guest	Uncredited
1955	Tennessee's Partner	Abby Dean	
1955	The Return of Jack Slade	Polly Logan	
1955	Man with the Gun	Kitty	Uncredited
1956	Down Liberty Road	Mary	Short film
1956	Hidden Guns	Becky Carter	
1956	Tension at Table Rock	Cathy	
1956	Gun the Man Down	Janice	
1956	The Black Whip	Sally Morrow	
1957	Shoot-Out at Medicine Bend	Priscilla King	
1957	China Gate	Lucky Legs	
1957	Calypso Joe	Julie	
1958	I Married a Woman	Screen Wife	
1958	Cry Terror!	Eileen Kelly	
1959	Rio Bravo	Feathers	
1959	I'll Give My Life	Alice Greenway Bradford	
1960	The Bramble Bush	Fran	
1960	Ocean's 11	Beatrice Ocean	
1961	A Fever in the Blood	Cathy Simon	
1961	The Sins of Rachel Cade	Rachel Cade	
1962	Jessica	Jessica Brown Visconti	
1962	Rome Adventure	Lyda Kent	
1963	Captain Newman, M.D.	Lt. Francie Corum	
1964	The Killers	Sheila Farr	
1965	The Art of Love	Laurie Gibson	
1966	The Chase	Ruby Calder	
1966	Cast a Giant Shadow	Emma Marcus	
1967	Point Blank	Chris	
1967	The Last Challenge	Lisa Denton	
1969	Sam Whiskey	Laura Breckenridge	
1969	Some Kind of a Nut	Rachel Amidon	
1969	Young Billy Young	Lily Beloit	
1971	Pretty Maids All in a Row	Miss Betty Smith	
1971	The Resurrection of Zachary Wheeler	Dr. Layle Johnson	
1972	The Outside Man	Jackie Kovacs	
1974	Big Bad Mama	Wilma McClatchie	
1979	Jigsaw	Karen	a.k.a. L'Homme en colère
1980	Klondike Fever	Belinda McNair	
1980	Dressed to Kill	Kate Miller	
1981	Charlie Chan and the Curse of the Dragon Queen	Dragon Queen	
1981	Death Hunt	Vanessa McBride	
1984	Terror in the Aisles	Kate Miller	Archival footage
1987	Big Bad Mama II	Wilma McClatchie	
1993	Even Cowgirls Get the Blues	Miss Adrian	
1995	Sabrina	Ingrid Tyson	
1996	The Maddening	Georgina Scudder	
1996	The Sun, the Moon and the Stars	Abbie McGee	
2000	The Last Producer	Poker Player	
2000	Duets	Blair	
2000	Pay It Forward	Grace	
2001	Big Bad Love	Mrs. Barlow	
2001	Ocean's Eleven	Boxing Spectator	Remake of the 1960 film
2004	Elvis Has Left the Building	Bobette	

=== Television films ===
Year	Title	Role
1966	The Poppy Is Also a Flower	Linda Benson
1968	A Case of Libel	Anita Corcoran
1970	The Love War	Sandy
1971	Thief	Jean Melville
1971	See the Man Run	Joanne Taylor
1973	The Norliss Tapes	Ellen Sterns Cort
1974	Pray for the Wildcats	Nancy McIlvain
1977	A Sensitive, Passionate Man	Marjorie 'Margie' Delaney
1978	Ringo	Sgt. Suzanne 'Pepper' Anderson
1978	Overboard	Lindy Garrison
1979	The Suicide's Wife	Diana Harrington
1981	Dial M for Murder	Margot Wendice
1982	One Shoe Makes It Murder	Fay Reid
1984	Jealousy	Georgia/Laura/Ginny
1984	A Touch of Scandal	Katherine Gilvey
1987	Stillwatch	Abigail Winslow
1987	Police Story: The Freeway Killings	Officer Anne Cavanaugh
1988	Once Upon a Texas Train	Maggie Hayes
1989	Fire and Rain	Beth Mancini
1989	Prime Target	Sgt. Kelly Mulcahaney
1991	Kojak: Fatal Flaw	Carolyn Payton
1992	Treacherous Crossing	Beverly Thomas
1996	Remembrance	Margaret Fullerton
1997	Deep Family Secrets	Rénee Chadway
1997	The Don's Analyst	Victoria Leoni
1999	Sealed with a Kiss	Lucille Ethridge
2009	Mending Fences	Ruth Hanson

=== Television series ===
Year	Title	Role	Notes
1954	I Led 3 Lives	Comrade Margaret	Episode: "Asylum"
1954	The Mickey Rooney Show	Receptionist	Episode: "The Executive"
1954	Death Valley Days	Salina Harris	3 episodes
1955	City Detective	Cigarette Girl	Episode: "The Perfect Disguise"
1955	Buffalo Bill, Jr.	Anna Louise Beaumont	Episode: "The Death of Johnny Ringo"
1955	Matinee Theatre	—N/a	7 episodes
1955	It's a Great Life	Myra	Episode: "The Raffle Ticket"
1956	General Electric Theater	Shaw	Episode: "Try to Remember"
1956	It's a Great Life	Rita Moore	Episode: "The Voice"
1956	The Life and Legend of Wyatt Earp	Ann Drew	Episode: "One of Jesse's Gang"
1956	Chevron Hall of Stars	Bertha	Episode: "Mr. Thompson"
1956	Four Star Playhouse	—N/a	Episode: "The Rites of Spring"
1956	The Millionaire	Jane Carr / Janice Corwin	Episode: "Millionaire Jane Carr"
1956	Schlitz Playhouse of Stars	Ann	Episode: "Always the Best Man"
1956	Broken Arrow	Terry Weaver	Episode: "The Conspirators"
1957	The Gray Ghost	Edie Page	Episode: "Point of Honor"
1957	Gunsmoke	Rose Daggitt (credited as Angie Dickson)	Episode: "Sins of the Father"
1957	Cheyenne	Jeannie	Episode: "War Party"
1957	Alcoa Theatre	Mrs. Garron	Episode: "Circumstantial"
1957	Have Gun – Will Travel	Amy Bender	Episode: "A Matter of Ethics"
1956–57	The Lineup	Doris Collins	3 episodes
1957	M Squad	Hazel McLean	Episode: "Diamond Hard"
1957	Meet McGraw	Mary Gaan	Episode: "Tycoon"
1957	Meet McGraw	Lisa Parish	Episode: "McGraw in Reno"
1958	The Restless Gun	Evelyn Niemack	Episode: "Imposter for a Day"
1958	Perry Mason	Marian Gallagher Fargo	Episode: "The Case of the One-Eyed Witness"
1958	The Bob Cummings Show	Milly	Episode: "Bob and Automation"
1958	Tombstone Territory	Dolores	Episode: "Geronimo"
1958	State Trooper	Betty Locke	Episode: "Wild Green Yonder"
1958	Colt .45	Laura Meadows	Episode: "The Deserters"
1958	Studio 57	—N/a	Episode: "Gambler's Luck"
1958	The People's Choice	Geraldine Gibson Hexley	2 episodes
1958	Mike Hammer	Lucille Hart	Episode: "Letter Edged in Blackmail"
1958	Mike Hammer	Rita Patten	Episode: "Look at the Old Man Go"
1958	Target	Betty Nelson	Episode: "Unreasonable Doubt"
1958	Northwest Passage	Rose Carver	Episode: "The Bound Women"
1958	Man with a Camera	Norma Delgado	Episode: "Closeup on Violence"
1959	Wagon Train	Clara Duncan	Episode: "The Clara Duncan Story"
1959	Men into Space	Mary McCauley	Episode: "Moon Probe"
1960	Lock-Up	Betty Nelson	Episode: "Sentenced to Die"
1962	Checkmate	Karen Vale	Episode: "Remembrance of Crimes Past"
1962	The Alfred Hitchcock Hour	Janet West	Season 1 Episode 5: "Captive Audience"
1962	The Dick Powell Show	Judy Maxwell	Episode: "No Strings Attached"
1964	The Fisher Family	Helen	Episode: "Bright Shadows"
1965	The Fugitive	Norma Sessions	Episode: "Brass Ring"
1965	The Man Who Bought Paradise	Ruth Paris	Unsold TV pilot
1965	The Alfred Hitchcock Hour	Ariane Shaw	Season 3 Episode 15: "Thanatos Palace Hotel"
1965	Dr. Kildare	Carol Tredman	3 episodes
1966	The Virginian	Annie Carlson	Episode: "Ride to Delphi"
1966	Bob Hope Presents the Chrysler Theatre	Christina	Episode: "And Baby Makes Five"
1971	The Man and the City	Charlene	Episode: "Running Scared"
1972	Ghost Story	Carol Finney	Episode: "Creatures of the Canyon"
1973	Hec Ramsey	Sarah Detweiler	Episode: "The Detroit Connection"
1974	Police Story	Lisa Beaumont	Episode: "The Gamble"
1974–78	Police Woman	Sgt. Suzanne 'Pepper' Anderson	91 episodes
1978	Pearl	Midge Forrest	3 episodes
1982	Cassie & Co.	Cassie Holland	13 episodes
1985	Hollywood Wives	Sadie LaSalle	TV miniseries, 3 episodes
1987	Saturday Night Live	Various – Guest host	
1991	Empty Nest	Jackie Sheridan	Episode: "Almost Like Being in Love"
1993	Wild Palms	Josie Ito	5 episodes
1993	Daddy Dearest	Mrs. Winters	Episode: "Mother Love"
1997	Diagnosis: Murder	Capt. Cynthia Pike	Episode: "Murder Blues"
1997	Ellen	Betsy	Episode: "G.I. Ellen"
1997	George & Leo	Sheila Smith	Episode: "The Witness"
1997	The Larry Sanders Show	Herself	Episode: "Artie and Angie and Hank and Hercules"
2004	Judging Amy	Evelyn Worth	Episode: "Catching It Early"
