= Shanley Caswell =

American actress

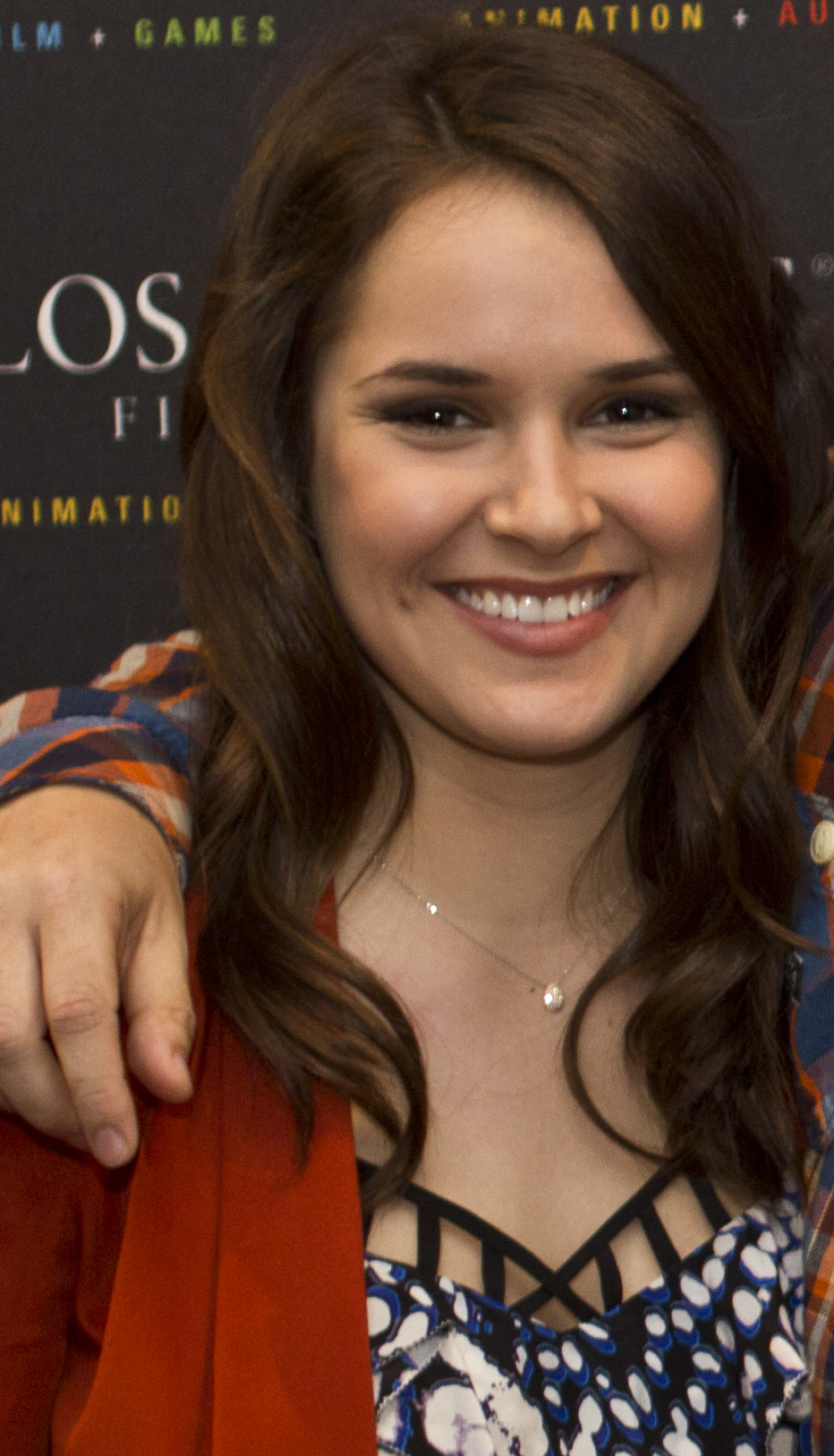
- Caswell at the screening of Detention at the LA Film School, April 2012
- Born: December 3, 1991 (age 34); Sarasota, Florida, U.S.
- Occupation: Actress
- Years active: 2007–present

Shanley Caswell (born December 3, 1991) is an American actress. She has guest starred in television series such as CSI: NY, Bones, iCarly and The Middle. She is best known for her starring roles in Detention (2011) as Riley Jones and as Andrea Perron in The Conjuring (2013). She recurred as Laurel Pride on NCIS: New Orleans from 2014 to 2021, spanning the series' seven seasons.

== Life and career ==
Shanley Caswell was born and raised in Sarasota, Florida. Shanley began acting in local theater at the age of eight. While in high school, she became involved with "Teen Source", a theater troupe whose focus is to educate the teenage community on social issues. She moved to Los Angeles to further her career in 2007, where she landed many guest-starring roles. Her first work was modelling at age 15. She also studied cultural anthropology at UCLA.

She made her feature film debut in Mending Fences, a television film for the Hallmark Channel and made her first major film role as one of the leads in the horror film Detention (2011), with her starring as Riley Jones. She appeared in horror film The Conjuring (2013), in the supporting role Andrea Perron, her second feature film, and starred as the lead role in the fairy tale update Snow White: A Deadly Summer (2012), released straight-to-video and streaming. In 2021, she featured as a main cast member in Power Book III: Raising Kanan (2021) as Shannon Burke.

== Filmography ==
=== Film ===
Year	Title	Role	Notes
2009	Little Victories	Katherine	Short film
2011	Detention	Riley Jones	
2012	Snow White: A Deadly Summer	Snow White	Direct to video
2012	Adrift	Mo	Short film
2013	Come Find Me	Jenny Sugar	Short film
2013	The Conjuring	Andrea Perron	
2013	Feels So Good	Brittany	
2017	Swiped	Erin	Short film
2017	Urban Myth: Nest	Karla	Short film
2018	Haunting on Fraternity Row	Claire	Direct to video

=== Television ===
Year	Title	Role	Notes
2008	Zoey 101	Audrey	Episode: "Coffee Cart Ban"
2009	Mending Fences	Kamilla Faraday	Television film
2010	iCarly	Tara	Episode: "iWas a Pageant Girl"
2010	Bones	Dede	Episode: "The Death of the Queen Bee"
2010	The Mentalist	Nadine Russo	Episode: "Red Sky At Night"
2011	The Middle	Samantha	2 episodes
2011	CSI: NY	Rachel Weber	Episode: "Crushed"
2012	Punk'd	Herself	Episode: "Lucy Hale"
2013	Vegas	Patricia	Episode: "Little Fish"
2014	Red Zone	Laney Weller	Television film
2014	High School Possession	Olivia Marks	Television film
2014–2021	NCIS: New Orleans	Laurel Pride	Recurring role, 14 episodes
2015	The Night Shift	Rachel Lawson	Episode: "Sunrise, Sunset"
2015	Scorpion	Dorie	Episode: "The Old College Try"
2017	Perfect Citizen	Vivian	Television film
2018	S.W.A.T.	Sarah	Episode: "The Tiffany Experience"
2019	The Resident	Nora Mitchell	Episode: "Stupid Things in the Name of Sex"
2019	E! True Hollywood Story	Herself	Episode: "Horror Movies: Cursed or Coincidence?"
2020	Kappa Kappa Die	Nina	CW Seed Halloween special
2021–2023	Power Book III: Raising Kanan	Shannon Burke	Main cast (seasons 1–2); Guest (season 3)
2024	Magnum P.I.	Amelia Reese	Episode: "The Big Squeeze"
