= Detention (2011 film) =

- Theatrical release poster
- Directed by: Joseph Kahn
- Written by: Joseph Kahn; Mark Palermo
- Produced by: Richard Weager; MaryAnn Tanedo
- Starring: Josh Hutcherson; Shanley Caswell; Spencer Locke; Dane Cook
- Cinematography: Christopher Probst
- Edited by: David Blackburn
- Music by: Brain and Melissa
- Production company: Detention Films
- Distributed by: Samuel Goldwyn Films
- Release dates: March 13, 2011 (SXSW); April 13, 2012 (United States)
- Running time: 93 minutes
- Country: United States
- Language: English
- Budget: $10 million

Detention is a 2011 American black comedy slasher film directed by Joseph Kahn, and co-written with Mark Palermo. The film premiered in March 2011 at SXSW in Austin, Texas. Detention stars Josh Hutcherson, Shanley Caswell, Spencer Locke (in her dual role), and Dane Cook.

== Plot ==
A serial killer known as Cinderhella is on the loose and preying on Grizzly Lake High's student body. Viewers are introduced to misfit students Riley, Ione, Toshiba, Mimi, and Clapton, as well as Sander who is infatuated with Riley. The school's principal, Verge, places them all in detention until 10 PM on the night of prom, certain that one of them is the killer. While in detention they discover that the school's stuffed bear mascot is actually a time machine and that the world is supposed to end in 1992 as a result of Ione's mother Sloane refusing to go to prom with Verge. It is also revealed that "Ione" is actually Sloane, who managed to swap bodies with her daughter and that the real Ione is in Sloane's body in 1992. Via her daughter's body Sloane stole Riley's crush Clapton, causing strife in their friendship.

They use the bear to time travel to 1992, where Ione tells them that she wants to remain in 1992, as she has become very popular due to knowing all of the trends. They also learn that Sander is the true killer and that Verge destroyed the world with his help. Although reluctant, Ione agrees to go to the prom with Verge, who agrees not to destroy the world. Riley also takes advantage of the time travel to keep her father from becoming an alcoholic.

After they return they discover that while the time travel did have some changes, the murders still occurred. Riley and Clapton, who had become a couple after the revelations of Ione/Sloan, are attacked by a jealous Sander. The three battle and Sander is killed after he is impaled on the bear mascot's fangs.

The film wraps up by showing that several of the students, two of which are Riley and Clapton, are now dating. Ione, who stayed in her mother's body, married Verge after she realized they were compatible and frequently grounds Sloan. The world is then invaded by plant based aliens, upset that humans have eaten and destroyed plants.

== Cast ==
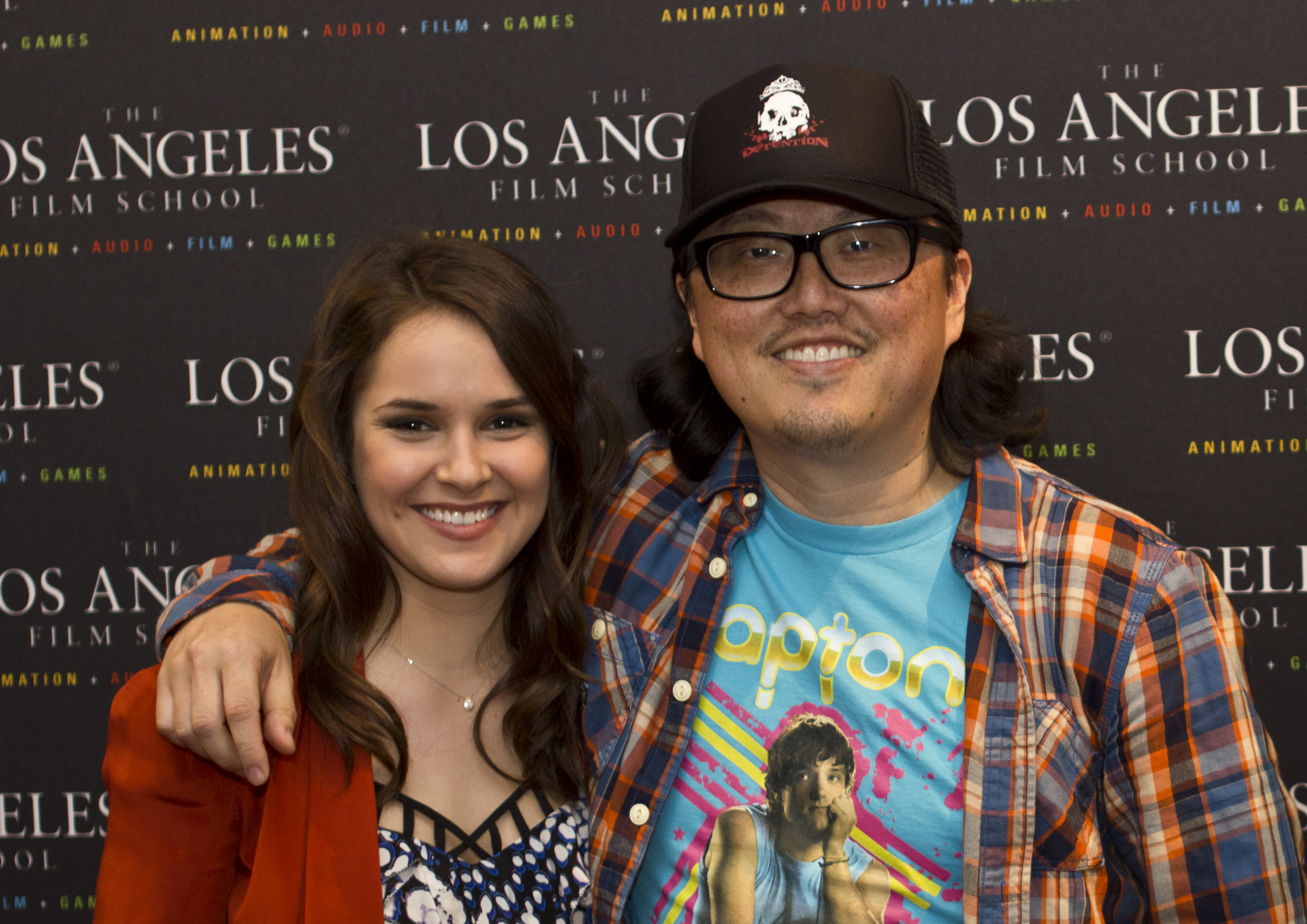
Director Joseph Kahn and actress Shanley Caswell at the screening of Detention at the LA Film School, April 2012

- Josh Hutcherson as Clapton Davis
- Shanley Caswell as Riley Jones
- Spencer Locke as Ione Foster / Sloan Foster
- Aaron David Johnson as Sander Sanderson
- Walter Perez as Elliot Fink
- Dane Cook as Principal Karl Verge
- Erica Shaffer as Sloan Foster
- Yves Bright as Mr. Kendall
- Parker Bagley as Billy Nolan
- Tiffany Boone as Mimi
- Alison Woods as Taylor Fisher
- Lindsey Morgan as Alexis Spencer
- Jonathan "Dumbfoundead" Park as Toshiba
- Travis "Organik" Fleetwood as Gord
- Marque Richardson as Toby T.
- Will Wallace as Doug Jones
- Ron Jeremy as Beauty Beast
- Richard Brake as Mr. Nolan
- Percy Daggs as Jock kid
- James Black as Coach Cooper

== Production ==
Financed largely by Joseph Kahn himself, principal photography began in Los Angeles in August 2010 and finished shooting October 2010. The Director of Photography, Christopher Probst, shot the film digitally on Red Ones. The production set visual effects supervisor is Chris Watts and post production visual effects supervision by Ingenuity Engine in Hollywood, California. Production design for the film was done by veteran music video and commercial designer Marcelle Gravel.

== Release ==
Sony Pictures Worldwide Acquisitions acquired this film's worldwide distribution rights. The film was released to select theaters in the United States on April 13, 2012, by Samuel Goldwyn Films, followed by a Canadian release on April 27.

The film was released via DVD and Blu-ray on July 31, 2012.

== Reception ==
=== Critical response ===
On Rotten Tomatoes, the film holds an approval rating of 44% based on 45 reviews, with a weighted average rating of 5.10/10 with the consensus stating, "Director Joseph Kahn's relentlessly kinetic style gives Detention a rebellious kick, but the overload of ideas keeps this genre mashup from ever cohering into a satisfying whole". On Metacritic, which assigns a normalized rating to reviews, the film has a weighted average score of 45 out of 100, based on 14 critics, indicating "mixed or average" reviews.

Justine Elias from Slant Magazine gave the film 3/4 stars, writing, "For gorehounds lured in by the poster and trailer, Detention will be disappointingly un-gorey. But for pop-culture pilgrims intent on discovering an underground prize, look no further." Brett Gallman from Oh, the Horror! gave the film a positive review, writing, "Smart, funny, and equally full of splatstick violence and heart, Detention isn't just next-level horror--it's next level everything, a senses-altering reaffirmation of cinema." R.L. Shafer from IGN called it "a shockingly meaningful, potent film about the nature of meaninglessness and its damning effects on the younger generation".

David Nusair from Reel Film Reviews awarded the film a mixed 2/4 stars, writing, "while Kahn deserves some credit for attempting something different within the teen-movie genre, Detention is simply (and finally) too weird and too off-the-wall to become anything more than a mildly amusing curiosity." Nicolas Rapold from The New York Times gave the film a negative review, writing, "Another entry in self-conscious one-upmanship, Detention is a horror comedy positively addled with retro references." Peter Hartlaub from The San Francisco Chronicle hated the film, "There will be young moviegoers who proclaim this genius, and more stodgy audience members who find it torturous. If you're not tweeting and texting a combined 50 times or more per day, you're probably in the latter camp."

=== Accolades ===
Detention won the Youth Jury Prize at the 2011 Seattle International Film Festival. The film also won the L'Écran Fantastique Prize 2011 at Montreal's Fantasia Film Festival as well as the Midnight Extreme Award at Spain's Sitges. London's Frightfest gave it the Biggest Surprise Award and organizer Alan Jones named Detention as his overall favorite film of the festival in 2011. Critic Devin Faraci called Detention "Insane, Hyperkinetic, Next Level Filmmaking." Drew McWeeny of Hitfix described it a "manic throwback horror comedy for the Twitter generation." Quint of Aint-It-Cool-News raved "time traveling teen pop culture comedy Detention is a runaway freight train of frenetic energy!" Renn Brown of CHUD said "Detention may very well be completely brilliant (5 of 5 stars)." Kevin Sommerfield from Slasher Studios also gave it a glowing review stating the film "is Scream meets Scott Pilgrim with a dash or two of Kaboom, it makes for one wild cocktail."
