= Daniel's Daughter =

- DVD cover
- Genre: Drama
- Written by: Tracy Rosen
- Directed by: Neill Fearnley
- Starring: Laura Leighton; Sebastian Spence
- Theme music composer: Ian Thomas
- Country of origin: Canada
- Original language: English

Production
- Executive producers: Gerald W. Abrams; Susan Murdoch
- Producer: David Till
- Cinematography: François Dagenais
- Editor: Ralph Brunjes
- Running time: 88 minutes
- Production company: QVF

Original release
- Network: Hallmark Channel
- Release: January 12, 2008

Daniel's Daughter is a 2008 Canadian television film directed by Neill Fearnley. The film is about a magazine editor who returns to her small hometown to fulfill a request from her estranged father.

== Plot ==
Starting in 1982 New Kerry, Massachusetts, young Cate Mandighan's mother Marie dies. Her father decides to send her to live with overseas relatives she has never met. Before leaving, her father promises her to one day look for her and asks her to write in her journal every day. Twenty six years later, Cate is a highly successful editor-in-chief of a popular lifestyle magazine in New York City, which helps women with problems. She is engaged to the older Stewart, a powerful media tycoon with two grown children. Their engagement is widely described in the media, and although they seem the perfect couple, Cate has trouble accepting his refusal to ever have children again.

One day, Cate receives a package from her father, who has recently died. In his letter, he expresses his regret for never having looked her up and requests her to scatter his ashes in New Kerry, with his friends Cavanaugh and Donahue, two Irish singers, in presence. She initially refuses to do as her father wishes, because she has always felt abandoned by him. She finally decides to head back to New Kerry, though, assisted by her personal assistant Jeffrey.

In New Kerry, Cate has trouble adjusting to small-town life, still maintaining her upper class lifestyle. She meets Connor Bailey, a man who makes her realize what she really wants in life. They fall in love, but Cate is reluctant to give in to her true feelings, remembering her proposal to Stewart. She decides to focus herself on her father's last request, which is troubled by Cavanaugh and Donahue's refusal to be in the same room together. She tries to help them reconcile their estranged friendship and while doing so, grows closer to Connor.

In the end, she scatters her father's ashes with Cavanaugh and Donahue in presence, and returns to New York City. She is swept by Connor's unexpected visit, who has followed her to admit that he is in love with her. As she is about to kiss him, she is caught by Stewart, who is not really upset with Cate's announcement that she does not want to spend the rest of her life with him. As he leaves, Cate and Connor are finally free to be with each other.

== Cast ==
- Laura Leighton as Catherine 'Cate' Madighan
- Sebastian Spence as Connor Bailey
- Ruth Marshall as Dr. Candice Keller
- Derek McGrath as Jim Cavanaugh
- Brandon Firla as Jeffrey Lerner
- Kelli Fox as Fiona
- Martin Doyle as Donahue
- Barry Flatman as Stewart
- Brad Borbridge as Craig Beamish
- Brendan Wall as Daniel Madighan
- McKenzi Scott as Marie Madighan
- Shae Norris as Young Cate
- Caprice Herjavec as Young Fiona
- Olivia Palenstein as Erin McManus
- London Angelis as Seamus
- Dorly Jean-Louis as Talisha
- Neill Fearnley as Judge

== Production ==
On October 1, 2007, it was announced Laura Leighton would star in a Hallmark Channel movie, Daniel's Daughter. By the time, production had already begun in Toronto. Filming took place entirely in Ontario.

== Reception ==
After its premiere, Daniel's Daughter ranked as the highest rated ad-supported cable movie of the week. A total of 4.1 million people viewed the premiere. The film boosted the channel to rank as the highest-rated cable network in Prime Time for the day. It also ranked #1 in the time period.

The film was received with mixed reviews, although most critics were more positive about this film than the general Hallmark Channel Original Movie. Variety wrote: 'Solid performances and scenic locations help bring a little heft to what's otherwise a pretty standard yarn about a woman whose idyllic life is shaken up by a long-deferred trip home to bury her father'. 'There's a breezy quality to the movie that goes down easily'. It sparked Leighton to do another Hallmark Channel Original Movie; Mending Fences (2009).

Daniel's Daughter is among the few Hallmark Channel films which received a DVD release.
