= Laura Leighton =

American actress (born 1968)

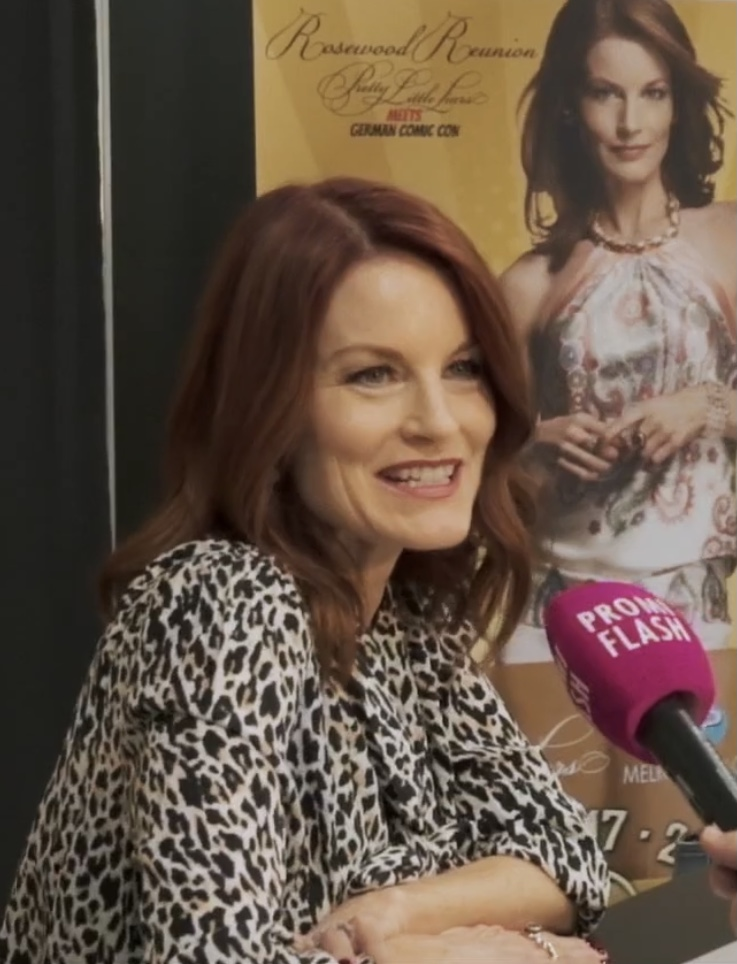
- Leighton at the 2019 German Comic Con Dortmund
- Born: Laura Diane Miller; July 24, 1968 (age 58)
- Occupation: Actress
- Years active: 1993–present
- Spouse: Doug Savant (m. 1998)
- Children: 2

Laura Leighton (born Laura Diane Miller; July 24, 1968) is an American actress. She is known for her roles as Sydney Andrews in the television series Melrose Place (1993–1997) and its continuation (2009–2010), and as Ashley Marin in the Freeform series Pretty Little Liars (2010–2017).

== Career ==
=== Beginnings and breakthrough with Melrose Place (1993–1999) ===
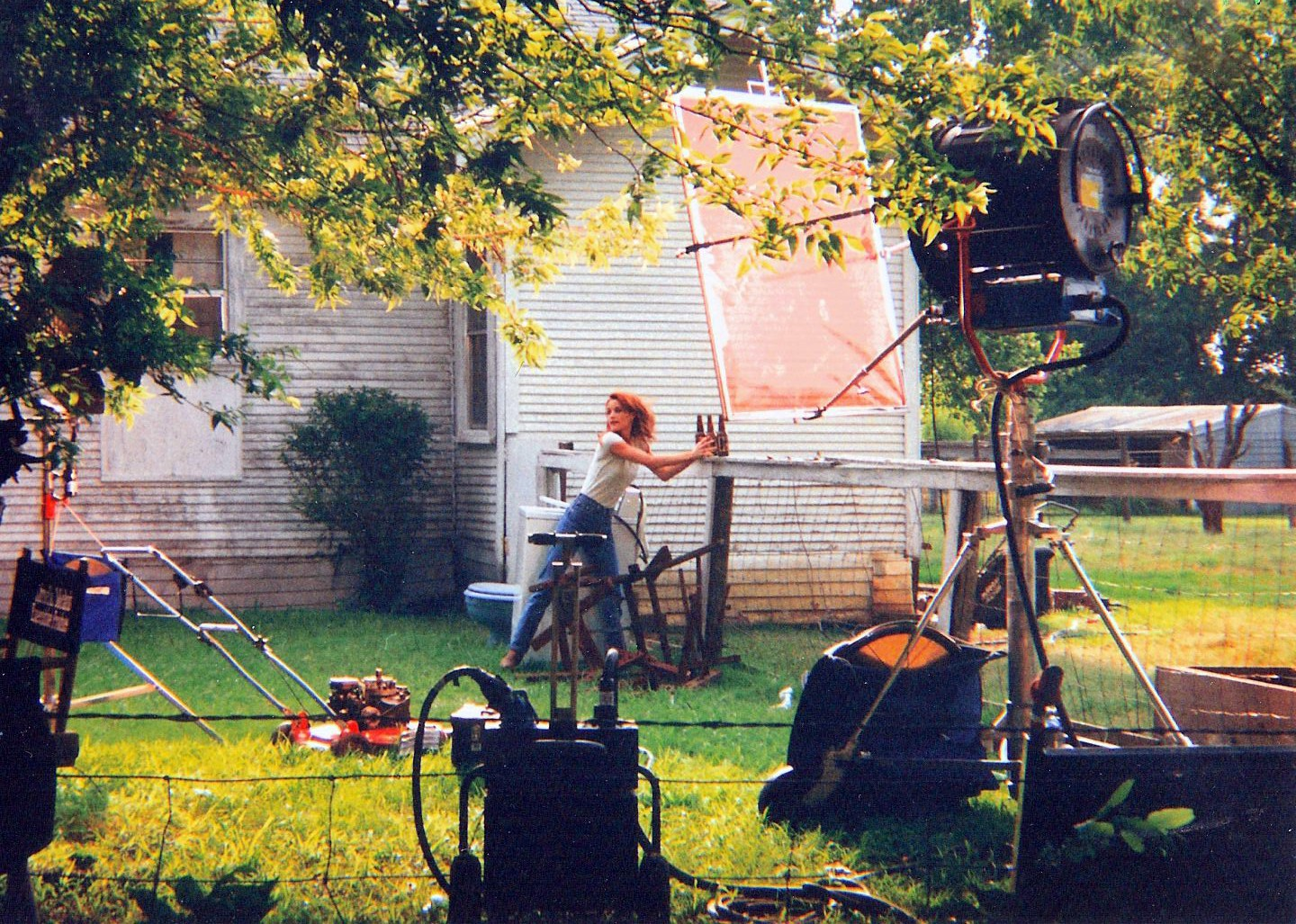
Laura Leighton shoots a scene for the film In the Name of Love: A Texas Tragedy.

In the early 1990s, Leighton's first on-screen jobs were in a commercial for Pizza Hut and Dep Hair Gel before taking her first major acting role as Sydney Andrews in the prime time soap opera Melrose Place. The part was originally intended for only two episodes in season 1, but was eventually developed into a full-time role for the subsequent seasons 2 to 5 (1993–1997). During the show's run, Leighton appeared on numerous magazine covers (including Entertainment Weekly and Rolling Stone and People). Leighton left the show at the end of the fifth season in 1997, which saw her character Sydney being struck and seemingly killed by a car, only moments after her wedding to Craig Field, played by David Charvet. The role earned her praise and a nomination for the Golden Globe Award for Best Supporting Actress – Series, Miniseries or Television Film

During breaks while filming Melrose Place, Leighton starred in the made-for-television films, In the Name of Love: A Texas Tragedy for FOX as Laurette Wilder, a woman from a poor background who falls for a rich man to the disgust of his grandparents, and The Other Woman for CBS as Carolyn Bryan, a newly married model who finds herself making friends with her husband's dying ex-wife. She also hosted an episode of Saturday Night Live in 1995 with musical guest Rancid.

After leaving Melrose Place in 1997 at the end of her contract, Leighton accepted a six-episode role on Beverly Hills, 90210. Aaron Spelling created the role of aspiring actress Sophie Burns for her, and she reportedly received a six-figure salary per episode. In 1999, she appeared in the independent short film Angels, Baby! directed by Jeff Fisher along with the Paul Lazarus-directed romantic comedy Seven Girlfriends opposite Tim Daly, and the thriller The Clean and Narrow opposite Jack Noseworthy which was released direct to video in early 2000.

=== Smaller roles in television and resurgence with Pretty Little Liars (2000–2017) ===
In the 2000s, Leighton guest-starred in the shows Cupid and The Outer Limits, and voiced a part in the animated series Duckman. She later starred in the indie film The Sky Is Falling with Dedee Pfeiffer and Eric Close before taking a break to have her son Jack Douglas. In 2003, she returned to the small screen in Skin for FOX, which was cancelled after three episodes, and in the short-lived 2005 ABC series Eyes.

From 2006–2007, after her FOX pilot Damages with Cole Hauser was not picked up, she made numerous prime-time guest appearances, on shows such as the ABC drama/comedy Boston Legal, Law & Order: Special Victims Unit, CSI: Miami, and Shark. In 2004, she starred in the Lifetime movies A Deadly Encounter as Joanne Sanders, a single mother who is the victim of a stalker, and Love Notes, as Nora Flannery, a classic music critic who, while on a job, finds love with a popular country and western singer. Leighton also appeared in the thriller The Burrowers directed by J.T Petty and the Hallmark Channel movies Daniel's Daughter opposite Sebastian Spence and Mending Fences, opposite Angie Dickinson.

On April 5, 2009, The Hollywood Reporter announced that Leighton would appear in the 2009 series Melrose Place, reprising her role as the presumed-dead Sydney Andrews, who would serve as landlord at Melrose Place. The remake only lasted a single season on The CW before being cancelled. On December 7, 2009, ABC Family announced that Leighton had been cast in a lead role in the TV series Pretty Little Liars, a TV adaptation of a book of the same name by Sara Shepard as Ashley Marin, the mother of Hanna Marin played by Ashley Benson, one of the four main characters on the show. Leighton stayed with Pretty Little Liars for all seven seasons until the show's end in June 2017.

=== After Pretty Little Liars (2018–present) ===
In 2018, Leighton guest starred on the CBS medical drama Code Black as Sonya Finn, and then starred in the Hallmark Christmas movie Christmas on Honeysuckle Lane. In 2020, she guest starred as Karen Scott on L.A.'s Finest, 2021 saw Leighton playing Corinne Simon in The CW's Dynasty. She appeared as Nettie in the episode "The Big Five Oh" of the Fantasy Island sequel series. In 2024, Leighton and her Melrose Place co-stars Courtney Thorne-Smith and Daphne Zuniga began hosting a podcast, Still The Place, on iHeartRadio.

== Public image ==
Following her performance in the second season of Melrose Place, Leighton was featured on the cover of Entertainment Weekly's 1994 Fall TV Preview issue. She appeared on the cover of Rolling Stone with her co-stars Heather Locklear and Josie Bissett in May 1994, in an issue entitled "Melrose Place's Bod Squad". In 1995, she was nominated for a Golden Globe Award for her work on the series, was named one of the most beautiful people in the world by People magazine, and hosted an episode of Saturday Night Live. The role of Sydney Andrews, which she signed on to reprise in the 2009 Melrose Place spin-off, has been recognized by The Hollywood Reporter as "one of the most popular characters" from the original series.

== Personal life ==
In 1988, Leighton assumed her mother’s maiden name.

In May 1998, Leighton married her Melrose Place co-star Doug Savant. They have two children together: Jack and Lucy.

== Filmography ==
=== Film ===
| Year | Title | Role | Notes |
|---|---|---|---|
| 1999 | Angels, Baby! | Jessica | Short |
| 1999 | Clean and Narrow | Marie | |
| 2000 | Seven Girlfriends | Anabeth | |
| 2000 | The Sky Is Falling | Amber Lee | |
| 2008 | The Burrowers | Gertrude | |

=== Television ===
| Year | Title | Role | Notes |
|---|---|---|---|
| 1993 | Victim of Love: The Shannon Mohr Story | Travel Agent | Television film; uncredited |
| 1993–1997 | Melrose Place | Sydney Andrews | Guest star (season 1); recurring role (season 2); main role (seasons 3–5) |
| 1994 | Life with Louie: A Christmas Surprise for Mrs. Stillman | N/A | Voice role; television short |
| 1995 | The Other Woman | Carolyn | Television film |
| 1995 | In the Name of Love: A Texas Tragedy | Laurette Wilder | Television film |
| 1995 | Saturday Night Live | Herself (host) | Host; episode: "Laura Leighton/Rancid" |
| 1997 | Duckman | Ditzi | Voice role; episode: "With Friends Like These" |
| 1997 | The Larry Sanders Show | Herself | Episode: "Artie and Angie and Hank and Hercules" |
| 1998 | Cupid | Kristy Holbrook | Unaired episode: "Botched Makeover" |
| 1998 | Beverly Hills, 90210 | Sophie Burns | Recurring role (season 9), 6 episodes |
| 1998 | Naked City: A Killer Christmas | Gerry Millar | Television film |
| 2000 | The Outer Limits | Anne Marie Reynolds | Episode: "Inner Child" |
| 2000 | Early Edition | Ginger | Episode: "Everybody Goes to Rick's" |
| 2002 | We'll Meet Again | Fran Sillman | Television film |
| 2003 | Skin | Cynthia Peterson | 6 episodes |
| 2004 | Tru Calling | Jordan Davies | Episode: "Daddy's Girl" |
| 2004 | A Deadly Encounter | Joanne Sanders | Television film |
| 2005 | Eyes | Leslie Town | Main role |
| 2006 | CSI: Miami | Alyssa Prince | Episode: "Silencer" |
| 2006 | Boston Legal | Erica Dolenz | Episodes: "Lincoln", "On the Ledge" |
| 2007 | Shark | Angela Corbin | Episode: "Backfire" |
| 2007 | Law & Order: Special Victims Unit | Lillian Rice | Episode: "Responsible" |
| 2007 | Love Notes | Nora Flannery | Television film |
| 2008 | Daniel's Daughter | Cate Madighan | Television film |
| 2009 | Mending Fences | Kelly Fariday | Television film |
| 2009–2010 | Melrose Place | Sydney Andrews | Recurring role, 7 episodes |
| 2010–2017 | Pretty Little Liars | Ashley Marin | Main role |
| 2018 | Code Black | Sonya Finn | Episode: "Change of Heart" |
| 2018 | Christmas on Honeysuckle Lane | Andie | Television film |
| 2020 | L.A.'s Finest | Karen Scott | Episode: "For Life" |
| 2021 | Dynasty | Corinne Simon | Episode: "Equal Justice for the Rich" |
| 2021 | Fantasy Island | Nettie | Episode: "The Big Five Oh" |

== Awards and nominations ==
| Year | Award | Category | Nominated work | Result |
|---|---|---|---|---|
| 1995 | Golden Globe Awards | Best Supporting Actress – Series, Miniseries or Television Film | Melrose Place | Nominated |
