= MaryAnn Tanedo =

American film and music video producer

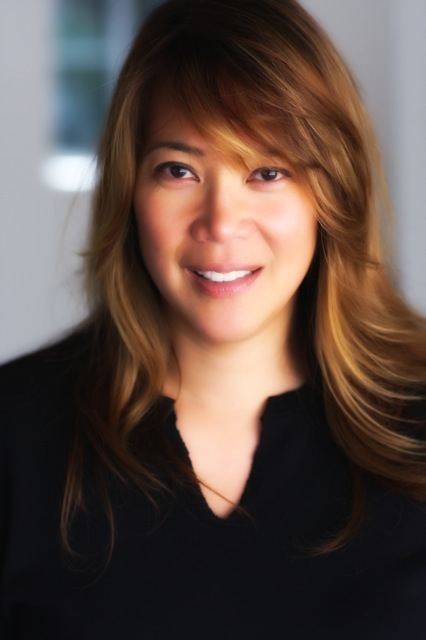
- Occupation(s): Film producer music video producer
- Years active: 1994–present
- Website: www.maryanntanedo.com

MaryAnn Tanedo is an American film and music video producer who began her career in the mid 1990s.

== Career ==
Tanedo’s early producing credits include the music video for Moby & Gwen Stefani’s "South Side" (2000) which won the 2001 MTV Video Music Award for Best Male Video, as well as the Grammy-nominated video for Jamiroquai's “Feels Just Like It Should” (2005), both directed by Joseph Kahn.

In 2010, she joined Simon Cowell and Joseph Kahn to produce a five-minute documentary music video for "Everybody Hurts", the charity single to raise money for the victims of the 2010 Haiti earthquake.

Her film producing credits include the 2011 horror/comedy feature Detention directed by Joseph Kahn and the 2014 drama Pony, written and directed by Candice Carella.

In 2017, Tanedo and Carella rejoined to produce the short film, Three Days in the Hole, the story of a young girl captured by ISIS and sold into slavery. The film was inspired by the true stories of Yezidi women who have suffered atrocities at the hands of ISIS.

In 2017, Tanedo produced 12 Round Gun, a boxing themed feature, written and directed by Sam Upton, starring Sam Upton, Jared Abrahamson, and Mark Boone Junior. In 2019, 12 Round Gun was added to the Netflix streaming catalog.

== Awards and nominations ==
In 2001, Tanedo was nominated for the Academy of Country Music's Video of the Year Award for Faith Hill's "The Way You Love Me", directed by Joseph Kahn.

In 2004, she was awarded a Latin Grammy for Best Music Video for Robi Rosa's "Más y Más" directed by Angela Alvarado.

At the 2009 MTV Video Music Awards, Tanedo won two Moonman awards- one for Best Hip-Hop Video for Eminem's "We Made You" and another for Best Pop Video for Britney Spears' "Womanizer", both directed by Joseph Kahn.

In 2011, Tanedo was nominated for a Grammy for Best Short Form Music Video for "Love the Way You Lie" by Eminem and Rihanna, directed by Joseph Kahn.

The 2014 short drama, Pony, produced by Tanedo, written and directed by Candice Carella, received the Award of Excellence at the 2016 Canada International Film Festival, a Gold Lion for Best Screenplay at the 2015 London Film Festival, and a Silver Award for Best Narrative Short at the 2015 International Independent Film Awards. Three Days in the Hole (2017) was nominated for awards at the Hollywood Film Festival and the Rome International Film festival. 12 Round Gun received the award for Best Drama Feature Film at the 2017 Mindfield Film Festival Los Angeles and Best Narrative Feature at the 2018 Cinema at the Edge Independent Film Festival.

== Filmography ==
- 12 Round Gun, written and directed by Sam Upton (2017)
- LA: CARS + MUSIC, directed by Van Alpert (2017)
- Three Days in the Hole, written by Candice Carella and Desmond Nakano, directed by Candice Carella (2017)
- Pony, written and directed by Candice Carella (2014)
- Detention, written by Joseph Kahn and Mark Palermo, directed by Joseph Kahn (2011)
- The Stone Cutter, written and directed by Stephen Erickson (2000)
