= Snow White: A Deadly Summer =

- DVD Cover
- Directed by: David DeCoteau
- Screenplay by: Barbara Kymlicka
- Produced by: David DeCoteau; John Schouweiler
- Starring: Shanley Caswell; Maureen McCormick; Eric Roberts
- Cinematography: David DeCoteau
- Edited by: Danny Draven
- Music by: Harry Manfredini
- Production companies: Hybrid; Rapid Heart Pictures
- Distributed by: Hybrid Presents; Lionsgate
- Release date: March 20, 2012
- Running time: 85 min
- Country: United States
- Language: English
- Budget: $1 million

Snow White: A Deadly Summer is a 2012 American horror film directed by David DeCoteau and starring Shanley Caswell, Maureen McCormick, and Eric Roberts. Inspired by the tale of the Brothers Grimm "Snow White", the film was released straight to DVD and digital download on March 20, 2012.

== Plot ==
Widower Grant (Eric Roberts) remarries to his new wife Eve (Maureen McCormick), who does not get along with his daughter Snow White (Shanley Caswell), as they see each other as competition for his attention.

Eve, who has a hidden agenda, discusses Snow's delinquent behavior with Grant, suggesting that they send Snow to a rehabilitation camp for juvenile delinquents. Snow overhears their conversation and walks off in anger, while informing Eve that Grant would never send her away. In response, Eve accuses Snow of attempting to sabotage her relationship with Grant, while adding that her "concern" for Snow brought them closer together as a couple.

After their confrontation, Eve has a conversation with her own reflection in her mirror (similar to the Evil Queen from the fairytale), who insists that sending Snow White away is the best plan to eliminate her. In her psychotic state, Eve takes her reflection's advice to get rid of Snow, with Eve's jealousy of Snow's bond with Grant as her motive. Later on, Snow is abducted by a pair of men and taken to the camp, while Eve flashes a fiendish smirk.

At the camp, the other juvenile delinquents are killed off one by one, and Snow has psychic dreams that show her the killings and give her clues into who the killer is and why they’re doing what they’re doing, and that the staff who run the camp seem to be hiding something (as the camp has a history of mysterious deaths).

It is later revealed that Eve herself is behind the killings. After killing Lyla (Eileen Dietz), who went to school with her, Eve sets her sights on Snow, all the while ranting that she was supportive of Grant following the passing of his first wife (Snow's mother). Eve also accuses Snow of being selfish and uncaring for what happened to her biological mother, and that with her gone, she and Grant could live happily ever after, only for Eve to end up dying in her attempt to kill Snow during their final battle.

In a plot twist, it is revealed that everything Snow had experienced had been a nightmare caused by a drug overdose. Regarding Eve, Grant reveals to Snow that Eve actually committed suicide by jumping off a building, doing so after being told that he wouldn't abandon Snow for her.

== Cast ==
- Shanley Caswell as Snow White
- Maureen McCormick as Eve
- Eric Roberts as Grant
- R.J Cantu as Bob
- Tim Abell as Hunter
- Chase Bennett as Cole
- Chelsea Rae Bernier as Lauren
- Camille Cregan as Mya
- Eileen Dietz as Lyla
- Aaron Jaeger as Sean
- Jason-Shane Scott as Mark
- Kelsey Weber as Sara
- Hunter Ansley Wryn as Erica
- Carolyn Purdy-Gordon as Dr. Beckerman
- Patrick Lewey as Jason

== Production ==
Maureen McCormick, who was in The Brady Bunch, had her first starring role after a long time. McCormick said that her only problem was having to pretend that she hated the main actress, Shanley Caswell. The film has Snow White in the title because the main character's name is Snow and her evil stepmother wants her dead.

== Home media ==
The DVD was released in widescreen with a Dolby 2.0 Stereo mix. The special features are a commentary with the director and two cast members, production photos, and the film's trailer.

== Reception ==
The film was critically panned, chief criticisms highlighting the incomprehensible plot with a cheap twist, bad acting, and cheap production values. In a Dread Central review, Foywonder writes: "The Snow White aspect seems more a gimmicky marketing ploy for what is really just a no-budget remake of that Mila Kunis movie Boot Camp (the one where she played a troubled teenager whose rich parents ship her off to an abusive rehabilitation camp for at-risk youth) crossbred with a PG-13 tweener slasher flick. The result is a barely competent barebones non-horror horror movie that is barely coherent and barely watchable." The review also criticized the title, writing that that the film could have been called Snow White and the Seven Delinquents or Snow White: A Deadly Dullness instead. Dawn Hunt of DVD Verdict panned the film and wrote that it fails most spectacularly on any expectations that viewers may have from Snow White being in the title.

== See also ==
- Grimm's Snow White, another 2012 film based on the tale of Snow White.
- Mirror Mirror, another 2012 film based on the tale of Snow White.
- Snow White and the Huntsman, another 2012 film based on the tale of Snow White.
- Blancanieves, a Spanish film also released on 2012 based on the tale of Snow White.
