= In the Name of Love: A Texas Tragedy =

- Genre: Drama; Romance; Thriller
- Written by: Danielle Hill
- Directed by: Bill D'Elia
- Starring: Laura Leighton; Michael Hayden; Richard Crenna; Bonnie Bartlett
- Country of origin: United States
- Original language: English

Production
- Executive producers: Art Harris; Gary Hoffman
- Producer: Chuck McLain
- Cinematography: James R. Bagdonas
- Running time: 96 minutes
- Production companies: Westgate Productions, Inc. Art Harris Productions; Gary Hoffman Productions, Inc. 20th Television; Columbia Pictures Television

Original release
- Network: FOX
- Release: September 12, 1995

In the Name of Love: A Texas Tragedy is a 1995 American film loosely based on the story of Ralph Hand III, and his ex-wife Olivia Browning. It aired September 12, 1995 on FOX.

== Plot ==
The story begins when Luke Constable III (Michael Hayden) and his fiancée Elaine Phelps (Neith Hunter) drive around on the way to see his rich farmer grandfather Mr. Constable (Richard Crenna) and Aunt Alice (Bonnie Bartlett) after going past Laurette Wilder (Laura Leighton), a poor woman from the wrong side of the tracks. Arriving at the ranch while Luke and Elaine talk with Herschel (Akin Babatunde) who is Luke's best friend, Luke finds out that after the deaths of both his parents, his grandfather and aunt Alice raise him. Later, while Laurette makes love with Billy Farber (Todd Terry), Luke and Elaine make love, and before they can drive home, Luke accidentally drives into a tree and is injured, causing Elaine to cry. Paramedics rush him to the hospital, leaving her to stay back.

After a car accident with his fiancée Elaine, Luke can no longer walk without the assistance of orthopedic canes. Because of his disability, a furious Elaine leaves him. Luke and Mr. Constable are having discussions, and Mr. Constable tells Luke that if they don't walk anymore, they break or they die just like Luke's dad died, and Luke says that it has to do with himself, not his dad. While at a barbecue at the home of his best friend Billy, Luke, now using crutches and wearing leg braces, then meets both Laurette and Pamela Jo Payton (Rebeccah Bush). While Billy and Pamela Jo make love, Luke begins his new relationship with Laurette and falls for her since he has been crippled in an automobile accident. And against the wishes of his grandfather, Luke brings Laurette with him to dinner and meets with Victoria Jennings (Alissa Alban), but because of Mr. Constable, Laurette feels miserable and Luke comforts her.

The next day begins, and Luke says to Laurette that he will want to marry her. The two say that Laurette was married to and divorced from a football player she met in school, and finally, Luke says to Laurette that he is the last man she horses around with. Laurette accepts the proposal to Luke and hooks up with him. Luke's grandfather arrives and gives Pamela Jo the money and tells her that Laurette must stay away from Luke, angering her. Laurette races out and confronts Mr. Constable by saying that she loves Luke and will want to marry him, however, Mr. Constable needs to keep Laurette from hurting him too much before the divorce because that's when Luke's and Laurette's marriage will end. Furious, Laurette picks up the money and she throws it at Mr. Constable before he drives away.

At Pamela Jo's house, she helps Laurette get ready and drives her to the wedding that Luke and Mr. Constable are in. At the wedding, Luke and Laurette marry and become husband and wife. At the hotel, the two arrive on their honeymoon. The next day arrives, and Luke and Laurette move into the back house. Laurette and Luke go swimming fully naked in the swimming pool in the middle of the night.

And on the next day, Aunt Alice arrives and visits with Laurette, who tells her that she plants the flowers outside gardening. Later that night, Laurette welcomes Luke home and wishes that they will split the land, but Luke declines, and Laurette goes out. The two arrive at a bar and meet with Terry Buffet (Travis Davis) and Cheeter (David Denney), and Luke and Laurette drive Cheeter home. Cheeter messes with Laurette, but Luke orders him out. Laurette and Luke argue over the things they never wanted to do. Laurette reminds Luke to be his own man and to stand up for her and himself to his grandfather.

Laurette visits with Luke and Herschel and tells Luke that he could take the day off, but Luke refuses, thanks to his grandfather. Laurette angrily tells Herschel that she is married to Luke and orders him not to turn her back on her, and she leaves, causing Luke to berate her. Mr. Constable angrily tells Luke about Laurette ruining the family who calls her a family whore. It happens when Laurette angrily packs her clothes and tells Luke to come with her, but Luke declines, and this land is part of him. Luke angrily tells Laurette to come back with him and to apologize to Herschel and to come around to get along with his family. Laurette furiously confronts Luke and reminds him to go back to his safe, stupid little life, while he tells her to go back to hell, and she says to him that hell is better than the lies.

Herschel arrives and visits with Laurette and reminds her to sign the divorce papers. Laurette signs the divorce papers and refuses to take the check, but Herschel hands to her the check. Luke tries to go back home but Herschel refuses him to go home because Laurette moves her things out. Laurette divorces Luke and drives away, while her ex-husband Luke looks at her exiting the back house. That makes Mr. Constable happy because Luke is now divorced.

Ten months later, Laurette meets with a man named Duane who asks her to go to the movies. She says to him that there is no movie for forty miles, and she also says to him that he also has a wife he was marrying. A landlady arrives, and Laurette tells her to take it out of her last month's rent that she will send to her. Unable to stay apart, Laurette now has a new car Luke was buying for her with the divorce settlement. And suddenly, Luke and Laurette, now ex-husband and ex-wife, continue to see each other secretly and reconcile until Laurette runs out of money she received from the divorce settlement provided by Luke's grandfather. Laurette tells Luke that she will need some money so she can find a new start in Dallas, and Luke tells her that he will not fund it because he doesn't want her in Dallas, but he expects her to stay with him. Luke tells his ex-wife Laurette that it will not be the same way, and it will be different. He tells her to come home with him to his house.

The next morning arrives, and Mr. Constable confronts both Luke and Laurette and reminds Laurette to get dressed and get out of the property, causing Luke to refuse him to talk mean to her. Mr. Constable gives to Luke an ultimatum: to either leave Laurette and stay with the family or stay with her and leave with nothing. Luke chooses to stay with Laurette and is told to leave with nothing, but tells him to go to hell for treating her like a bitch and a whore and a slut. Outside the motel, Luke tells Laurette to give the credit card to the motel manager (Rodger Boyce), and before Laurette and Luke are about to spend the night, they face him, and the credit card is not good and won't want them to stay. When thieves steal Luke's car, Laurette reminds Luke not to worry because she still has her car. Laurette and Luke drive off and pick up Pamela Jo. Luke, Laurette, and Pamela Jo all arrive at the house that Cheeter is in. Laurette and Luke are accepting to stay. Luke and Laurette are hoping to find a new life, but Luke is unable to get a job and becomes increasingly depressed.

Luke calls for Laurette and reminds her to put the sandwich down and line up the beer bottles he will later shoot with his gun. Laurette tells Luke that she can no longer stand by and watch him destroy himself and goes out for a night on the town alone. Luke calls Herschel on his cellular phone and reminds him to send him home. After being sent home by Herschel, Luke reunites with Mr. Constable and Aunt Alice and makes them happy and makes Laurette angry. Struggling in poverty, Luke contemplates murdering Mr. Constable, but he can't bring himself to do it. And upon her return, Laurette visits one final time with Cheeter, who tells her that Luke went home, causing Laurette to get mad at Luke. Laurette returns to Luke's house and finds him drunk and brandishing a gun. Luke threatens to shoot Laurette; she tells him to go ahead and kill her - he pulls the trigger, killing her with one shot. After Laurette dies, Luke somehow manages to get her body out of the house and to a remote location on his family's property. After placing Laurette's dead body on top of gathered branches and twigs, he lights it all on fire and watches Laurette's body burn. He momentarily considers killing himself, but is unable to do so and apologizes to Laurette for not being strong enough to do so. Later that night, Luke, sitting in his pickup, is surrounded and arrested for murder by law enforcement and police, while he tells his grandfather that he did not have the strength to die and that his dad had the strength to die. At Laurette's funeral, Pamela Jo and Billy arrive, saying goodbye to her while Pamela Jo reads from her diary the poem Laurette was writing before Laurette died, and Luke, now using a wheelchair, is imprisoned in jail.

== Cast ==
- Laura Leighton as Laurette Wilder
- Michael Hayden as Luke Constable
- Richard Crenna as Lucas Constable Sr.
- Bonnie Bartlett as Aunt Alice
- Rebeccah Bush as Pamela Jo Peyton
- Akin Babatunde as Herschel
- Todd Terry as Billy Farber
- David Denney as Cheeter
- Neith Hunter as Elaine Phelps
- Travis Davis as Terry Buffet
- Alissa Alban as Victoria Jennings
- Margaret Bowman as Landlady
- Rodger Boyce as Motel Manager
- Vince Davis as Photographer
- Todd Duffey as Davey Coombs

== Production ==
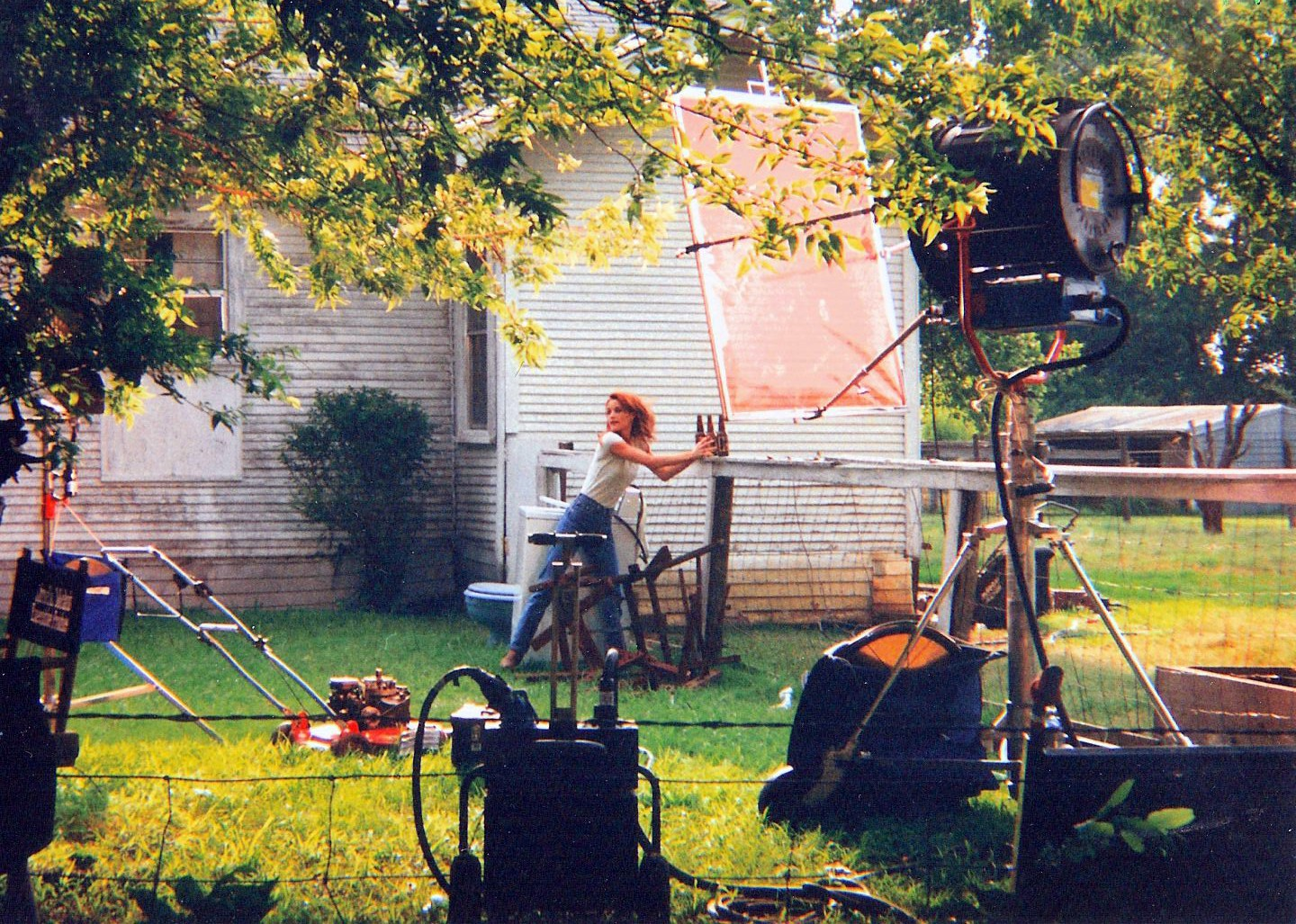

Principal photography began on June 7, 1995, and the film was shot entirely on-location in Denton, Aubrey, Pilot Point, Sanger, Bolivar, Lewisville, and Dallas, Texas. The film was shot in 19 days, during which time the visiting cast commuted around the area from a hotel in Denton.
