= Mending Fences =

- Genre: Drama
- Written by: Donald Martin; Mitchell Gabourie
- Directed by: Stephen Bridgewater
- Starring: Laura Leighton; Angie Dickinson; Shanley Caswell
- Theme music composer: Tom Strahle
- Country of origin: United States
- Original language: English

Production
- Producers: Kevin Bocarde; Kyle A. Clark; Stephen Niver
- Cinematography: Dane Peterson
- Running time: 120 minutes
- Production company: Larry Levinson Productions

Original release
- Network: Hallmark Channel
- Release: July 18, 2009

Mending Fences (working titles The View From Here and Prosper's Last Stand) is a television film premiered in Hallmark Channel on July 18, 2009. It stars Laura Leighton and Angie Dickinson (in her final film role).

== Plot ==
Kelly Faraday (Laura Leighton) is a television reporter who goes back to her hometown of Prosper, Nevada with her teenage daughter Kamilla (Shanley Caswell). Upon her arrival she finds that the town is in the middle of a drought. Kelly's mother Ruth (Angie Dickinson) must move forward from their estrangement to work together in stopping the casino developments which threaten the town's water supply.

== Cast ==
- Laura Leighton - Kelly Faraday
- Angie Dickinson - Ruth Hanson
- Shanley Caswell - Kamilla Faraday
- David Lee Smith - Walt Mitchell
- Ryan Kelley - Chuck Bentley
- Pat Crawford Brown - County Clerk
- Peter Jason - Hank Bentley
- Joel Murray - Sam Bridgewater
- Jeff Kober - Jack Norris Jr.

== Production ==
On November 18, 2008, it was announced Laura Leighton and Angie Dickinson were set to star in a Hallmark Channel Original Movie, The View From Here. For Leighton, it was her second Hallmark Channel Original Movie, the first being Daniel's Daughter (2008). She took the role because of the 'humanity' of the story.

== Reception ==
The film did well for the network on the night of its premiere, ranking as the second-highest-rated ad-supported cable movie of the week with a 1.8 household rating. It garnered over 2 million total viewers and 2.9 million unduplicated viewers.

The New York Times reviewed the film, saying,

This made-for-television movie is plodding and predictable, but Ms. Dickinson is anything but. At 78 she still has an odd and beguiling incongruity — a seductress with an enigmatic, ladylike reserve.

The focus remained on Dickinson's performance, as the review continued, "Even as a cranky, elderly rancher fighting off casino developers, she has feminine allure. There is no mystery to Mending Fences, but Ms. Dickinson adds a little mystique."

== Filming locations ==
Although the film takes place in Nevada, filming of the ranch took place in Thousand Oaks, California. Other filming took place in and around Santa Ynez, California.
