= Río Bravo (disambiguation) =

Río Bravo, or Río Bravo del Norte, is the name given in Mexico to the river known in the United States as the Rio Grande.

Río Bravo may also refer to:

- Kern River, California, original Spanish name, Rio Bravo de San Felipe
- Río Bravo, Tamaulipas, Mexico
- Río Bravo, Suchitepéquez, Guatemala
- Rio Bravo (former settlement), California, U.S. on the Kern River, later named Panama
- Rio Bravo, Texas, U.S.
- Rio Bravo, California, U.S., an unincorporated community
- Rio Bravo, a 1956 novel by Gordon D. Shirreffs
- Rio Bravo (film), a 1959 American western film
- Rio Bravo, a novelization of the 1959 film by Leigh Brackett
- Rio Bravo, a 2003 monograph by Robin Wood concerning the 1959 film; part of the BFI Film Classics line
- Rio Bravo Conservation and Management Area, a nature reserve in Belize
- Rio Bravo Cantina, a defunct American Tex-Mex restaurant chain
- Rio Bravo, a tributary of the Hondo River in Belize, also known as Chan Chich
