= Charlie Brown and Franz Stigler incident =

World War II air incident

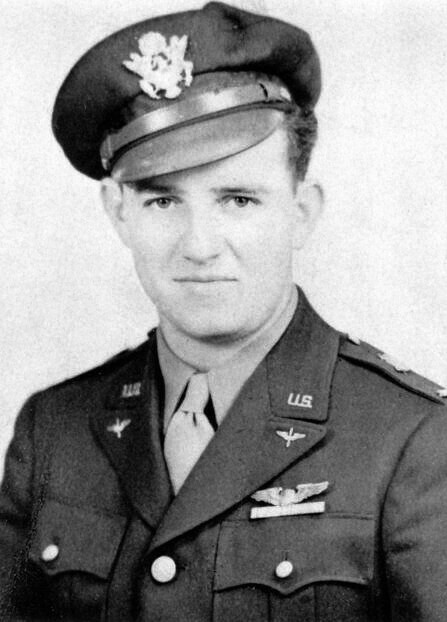
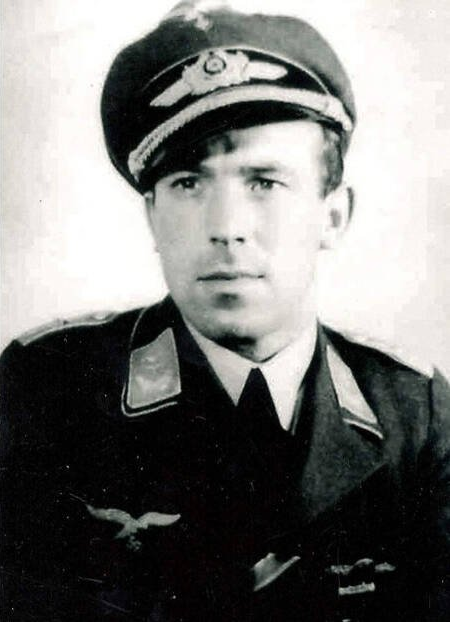
- Charlie Brown (left) and Franz Stigler (right)

Air combat
- Date: 20 December 1943
- Summary: Fighter pursuit of bomber; enemy fighter escorts bomber to safety
- Site: Over Germany and German-occupied Europe

First aircraft
- Type: Boeing B-17F Flying Fortress
- Operator: United States Army Air Forces (USAAF)
- Registration: 42-3167
- Flight origin: RAF Kimbolton
- Destination: Bremen, Germany, then return
- Crew: 10
- Fatalities: 1 (tail gunner)
- Survivors: 9

Second aircraft
- Type: Messerschmitt Bf 109G-6
- Operator: Luftwaffe
- Crew: 1
- Survivors: 1

The Charlie Brown and Franz Stigler incident is said to have occurred when, on 20 December 1943, after a successful bomb run on Bremen, 2nd Lt. Charles "Charlie" Brown's B-17F Flying Fortress Ye Olde Pub of the United States Army Air Forces (USAAF) was severely damaged by German fighters, and had fallen out of formation, left behind by other bombers with only a few engines running. Luftwaffe pilot Franz Stigler was on the ground when Brown's aircraft flew low nearby his airfield. When there is no doubt that the B-17 Ye Olde Pub encountered a Me 109 whose pilot saluted before departing (numerous witnessess and supporting documents), Stigler's version stand only on Stigler' words, since no evidence was provided by Stigler; Moreover, the written archives, both German and US, contradict Stigler's version. As reported by Stigler, he saw this as an opportunity to score the last kill of a bomber kill award, although this is not consistent with the Luftwaffe current standards for Knight’s Cross award: Indeed Stigler had at that time 22 victories, i.e 27 points for the award, when 30 points were needed, as told by Stigler ; But in fact, it was 50 points (50 victories) that were needed for the famous HJ Marseille one year earlier, and 69 points (for 44 victories) that were necessary for his friend Willy Kientsch, one month earlier. Another inconsistency regarding this award, is the fact that having hidden the B-17 sparing to his hierarchy, Stigler reported the destruction of this B-17, which should have credited Stigler with the “last missing victory” allowing him to receive the award…

When Stigler intercepted the bomber, he had the opportunity to shoot down the crippled bomber but did not do so, and instead escorted it over and past German-occupied territory so as to protect it. The American bomber aimed the roof mounted turret at Stigler under Brown's request, but did not open fire as Stigler descended. When they left occupied coasts, the German pilot saluted Brown from the left side of the aircraft and flew back home. After an extensive search by Brown, Stigler answered to Brown and said it was him the 109's pilot; The two pilots met each other 50 years later and developed a friendship that lasted until Stigler's death in March 2008. Brown died 8 months later, in November of the same year.

== Pilots ==
Charles Lester Brown (24 October 1922 – 24 November 2008) was a B-17 pilot with the 527th Bombardment Squadron of the 379th Bombardment Group within the USAAF's VIII Bomber Command, stationed at RAF Kimbolton in England. Brown was from Weston, West Virginia.

Franz Stigler (21 August 1915 – 22 March 2008) was a veteran Luftwaffe fighter pilot attached to Jagdgeschwader 27. Stigler was from Regensburg, Bavaria.

Stigler hold a bad reputation within the Luftwaffe, being previously a member of the "JG 27 Infamous Schwarm" that made numerous false claims reports, as detailed in his biography.

At the time of their incident, Brown was 21 and Stigler was 28.

== Bremen mission ==
The mission of 20 December 1943 was the Ye Olde Pub crew's first and targeted the Focke-Wulf 190 aircraft production facility in Bremen. The men of the 527th BS were informed in a pre-mission briefing that they might encounter hundreds of German fighters. Bremen was guarded by more than 250 flak guns. Brown's crew was assigned to fly "Purple Heart Corner," a spot on the edge of the bomber formation that was considered especially dangerous because the Germans often targeted the more vulnerable edges, instead of attacking straight through the middle of the formation. However, since three bombers had to turn back because of mechanical problems, Brown was told to move his plane up to the front of the formation.

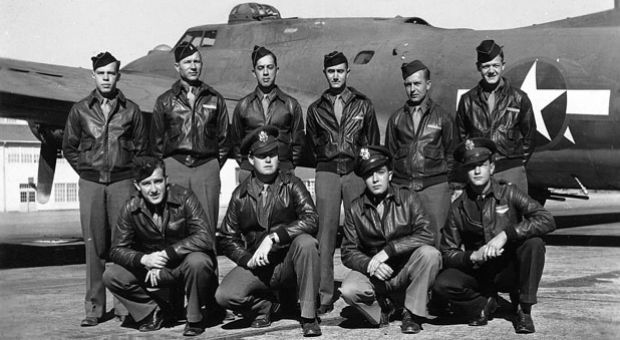
Crew of Ye Olde Pub. Standing (l to r): Coulombe, Yelesanko, Pechout, Jennings, Eckenrode, and Blackford. Kneeling (l to r): Brown, Luke, Sadok, and Andrews.

For this mission, the crew of Ye Olde Pub (B-17F serial number 42-3167) consisted of:

- 2nd Lt. Charles L. "Charlie" Brown (24 October 1922 – 24 November 2008): pilot / aircraft commander
- 2nd Lt. Spencer G. "Pinky" Luke (22 November 1920 – 2 April 1985): co-pilot
- 2nd Lt. Albert A. "Doc" Sadok (23 August 1921 – 10 March 2010): navigator
- 2nd Lt. Robert M. "Andy" Andrews (14 January 1921 – 23 February 1996): radio operator & bombardier
- Sgt. Bertrand O. "Frenchy" Coulombe (1 March 1924 – 25 March 2006): top turret gunner and flight engineer
- Sgt. Richard A. "Dick" Pechout (14 September 1924 – 5 January 2013): radio operator
- Sgt. Hugh S. "Ecky" Eckenrode (9 August 1920 – 20 December 1943): tail gunner
- Sgt. Lloyd H. Jennings (22 February 1922 – 3 October 2016): left waist gunner
- Sgt. Alex "Russian" Yelesanko (31 January 1914 – 25 May 1980): right waist gunner
- Sgt. Samuel W. "Blackie" Blackford (26 October 1923 – 16 June 2001): ball turret gunner

=== Bomb run ===
Brown's B-17 began its ten-minute bomb run at 8,320 m (27,300 ft) with an outside air temperature of −60 °C (−76 °F). Before the bomber released its bomb load, flak shattered the Plexiglas nose, knocked out the #2 engine and further damaged the #4 engine, which was already in questionable condition and had to be throttled back to prevent overspeeding. As the damage slowed the bomber, Brown was unable to remain with his formation and fell back as a straggler, a position in which he came under sustained enemy attacks.

=== Fighter attacks ===
Brown's struggling B-17 was now attacked by over a dozen enemy fighters (a combination of Messerschmitt Bf 109s and Focke-Wulf Fw 190s) of JG 11 for more than ten minutes. Further damage was sustained, including to the #3 engine, reducing it to only half power (meaning the aircraft had effectively, at best, 40% of its total rated power available). The bomber's internal oxygen, hydraulic, and electrical systems were also damaged, and the bomber had lost half of its rudder and port (left side) elevator, as well as its nose cone. Several of the gunners' weapons had jammed, most likely as a result of the loss of on-board systems, leading to frozen firing mechanisms. This left the bomber with only two dorsal turret guns plus one of the three forward-firing nose guns (from 11 available) for defense. Many of the crew were wounded: the tail gunner, Eckenrode, had been decapitated by a direct hit from a cannon shell, while Yelesanko was critically wounded in the leg by shrapnel, Blackford's feet were frozen due to shorted-out heating wires in his uniform, Pechout had been hit in the eye by a cannon shell and Brown was wounded in his right shoulder. The morphine syrettes carried onboard had also frozen, complicating first-aid efforts by the crew, while the radio was destroyed and the bomber's exterior heavily damaged. Miraculously, all but Eckenrode survived. The crew discussed the possibility of bailing out of the aircraft, but realized Yelesanko would be unable to make a safe landing with his injury. Unwilling to leave him behind in the plane, they flew on.

=== Franz Stigler ===
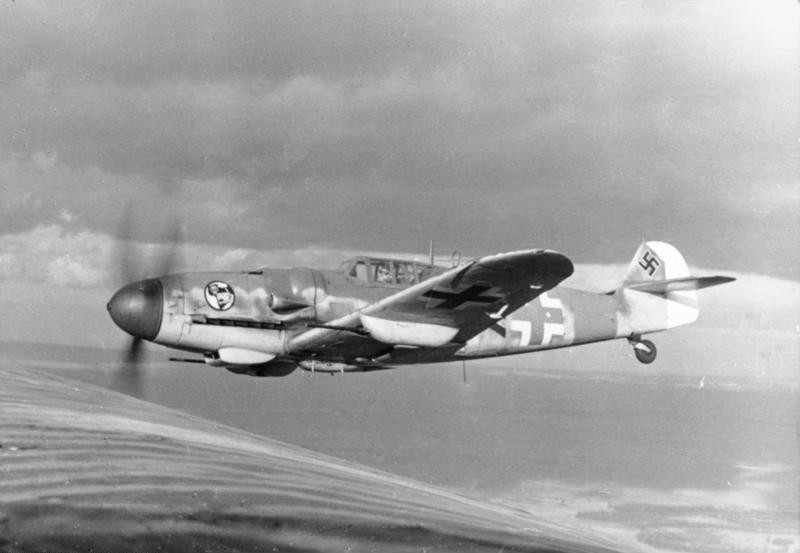
A Bf 109G-6 of JG 27

As reported by Stigler, Brown's damaged, straggling bomber was spotted by Germans on the ground, including Franz Stigler (then an ace with 22 victories), who was refueling and rearming at an airfield. He soon took off in his Messerschmitt Bf 109 G-6 (which had an American .50 BMG bullet embedded in its radiator, risking the engine overheating) and quickly caught up with Brown's plane. Through openings torn in the damaged bomber's airframe by flak and machine gun fire, Stigler was able to see the injured and incapacitated crew. To the American pilot's surprise, the German did not open fire on the crippled bomber. Stigler instead recalled the words of one of his commanding officers from JG 27, Gustav Rödel, during his time fighting in North Africa: "If I ever see or hear of you shooting at a man in a parachute, I will shoot you myself." Stigler later commented, "To me, it was just like they were in a parachute. I saw them, and I couldn't shoot them down."

Twice Stigler tried to persuade Brown to land his plane at a German airfield and surrender, or divert to nearby neutral Sweden, where he and his crew would receive medical treatment and be interned for the remainder of the war. However Brown and the crew of the B-17 did not understand what Stigler was trying to mouth and gesture to them, and so flew on. Stigler later told Brown he was trying to get them to fly to Sweden. He then flew near Brown's plane in close formation on the bomber's port side wing, so that German anti-aircraft units would not target it, and escorted the damaged B-17 across the coast until they reached open water. Brown, still unsure of Stigler's intentions, ordered his dorsal turret gunner to target his guns on Stigler but not open fire, to warn him off. Understanding the message and certain that the bomber was finally out of German airspace, Stigler departed with a salute.

However, Stigler's version is not consistent with Brown version, published on December 1989 in Jägerblatt magazine, who spoke about an encounter of 1 to 2 minutes only; Indeed, the distance (and description of further actions) given by Stigler, from Jever to the sea, represents around 120 to 150 km, means around a 20 minutes ride. The presence of Stigler, the "mercy act" and the escort to protect the B-17 from the Flak, are therefore questionnable.

=== Landing ===
Brown managed to fly the 250 mi (400 km) across the North Sea and land his plane at RAF Seething, home of the 448th Bomb Group and at the postflight debriefing informed his officers about how a German fighter pilot had let him go.

Brown went on to complete a combat tour. Stigler later served as a Messerschmitt Me 262 jet-fighter pilot in Jagdverband 44 until the end of the war. Ye Olde Pub did not return to combat; it was returned to the U.S. in April 1944 and was scrapped in August 1945.

== Postwar ==
After the war, Brown returned home to West Virginia and went to college, returning to the newly established U.S. Air Force in 1949 and serving until 1965. Later, as a U.S. State Department Foreign Service Officer, he made numerous trips to Laos and Vietnam. In 1972, he retired from government service and moved to Miami, Florida, to become an inventor.

Stigler moved to Canada in 1953 and became a successful businessman.

=== Meeting of pilots ===
In 1986, the retired Lt. Col. Brown was asked to speak at a combat pilot reunion event called a "Gathering of the Eagles" at the Air Command and Staff College at Maxwell Air Force Base, Alabama. Someone asked him if he had any memorable missions during World War II; he thought for a minute and recalled the story of the Bf 109 encounter and pilot's salute. Afterwards, Brown decided he should try to find the unknown German pilot.

After four years of searching vainly for U.S. Army Air Forces, U.S. Air Force and West German air force records that might shed some light on who the other pilot was, Brown had come up with little. He then wrote a letter to a combat pilot association newsletter Jägerblatt. A few months later he received a letter from Stigler, who was now living in Canada. "I was the one," it said. When they spoke on the phone, Stigler described his plane, the encounter and salute, confirming everything that Brown needed to hear to know he was the German fighter pilot involved in the incident. It has to be noted that all those details were previously provided by Brown in Jägerblatt magazine, which was easy to learn and repeat. But Stigler informed Brown he could have fired at Brown’s B-17 many times during the long escort he made in order to protect the B-17 from the Flak, but did not do so, as he wanted to spare the crippled plane. This of course reinforced Brown’s esteem and gratefulness to Stigler, and Brown did not crosscheck further. However, it has to be noted that none of the B-17 crew found time to identify the personal marking of the Me 109, which is understandable during a quick encounter as described by Brown, but not in case of a “20 minutes escort” as described by Stigler, reinforcing the version of a simple encounter of Ye Olde Pub B-17 with a Me 109 out of ammo, whose pilot saluted the crippled B-17 and departed immediately, as mentionned by Brown in the conclusion of his initial report, without any "act of mercy" nor long escort.

Between 1990 and 2008, Charlie Brown and Franz Stigler became close friends and remained so until their deaths within several months of each other in 2008.

=== Legacy ===
In 1993, Stigler was presented with the "Star of Peace" by the Combatants Federation of Europe.

In 2008, following a request from pilot Brown, crew members of the B-17 were each awarded the Silver Star; Brown himself was awarded the Air Force Cross.

The incident was the subject of a biographical novel by Adam Makos, A Higher Call, released in 2012.

The incident appears to have inspired one plot line of the seventh episode of the 11th season of the American police procedural drama NCIS, entitled "Better Angels", which first aired in November 2013.

For their 2014 Heroes album, Swedish heavy metal band Sabaton wrote a song about the incident titled "No Bullets Fly".

In January 2019, a surviving B-17 (serial number 44-8543) operated by Erickson Aircraft Collection of Madras, Oregon, was repainted as Ye Olde Pub. The plane is flown in airshows and to provide historic flight experiences.

Lloyd Jennings, a waist gunner on the B-17, was the last surviving crew member of the incident; he died in 2016.

== Sources ==
- Makos, Adam; Alexander, Larry (2012). A Higher Call: An Incredible True Story of Combat and Chivalry in the War-Torn Skies of World War II (1st ed.). New York: Berkley Caliber. ISBN 978-0-425-25286-4.
