= A Higher Call =

Book about WWII combat incident

- Author: Adam Makos; Larry Alexander
- Language: English
- Genre: History
- Publisher: Berkley Books
- Publication date: 2012
- Publication place: United States
- Pages: 400
- ISBN: 978-0-425-25286-4

A Higher Call is a 2012 non-fiction book by Adam Makos with Larry Alexander, published by Berkley Books. It recounts the story of the Charlie Brown and Franz Stigler incident of 1943, which took place in the skies of Germany during the Second World War. In it, Franz Stigler, a German Luftwaffe fighter ace flying a Messerschmitt Bf 109, guided a severely damaged American Boeing B-17 Flying Fortress out of German airspace after failing to persuade it to surrender, an act of chivalry.

The work is based on interviews with Stigler and Brown more than 50 years after the incident.

== Publication ==
A Higher Call: An Incredible True Story of Combat and Chivalry in the War-Torn Skies of World War II was written by military historian Adam Makos with military writer Larry Alexander and published in 2012 by Berkley Books. It has 400 pages, and includes photographs, notes and a bibliography. There is no index.

== Background ==
Makos is editor of a military history magazine, Valor. He writes regularly about the Second World War and as in the book, he relates some of his work to his own life changing experiences. He describes the book title as "one man's humanity over his nationality".

== Summary ==
A Higher Call is a story about chivalry; it tells the story about Franz Stigler, a German fighter ace of the Luftwaffe pilot who flew a Messerschmitt Bf 109, and Charlie Brown, a 21-year-old American pilot of a Boeing B-17 Flying Fortress named 'Ye Olde Pub'. On 20 December 1943, following a bombing mission over Germany, the severely damaged American aircraft was approached by Stigler whilst attempting to fly to England from Berlin. Stigler's duty was to destroy the American aircraft, but after seeing the wounded crew, instead flew in formation and guided it away from Germany after failing to persuade it to surrender. The book begins with Makos's account of his own experiences, research and how he interviewed the two veterans more than 50 years after the incident and after they had reunited in the 1980s. In his experience this is one of several similar stories. He explains in the first chapter that before meeting Brown, he would never have interviewed or written about a German fighter pilot. It is followed by the story of Stigler's early life, training in flying and Stigler's account of post-war Germany. It also covers how Stigler went from surveying flight routes for Luft Hansa to training pilots for the Luftwaffe, including his brother August, who experienced a fatal crash.

How Stigler and Brown later reunited is discussed near the end of the book.

== Reception ==
In 2013, Higher Call featured on The New York Times Best Seller list. In 2014, the book appeared on Chief of Staff of the United States Air Force Mark Welsh's recommended reading list. A review appeared in The Times of London.

In a review in Air Power History, the book is noted to give an understanding of doing the right thing "especially when no-one is watching".
