= Once a Crook =

Once a Crook may refer to:

- Once a Crook (film), a 1941 British crime film
- Once a Crook (NCIS), an episode of the TV series NCIS
