= Larry Alexander =

Larry or Lawrence Alexander may refer to:

- Larry Alexander (journalist) (born 1951), American journalist and military historian
- Larry Alexander (politician) (1950–2012), American politician
- Larry D. Alexander (born 1953), American artist, Christian author and teacher
- Larry Alexander (comics), see Straw Man (comics)
- Lawrence Alexander (basketball) (born 1991), American basketball player
- Lawrence A. Alexander (born 1943), American law professor
