= Charlie Brown (pilot) =

American WWII pilot (1922–2008)

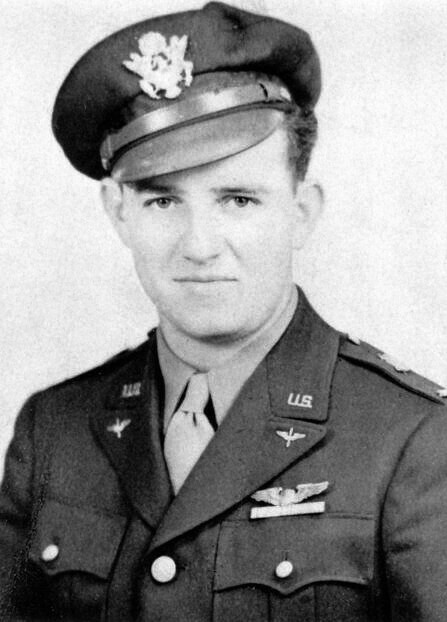
- Charlie Brown (c. 1940s)
- Born: Charles Lester Brown; October 24, 1922; Weston, West Virginia, U.S.
- Died: November 24, 2008 (aged 86); Miami, Florida, U.S.
- Burial place: Woodlawn Park Cemetery South; Miami, Florida, U.S.
- Spouse: Jackie Brown
- Children: 2 daughters
- Military career
- Allegiance: United States
- Branch: United States Army (1939-42); United States Army Air Force (1942-47); United States Air Force (1947-65); United States Department of State (1965-72)
- Service years: 1939–1972
- Rank: Lieutenant Colonel
- Nickname: 'Charlie'
- Units: 527th Bomb Squadron, 379th Bomb Group
- Known for: Charlie Brown and Franz Stigler incident
- Conflicts: World War II
- Awards: Air Force Cross; Distinguished Flying Cross; Purple Heart; Air Medal (4)

Charles Lester Brown (October 24, 1922 – November 24, 2008) was a USAAF pilot during World War II. He became well known for being the pilot of the B-17F Flying Fortress named Ye Olde Pub which was involved in the Charlie Brown and Franz Stigler incident.

== Early life ==
Born on October 24, 1922, in Weston, West Virginia as the youngest of six children to a family of farmers, Charlie was interested in flying planes from an early age. In 1939, he enlisted in the U.S. Army. After the attack on Pearl Harbor, he would join the United States Army Air Forces in 1942.

== Military service ==
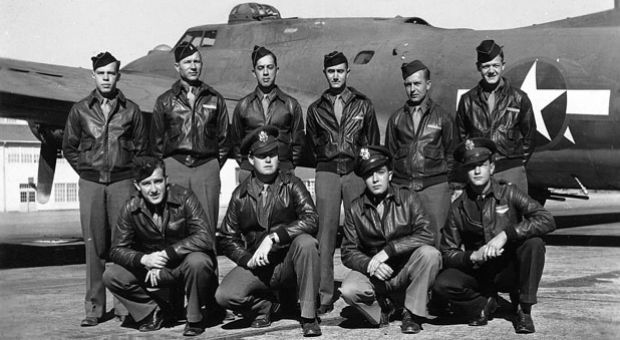
Group picture of the Ye Olde Pub crew (Brown is kneeling on the far left)

After completing flight training and becoming a pilot, Brown was assigned to the 527th Bomb Squadron of the 379th Bomb Group. On 20 December 1943, at the age of 21, he was sent on his first mission when he flew the Ye Olde Pub over Bremen, Germany. Although the bombing mission of a Fw 190 Factory was considered successful, the Ye Olde Pub had sustained damage to two of its engines during the bombing run, leaving it unable to keep up with the bomber formation and the protection it provided. After various attacks from Bf 109s and Fw 190s, the Ye Olde Pub was left without oxygen, working hydraulics, and electrical systems. Another engine had also suffered damage and failed, and the tail gunner had been killed. Brown lost consciousness due to lack of oxygen, and when he regained consciousness, the bomber was at an extremely low attitude of 1,000 meters. Brown rejected bailing out as an option due to some of the crew members being wounded and unable to bail out, and they continued to fly back to their home base, RAF Kimbolton.

Brown's damaged, straggling bomber was spotted by Germans on the ground, including Franz Stigler (then an ace with 27 victories), who was refueling and rearming at an airfield. He soon took off in his Messerschmitt Bf 109 G-6 (which had an American .50 BMG bullet embedded in its radiator, risking the engine overheating) and quickly caught up with Brown's plane. Through openings torn in the damaged bomber's airframe by flak and machine gun fire, Stigler was able to see the injured and incapacitated crew. Brown noticed the Bf 109 to his right. To the American pilot's surprise, the German did not open fire on the crippled bomber. Stigler instead recalled the words of one of his commanding officers from JG 27, Gustav Rödel, during his time fighting in North Africa: "If I ever see or hear of you shooting at a man in a parachute, I will shoot you myself." Stigler later commented, "To me, it was just like they were in a parachute. I saw them and I couldn't shoot them down."

Twice Stigler tried to persuade Brown to land his plane at a German airfield and surrender, or divert to nearby neutral Sweden, where he and his crew would receive medical treatment and be interned for the remainder of the war. However Brown and the crew of the B-17 did not understand what Stigler was trying to mouth and gesture to them, and so flew on. Stigler later told Brown he was trying to get them to fly to Sweden. He then flew near Brown's plane in close formation on the bomber's port side wing, so that German anti-aircraft units would not target it, and escorted the damaged B-17 across the coast until they reached open water. Brown, still unsure of Stigler's intentions, ordered his dorsal turret gunner to target his guns on Stigler but not open fire, to warn him off. Understanding the message and certain that the bomber was finally out of German airspace, Stigler departed with a salute.

== Later life ==
After the German pilot spared his life, he made it his mission to find out who it was, and he would eventually meet Franz Stigler in the 1990s and they would remain close friends until Stigler's death in March 2008. He was a scientist and inventor in his later life and received the Air Force Cross and Purple Heart. He lived in Miami from 1972 until his death on November 24, 2008, at the age of 86.

== Awards and honors ==

U.S. Air Force Command Pilot Badge
Air Force Cross	Distinguished Flying Cross	Purple Heart
Air Medal with three bronze oak leaf clusters	Air Force Commendation Medal	Air Force Presidential Unit Citation with bronze oak leaf cluster
Army Good Conduct Medal	American Defense Service Medal	American Campaign Medal
Asiatic–Pacific Campaign Medal	European–African–Middle Eastern Campaign Medal with three bronze campaign stars	World War II Victory Medal
Army of Occupation Medal	National Defense Service Medal with bronze service star	Armed Forces Expeditionary Medal
Air Force Longevity Service Award with four bronze oak leaf clusters	Armed Forces Reserve Medal	Small Arms Expert Marksmanship Ribbon

=== Air Force Cross citation ===

Brown, Charles L.
Second Lieutenant, U.S Army Air Forces
527th Bombardment Squadron, 379th Bombardment Group (Heavy), 8th Air Force
Date of Action: December 20, 1943

Citation:

The President of the United States of America, authorized by Title 10, Section 8742, United States Code, takes pleasure in presenting the Air Force Cross to Second Lieutenant Charles Lester Brown for extraordinary heroism in military operations against an armed enemy of the United States as a B-17 Pilot of the 527th Bombardment Squadron, 379th Bombardment Group (Heavy), Eighth Air Force, in action over Germany, 20 December 1943. On this date while attacking a heavily defended target over occupied Germany, Lieutenant Brown’s aircraft sustained severe flak damage, including destruction of the Plexiglas nose, wing damage, and major damage to the number two and four engines. Lieutenant Brown provided invaluable instructions to the copilot and crew requiring the number two engine to be shut down. He then expertly managed to keep the number four engine producing partial power. This action enabled his crew to complete the improbable bombing run and bomb delivery on this important strategic target. Immediately upon leaving the target, sever multiple engine damage prevented maintaining their position in formation. During this extreme duress, the demonstrated airmanship displayed by Lieutenant Brown could only be described as crucially pivotal to the aircraft’s survival and displayed by only more seasoned and experienced aviators during the War. His violent, evasive tactics to counter the multiple enemy efforts to destroy their airplane directly contributed to his crew and his aircraft’s survival. Alone and outnumbered, the aircraft was mercilessly attacked by the enemy in which crew difficulties were compounded when discovered only three defensive guns were operational, the others frozen in the -75 degree Fahrenheit temperatures. The result of this brief, but devastating aerial battle was one crew member dead; another critically wounded that would require amputation of his leg; serious damage of the third engine; the complete destruction of the aircraft’s left elevator and stabilizer; the inoperability of the bomber’s oxygen and communications systems; and the complete shredding of the rudder by enemy fire that produced a death roll of the plane as it spiraled helplessly out of control causing the entire crew to temporarily lose consciousness. Miraculously, prior to ground impact, Lieutenant Brown and the copilot regained consciousness and managed to regain full flight control by pulling the heavily damaged aircraft out of its nose-dive. Although managing to recover this aircraft from certain doom, the crew’s plight was further complicated when a lone German fighter witnessed the maneuver, now attempted to force the crippled aircraft to land. Displaying coolness, courage and airmanship of more senior pilots, he boldly rejected the enemy fighter’s attempts at a forced landing and directed the struggling aircraft to the North Sea. While attempting this improbable, treacherous return to home station, Lieutenant Brown’s command and control was instrumental to the remaining crew’s survival. While in the cockpit, he provided the essential engine control, fuel management, and piloting skills necessary to the cockpit team during their hazardous, yet miraculous return of the aircraft’s perilous crossing of the North Sea back to home station in England. Through his extraordinary heroism, superb airmanship, and aggressiveness in the face of the enemy, Lieutenant Brown reflected the highest credit upon himself and the United States Army Air Corps.
