= Donald E. Casey Sr. =

Politician from Chicago

- Born: November 6, 1924; Oak Park, Illinois, U.S.
- Died: March 14, 2016 (aged 91)
- Military career
- Allegiance: United States
- Branch: United States Air Force
- Rank: 2nd Lieutenant
- Conflicts: WWII
- Awards: Distinguished Flying Cross, Air Medal, POW Medal, Chevalier's Legion of Honor

Donald Emmett Casey Sr. (1924-2016) was a World War II veteran and POW from Chicago who later became a lawyer and author while deeply involving himself with the city's political world.

== Early life ==
Casey was born to Virginia Smith Casey and James Douglas Casey, a Chicago investment banker and World War I Air Service veteran, in Oak Park, IL as the second of four children. He grew up in River Forest and attended boarding school at the Campion Jesuit High School in Prairie du Chien, WI. He went on to attend Purdue University though he never completed a degree there.

== Military service ==
For three of his four years at the Campion Jesuit High School, Casey was a member of the ROTC program. He had to wait until he turned eighteen before enlisting, but went on to sign up for the Army Air Forces' Aviation Cadet program while he was still a student at Purdue. In February 1943, he was called for active duty and completed aerial navigation school by that October and was given the rank of 2nd Lieutenant. Assigned to the crew of a B-17 Flying Fortress, Casey and his fellows flew their new airplane from Nebraska to England to join the war effort. Once there, they were assigned to the 379th Bombardment Group stationed at RAF Kimbolton. In June 1944, he was promoted to Deputy Lead Navigator and on his 28th mission of the war, Casey's bomber was shot down by German anti-aircraft fire over Hamburg, Germany. All nine of the crew members survived by bailing out and using their parachutes but four were later killed in Hamburg by civilians. The remaining five were captured and taken to prisoner-of-war camps in what is now Poland. Casey was sent to Stalag Luft III and remained there until January 27, 1945. As advancing allied forces moved closer to the camp, the Germans moved Casey and the other airmen to Stalag VII-A in Moosburg, Bavaria. To do so, the Germans forced Casey and his fellow prisoners to march through a blizzard and in subzero temperatures for roughly 50 miles (80 km). They were then loaded into freight cars that carried them the rest of the way to Moosburg. Conditions at this overcrowded camp with minimal rations causing starvation and numerous health problems. In April 1945, they were liberated by General George Patton's Third Army. Casey eventually put together a memoir of his wartime experiences called "To Fight for My Country, Sir!"

== Professional life ==
After the war, Casey attended Dartmouth College and received an undergraduate degree in economics in 1948. He proceeded to work as an investment banker in New York and Denver before returning to Chicago to work for an insurance company. It was during these three years in Chicago that Casey attended Loyola University Chicago School of Law classes in the evenings, from which he obtained a law degree in 1957. He then went into private law practice, eventually becoming a partner at Springer, Casey & Dienstag.

== Political involvement ==
Additionally, he made a number of bids for judge in Chicago and suburban Cook County during the 1970s and 1980s.
