= Eagle 7 (tank) =

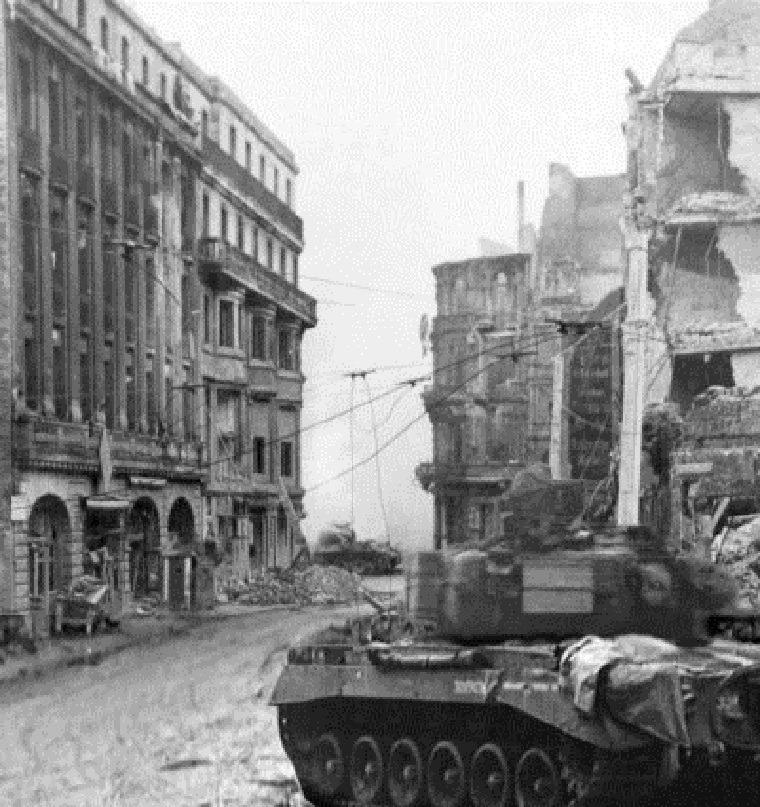
- Eagle 7 in Cologne with a Panther in the background
- Type: M26 Pershing
- Place of origin: United States

Service history
- In service: 1944–1945
- Used by: American Army
- Wars: World War II (Western Europe)

Specifications
- Width: 11 ft 6 in (3.51 m)
- Height: 9 ft 1.5 in (2.781 m)
- Crew: 5 (commander, gunner, loader, driver, co-driver/bow gunner)
- Main armament: 90 mm Gun M3; 70 rounds
- Secondary armament: 2× .30-06 M1919 Browning (5,000 rounds); 1× .50 cal. M2 Browning (550 rounds)
- Engine: Ford GAF; 8-cylinder, gasoline 450–500 hp (340–370 kW)
- Power/weight: 11.9 hp (8.9 kW)/tonne

Eagle 7 was an M26 Pershing tank used by the American Army's 3rd Armored Division near the end of World War II, notable for a tank battle in front of the Cologne Cathedral and the belated award of the Bronze Star to its crew.

== Genesis ==
The crew of Eagle 7 had been serving together since September 1944. They were then transferred from their original M4 Sherman tank to the new M26 Pershing, which they nicknamed Eagle 7. Eagle 7 was one of the 20 M26 Pershing tanks that had been shipped to Europe for combat trials before the Battle of the Bulge.

== Service ==
On 6 March 1945, just after the 3rd Armored Division had entered the city of Cologne and in the Battle of Cologne (1945), a famous tank duel took place. A Panther tank, commanded by Lieutenant Wilhelm Bartelborth, was on the street in front of Cologne Cathedral, lying in wait for enemy tanks. Two M4 Shermans were supporting infantry and came up on the same street as the Panther. They ended up stopping just before the Cathedral because of rubble in the street and did not see the enemy Panther. The lead Sherman was knocked out, killing three of the five crew members. Eagle 7 was in the next street over and was called over to engage the Panther tank. What happened next was described by Eagle 7's gunner, Corporal Clarence Smoyer:

We were told to just move into the intersection far enough to fire into the side of the enemy tank, which had its gun facing up the other street [where the Sherman had been destroyed]. However, as we entered the intersection, our driver had his periscope turned toward the Panther and saw their gun turning to meet us. When I turned our turret, I was looking into the Panther's gun tube; so instead of stopping to fire, our driver drove into the middle of the intersection so we wouldn't be a sitting target. As we were moving, I fired once. Then we stopped and I fired two more shells to make sure they wouldn't fire at our side. All three of our shells penetrated, one under the gun shield and two on the side. The two side hits went completely through and out the other side.

Four out of the original five of the Panther's crew were able to successfully bail out of their tank before it was destroyed, including Bartelborth. The action was recorded by United States Army Signal Corps cameraman Sergeant Jim Bates.

== Awards ==
Nearly 75 years later on 18 September 2019, the crewmembers of Eagle 7 received the Bronze Star. Clarence Smoyer, the last surviving member of the crew received his award in person at the age of 95, while Bob Earley, John DeRiggi, William McVey and Homer Davis received their bronze stars posthumously. Bob Early, the tank's commander, had already received a bronze star for his actions during the Battle of Cologne.

== Crew members ==
- Bob Earley (Commander)
- John DeRiggi (Loader)
- Clarence Smoyer (Gunner)
- William McVey (Driver)
- Homer Davis (Bow gunner)
