= Better Angels (NCIS) =

- NCIS episode
- Episode no.: Season 11; Episode 7
- Directed by: Tony Wharmby
- Written by: Gina Monreal
- Original air date: November 5, 2013

Guest appearances
- Judson Willie Pickard III as Marine Sergeant Michael Dawson; Ralph Waite as Jackson Gibbs; Josh Gordon Emerson as Aaron Connolly; Rocky McMurray as Howard County P.D. Officer Ray Mitchell; Kelvin Yu as Sebastian Kim; Caryn West as DCS Department Head Karen Fox; Connie Jackson as Elaine; Tom Fitzpatrick as Walter Beck; Jocelyn Ayanna as Asabe Dawson; Andrew Lander as Young Jackson Gibbs; Austin Bowerman as Young Walter Beck

Episode chronology
← Previous "Oil & Water"	Next → "Alibi"
- NCIS season 11

"Better Angels" is the seventh episode of the eleventh season of the American police procedural drama NCIS, and the 241st episode overall. It originally aired on CBS in the United States on November 5, 2013. The episode is written by Gina Monreal and directed by Tony Wharmby, and was seen by 19.18 million viewers. This is the final episode to feature Ralph Waite as Jackson Gibbs as well as his final screen work; he died three months after this episode was broadcast.

== Plot ==
The team investigates the death of Marine Sergeant Michael Dawson, who was apparently killed trying to stop a robbery attempt. As the team tries to track down the robber, Leroy Jethro Gibbs receives a call from the police that his father, Jack, had just had his driver's license revoked and needs to be picked up from the station. Gibbs picks up Jack, who informs him that they need to go see Walter Beck, an old acquaintance who saved his life during World War II. Walter is dying, and Jack has never thanked him for his help. Gibbs reluctantly leaves the case to McGee and DiNozzo while he assists his father. However, their search leads to an apparent dead end, with McGee not being able to find any record of a Walter Beck in Jack's squadron. Thinking his father is either lying to him or showing signs of dementia, Gibbs returns to Washington to take charge of the case again.

Eventually, the team discovers that the robbery was staged, with Dawson as the intended target. They track down one of Dawson’s former friends, who reveals that Dawson had been trying to help him overcome his drug addiction and had confronted his dealer, leading to his death. The friend identifies the store owner as the dealer, and a subsequent search of the shop provides sufficient evidence to secure a conviction.

Afterwards, Gibbs confronts Jack about making up the story about Walter, pointing out there was nobody in his squadron with that name. Jack explains that Walter was a German Luftwaffe pilot who saved his life despite officially being his enemy at the time. With this new information, Abby is able to track down where Walter is staying, and Jack and Walter have an emotional reunion, with Jack introducing his son to Walter. Jack had explained that Walter was wracked with guilt for fighting in the war despite never believing in Nazism, and Jack wanted to ameliorate his guilt, by showing that Walter not only saved Jack's life, but made it possible for Gibbs to be born, and Gibbs is a government agent who solves crimes and has helped countless people.

== Production ==
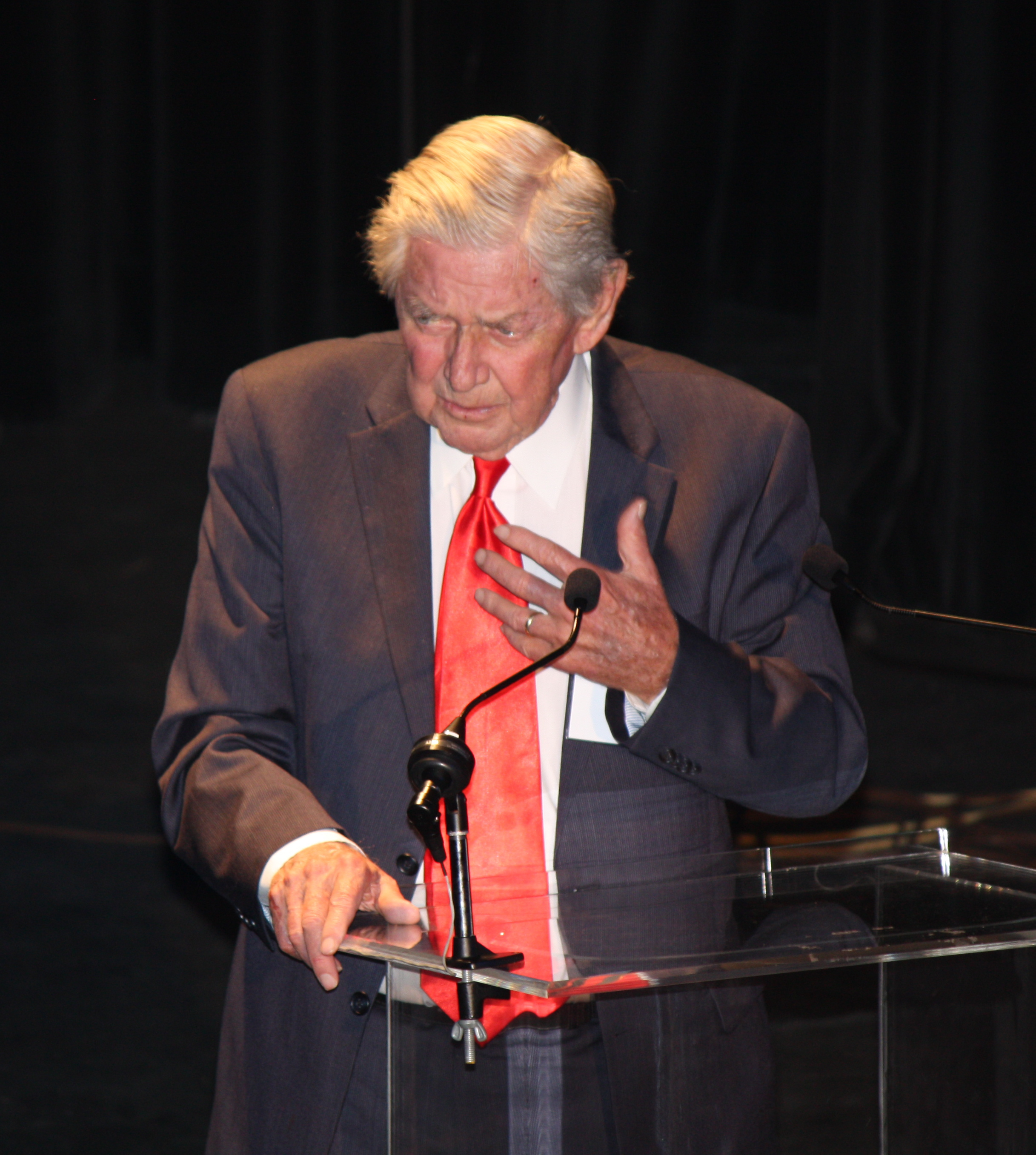
Ralph Waite reprised his role as Gibbs' father. It would be his final screen appearance before his death three months after this episode’s original broadcast.

"Better Angels" is written by Gina Monreal and directed by Tony Wharmby. On the day the episode aired, executive producer Gary Glasberg revealed some insight, and said it was an emotional story "based on some real historical storytelling". The episode also featured "some terrific flashbacks to young Jackson Gibbs".

Ralph Waite's return as Jackson Gibbs, the father of Leroy Jethro Gibbs, was announced by Glasberg on September 30, 2013. This episode marks Waite's final appearance as Jackson Gibbs, as the actor died on February 13, 2014, three months after this episode aired.

== Reception ==
"Better Angels" was seen by 19.18 million live viewers at its November 5, 2013 broadcast, with a 2.9/8 share among adults aged 18 to 49. A rating point represents one percent of the total number of television sets in American households, and a share means the percentage of television sets in use tuned to the program. In total viewers, "Better Angels" was the highest rated show on the night it aired.

Douglas Wolfe from TV Fanatic gave the episode 4.8/5 and stated that "the dynamic between Gibbs and his father proved to be the more compelling story [in the episode]. [...] I can't think of another such complicated - and therefore real - father-son relationship on TV right now. Gina Monreal - who wrote this episode - deserves high praise for getting it right."

== See also ==
- Charlie Brown and Franz Stigler incident, a real-life event similar to the Jackson Gibbs/Walter Beck plot line
