= Oil & Water (NCIS) =

- NCIS episode
- Episode no.: Season 11; Episode 6
- Directed by: Tom Wright
- Written by: Jennifer Corbett
- Original air date: October 29, 2013

Guest appearances
- Diane Neal as Abigail Borin; Leslie Hope as SecNav Sarah Porter; William Ragsdale as Brett Creevy; Rod Rowland as Operations Officer Jonah McGuire; Jon Lindstrom as Perry Davidson; Rick Gonzalez as Lenny Machaca; Chelsea Harris as Danielle Benton; Fay Masterson as Paige Hebner; Brent Huff as Rig Foreman; Michael Buonomo as Coast Guard Petty Officer Third Class Dennis Latrobe; Peter Downing as Captain

Episode chronology
← Previous "Once a Crook"	Next → "Better Angels"
- NCIS season 11

"Oil & Water" is the sixth episode of the eleventh season of the American police procedural drama NCIS, and the 240th episode overall. It originally aired on CBS in the United States on October 29, 2013. The episode is written by Jennifer Corbett and directed by Tom Wright, and was seen by 19.30 million viewers.

== Plot ==
Abby and McGee arrive to work only to find themselves victims of a Halloween prankster. A routine drill on an off-shore oil drilling platform turns into reality when it is bombed and the NCIS team is called to the oil rig when one of the employees, a Marine reservist, is found dead. Gibbs and his team join forces with the Coast Guard Investigative Service and old friend CGIS Agent Abigail Borin. After discovering the blast was caused by a bomb, the team investigates several suspects including a close friend of the reservist, an environmental activist, and a cook with a criminal past, but runs out of leads. However, thanks to a piece of rare sturgeon leather Abby finds, she manages to trace it to the briefcase of the oil company's legal counsel, who planned the bombing in order to short sell his company's stock. However, he never intended to hurt anybody.

During the investigation, Borin confides to Gibbs that the case makes her feel uncomfortable, as when she was a Marine serving in Iraq, she was nearly killed by an IED and lost three of her men, which is what caused her to join CGIS. However, she subtly implies that she would be willing to leave CGIS to join Gibbs' team.

Meanwhile, McGee and Ducky confront DiNozzo, who they believe to be the prankster. DiNozzo denies it and when he tries to leave, becomes the victim of a prank himself. When Borin visits Gibbs, she playfully hints that she thinks that he was responsible for the earlier pranks, but chooses to keep this to herself.

== Production ==
"Oil & Water" is written by Jennifer Corbett and directed by Tom Wright. In the aftermath of Ziva's farewell executive producer Gary Glasberg wanted to have some episodes with "fun people" and "familiar faces", before introducing her replacement. The return of CGIS agent Abigail Borin was one of them, and Glasberg described her appearance as a "really interesting, fun way" of filling the void after Ziva.

On October 4, 2013, it was revealed by Glasberg that Diane Neal would reprise her role of agent Borin, making it her fifth appearance on NCIS.

== Reception ==
"Oil & Water" was seen by 19.30 million live viewers at its October 29, 2013 broadcast, with a 3.0/9 share among adults aged 18 to 49. A rating point represents one percent of the total number of television sets in American households, and a share means the percentage of television sets in use tuned to the program. In total viewers, "Oil & Water" was the highest rated show on the night it aired.

Douglas Wolfe from TV Fanatic gave the episode 4.5/5 and stated that "The story for the case included some well-crafted plot points, which diverted the team [...] from the real culprit all the way through".
