= Battle of Cologne (1945) =

WWII allied advance into Germany

- Part of Western Front and Western Allied Invasion of Germany of World War II
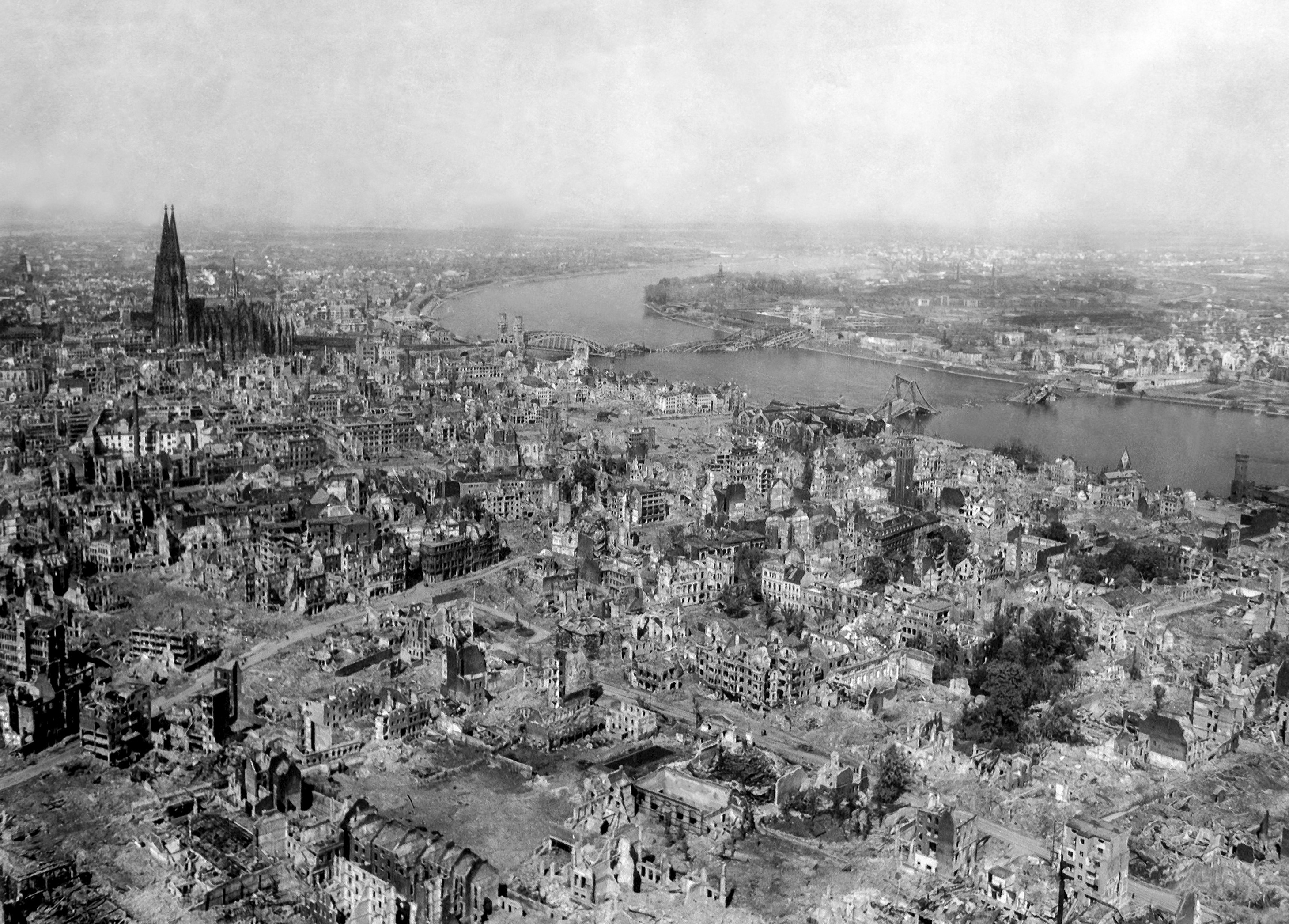
- Cologne in April 1945
Date	5–7 March 1945
Location	Cologne, Germany
Result	American victory

Belligerents
United States; 104th Infantry Division; 413th Infantry Regiment; 414th Infantry Regiment; 415th Infantry Regiment; 3rd Armored Division; Combat Command A; Combat Command B; Elements of the 9th Armored Division	Germany; LXXXI Army Corps; 9th Panzer Division; Elements of the 3rd Panzergrenadier Division; 363rd Volksgrenadier Division; Elements of the 11th Panzer Division; Volkssturm units

Commanders and leaders
Terry de la Mesa Allen Sr.	Harald Freiherr von Elverfeldt †

Strength
Two infantry divisions; Elements of two armored divisions; Up to tens of thousands of troops; 20 M26 Pershings	40,000 troops or fewer (approximately) A few Panther tanks

Casualties and losses
20-50 killed Several hundred wounded 8–12 M4 Sherman tanks destroyed	~300–800+ killed ~2,000–5,000 captured 5–10 tanks destroyed

The Battle of Cologne was part of Operation Lumberjack and refers to the Allied advance that took place from 5 to 7 March 1945, which led to the capture of the western German city of Cologne.

== Prelude ==
Before the outbreak of the Second World War, Cologne was the fourth largest city in German Reich and the largest city on the river Rhine, with a population of approximately 800,000 people. The city of Cologne was bombed by the Royal Air Force (RAF) in 262 separate air raids during World War II, this in response to the bombing of London (September 1940 to May 1941). Cologne was an important military target, being a heavily industrialized city with many factories producing war supplies and the city had a large railway network, used for the transportation of troops and weapons. A total of 34,711 long tons of bombs were dropped on Cologne, with the last air raid carried out on 2 March 1945. By the beginning of March 1945 most of the city was destroyed, with roughly 20,000 people remaining in the city.

== Battle ==
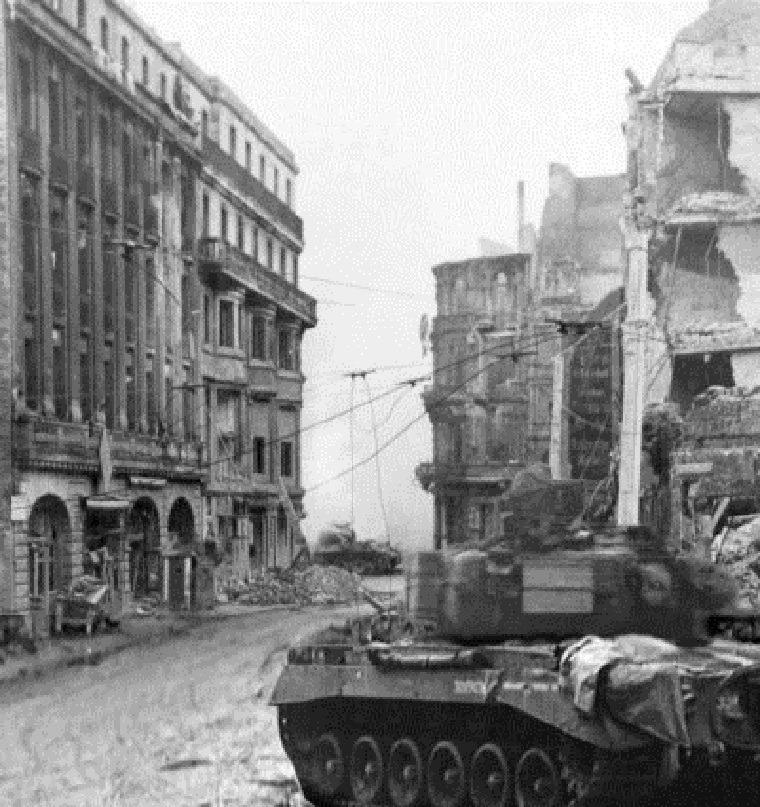
Pershing moves into intersection, Panther lurking in the background

During the night of 3 March, Allied aircraft dropped propaganda leaflets over the city, telling its citizens to disobey the directives of the Nazi leadership, asking the inhabitants not to evacuate the city since they had nothing to fear from the advancing troops. The Allied columns approached Cologne from three directions, the 3rd Armored Division striking from the northwest, 104th Infantry Division coming from the west and 9th Armored Division clearing sections south of the city in conjunction with the 9th Infantry Division. On 5 March, the 3rd Armored Division launched a final advance on Cologne. On 6 March the American columns moved out of their positions toward the heart of the city.

Near the city centre there was an engagement with a German Panther tank; this skirmish was captured on film by US cameramen from the 165th Photo Signal Company. The German Panther was lying in ambush near the train station; two advancing Sherman tanks were slowed down by a pile of rubble. The Shermans got stuck in a narrow street, which made them an easy target for the German tank. Two of the Panther's 75mm shells hit the turret of the leading Sherman, a third shell hit the tracks of the second Sherman tank behind it. A nearby Pershing tank, informally known as Eagle 7, was sent to take out the Panther. The two tanks were in each other's sights, but the German tank commander believed it to be a German tank and told his gunner to hold fire, as he had never seen a Pershing. Finally the Panther tank was taken out by the advancing Pershing.

As the Americans moved towards the Rhine, the Wehrmacht (Panzer-Brigade 106th Feldherrnhalle) demolished the Hohenzollern Bridge, the last link between the east and west of the city. Although the Allies had failed to capture a bridge over the Rhine near Cologne, further south the 9th Armored Division of the U.S. First Army had advanced unexpectedly quickly towards the Rhine. They were very surprised to see that the Ludendorff bridge, one of the last bridges across the Rhine, was still standing, and they captured and defended this crucial asset during the Battle of Remagen. By 7 March, all of Cologne west of the Rhine was captured by the Allies, the boroughs on the right bank remained under German control until mid-April 1945.

== See also ==
- Western Allied invasion of Germany
- Operation Lumberjack
- Bombing of Cologne in World War II
- History of Cologne
- Spearhead (Makos novel)

== Sources ==
- Zumbro, Derek S. (2006). Battle for the Ruhr: The German Army's Final Defeat in the West. University Press of Kansas. ISBN 978-0-7006-1490-5.
- "Bomber Command Campaign Diary", Royal Air Force Bomber Command 60th Anniversary, RAF, 6 April 2005, archived from the original on 6 July 2007 – via National Archives
