= Alibi (NCIS) =

- NCIS episode
- Episode no.: Season 11; Episode 8
- Directed by: Holly Dale
- Written by: George Schenck and Frank Cardea
- Original air date: November 12, 2013

Guest appearances
- Salli Richardson-Whitfield as Carrie Clark; Dameon Clarke as Homicide Detective Paul Dockry; Steven Helmkamp as Marine Staff Sergeant Justin Dunne; Rodney Eastman as Wendell Kaiser; Nicole Steinwedell as Olivia Chandler; Jeff Harlan as Reverend Miller; Brian Huskey as Front Desk Clerk, Chevy Chase Lodge; Connie Jackson as Elaine; Eltony Williams as Marine Gunnery Sergeant Cal Groves; Abe Daniels as Marine Private Daniel Cliff

Episode chronology
← Previous "Better Angels"	Next → "Gut Check"
- NCIS season 11

"Alibi" is the eighth episode of the eleventh season of the American police procedural drama NCIS, and the 242nd episode overall. It originally aired on CBS in the United States on November 12, 2013. The episode is written by George Schenck and Frank Cardea and directed by Holly Dale, and was seen by 19.37 million viewers.

== Plot ==
The team goes out to investigate a fatal hit and run near Quantico involving the victim who is Petty Officer Third Class Jodie Ray and they eventually manage to gather enough evidence to lead them to Marine Staff Sergeant Justin Dunne. After being arrested, Dunne requests an attorney, and hires former FBI agent Carrie Clark, who also happens to be an old acquaintance of the team. Dunne tells Carrie that he has an alibi, in that he was involved in a murder outside of the base at the time of the hit and run, and that somebody else must have stolen his truck. Due to attorney-client privilege, Carrie cannot tell Gibbs and the team anything about Dunne's crime other than he has a solid alibi. However, she manages to leave small, subtle clues for the team to follow. The team then discovers Dunne indeed was not driving his truck at the time of the hit and run, and manage to track down and arrest Marine Private Daniel Cliff who stole it.

Gibbs and the team then continue to investigate Dunne's alibi. Eventually, the plot begins to unravel when the team discovers that Dunne is part of a conspiracy with Olivia Chandler, a gold digger, and Wendell Kaiser, a chronic gambler deep in debt. All three individuals met during an Alcoholics Anonymous meeting at a church. Dunne murdered Kaiser's bookie to clear his debt, and Kaiser would murder Chandler's husband so she could inherit his fortune. The plan would be foolproof since the murderers had no connection to their victims while anybody else with a motive would have an airtight alibi. Unfortunately, they have to be careful how to approach the situation without revealing that Carrie had broken her attorney-client privilege. With the help of Homicide Detective Paul Dockry, an old acquaintance of Gibbs, they manage to trick Kaiser in testifying against Dunne and Chandler. Afterwards, Carrie finds Gibbs at the diner, and they both agree that they are not so different in that they are willing to bend the rules and risk their careers in order to do the right thing.

Meanwhile, McGee is confused when Tony exhibits a surprisingly positive and calm demeanor, takes buses and accepts carpools from other people to work instead of replacing his damaged car. Upon tracking Kaiser to the church, Tony reveals to McGee that he is currently attending men's support group meetings at the church in hopes of finding balance within his life after Ziva's departure.

== Production ==
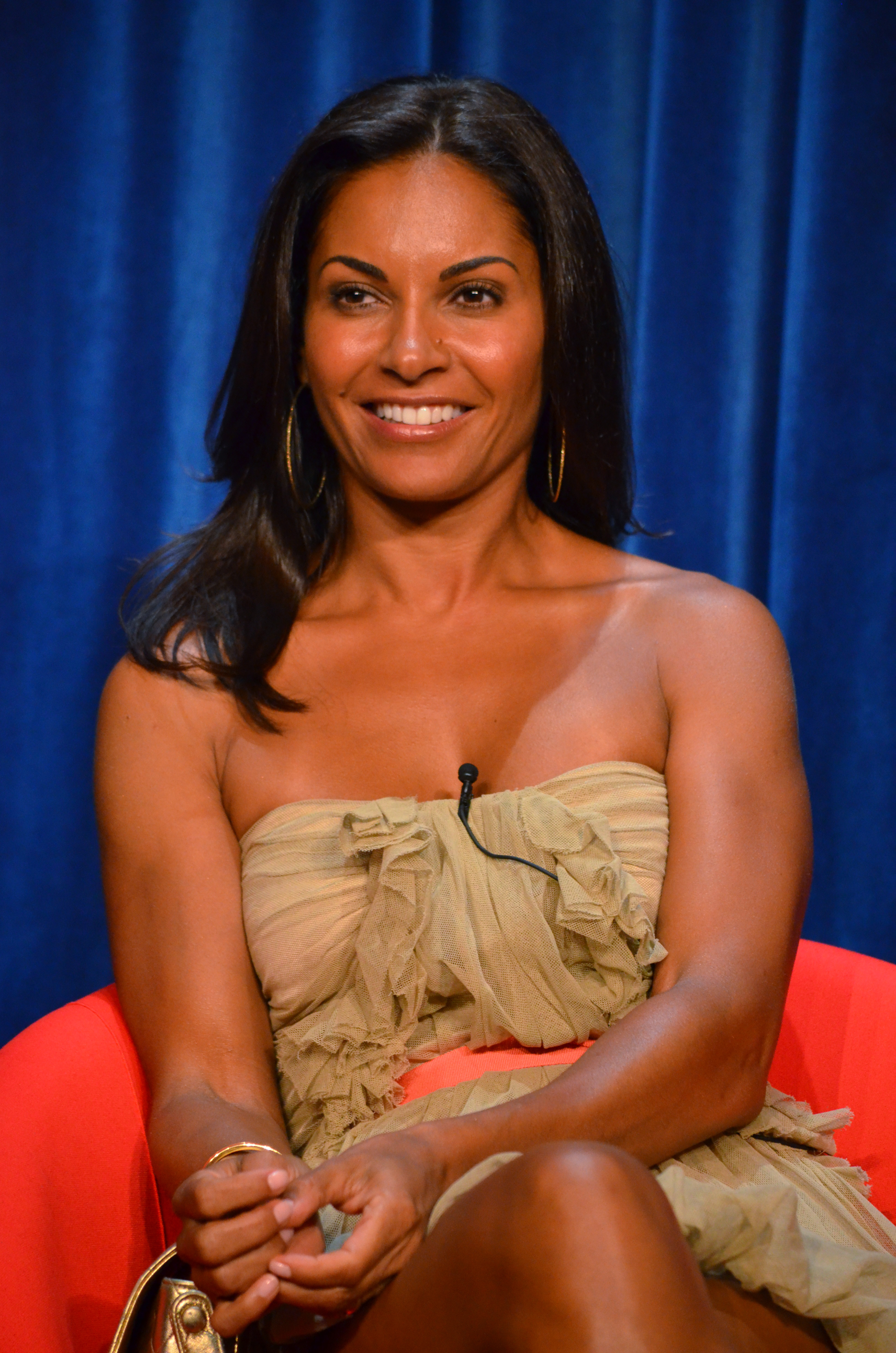
Salli Richardson-Whitfield guest starred as former FBI agent Carrie Clark.

"Alibi" is written by George Schenck and Frank Cardea and directed by Holly Dale. The episode focused on Tony's "strange behavior" in the aftermath of Ziva's absence. According to executive producer Gary Glasberg, "It’s [...] the arc of Tony working through what’s happened this season — Ziva’s departure, finding what’s next for him…. It’s Tony being Tony". Glasberg explained that it's "much like a real relationship", where "it takes time to recover and to figure out what’s next".

On November 5, 2013, Glasberg announced the casting of Salli Richardson-Whitfield as an "FBI agent-turned-attorney".

== Reception ==
"Alibi" was seen by 19.37 million live viewers at its November 12, 2013 broadcast, with a 3.0/8 share among adults aged 18 to 49. A rating point represents one percent of the total number of television sets in American households, and a share means the percentage of television sets in use tuned to the program. In total viewers, "Alibi" was the highest rated show on the night it aired.

Douglas Wolfe from TV Fanatic gave the episode 4.5/5 and stated that "Isn't it great to know that the angst NCIS fans have had about Tony's yo-yo behavior over the past few episodes was justified? [...] This season the focus has changed. Now it's all about Tony and whether the cheese might be sliding just a little bit off of his cracker. And that was planned and - so far - executed perfectly by the show's writers."
