= Larry Alexander (journalist) =

American journalist and military historian

Larry Alexander (born January 28, 1951) is an American journalist and military historian who has written a number of books about World War II, most notably about Easy Company of the 506th Parachute Infantry Regiment of the 101st Airborne Division of the U.S. Army. Easy Company was made famous principally by Stephen Ambrose's book and the Band of Brothers (TV miniseries) of that name.

== Career ==
Alexander has been a columnist for the Lancaster Newspapers, Inc., a newspaper in Lancaster, Pennsylvania since 1993. He retired from the paper in 2015. While with Lancaster Newspapers, he was nominated for a Pulitzer Prize in 2005 and has won state-level journalism awards. He grew up on the same street as Dick Winters in Ephrata, Pennsylvania and made friends with him in 2001. Alexander began writing Winter's biography two years later. His first book, Biggest Brother: The Life of Major Dick Winters, the Man Who Led the Band of Brothers, was published in 2005 and made the New York Times bestseller list. He then went looking for a new topic and discovered the Alamo Scout web page. He followed up his first success with Shadows In The Jungle: The Alamo Scouts Behind Japanese Lines In World War II and In the Footsteps of the Band of Brothers: A Return to Easy Company's Battlefields with Sgt. Forrest Guth, both published in 2010. He then co-authored A Higher Call with journalist and historian Adam Makos, which also made the New York Times and International best sellers lists; and Bloody Ridge and Beyond with Marlin Groft.

== Personal and family ==
Alexander lives in Ephrata, Pa. with his wife, Barbara.

== Bibliography ==
- Biggest Brother: The Life of Major Dick Winters, The Man Who Led the Band of Brothers, 2005
- Shadows in the Jungle: The Alamo Scouts Behind Japanese Lines in World War II, 2010
- In the Footsteps of the Band of Brothers: A Return to Easy Company's Battlefields with Sgt. Forrest Guth, 2010
- A Higher Call: An Incredible True Story of Combat and Chivalry of Combat in the War-Torn Skies of World War II, 2012 co-author Adam Makos
- Bloody Ridge and Beyond: A World War II Marine's Memoirs of Edison's Raiders in the Pacific, 2014, co-author Marlin Groft
