= Anonymous Was a Woman =

- NCIS episode
- Episode no.: Season 11; Episode 4
- Directed by: Terrence O'Hara
- Written by: Steven D. Binder
- Original air date: October 15, 2013

Guest appearances
- Muse Watson as Mike Franks; Jackie Geary as NCIS Special Agent Susan Grady; Lolita Davidovich as Catherine Tavier; Ramon De Ocampo as Navy Lieutenant Thomas Gorman; Tehmina Sunny as Leyla Shakarji; Fred Cross as Roland Pulvino; Alexander Wraith as Farshad Sarabi; Paul Hodge as U.N. Soldier; Nikka Far as Elina; Paris Benjamin as Mor; Shani Atias as Stoic Afghan Girl; Jasmine Di Angelo as Halia; Ben MacCabee as Afghan Local Leader; Zoey Diaz as Amira

Episode chronology
← Previous "Under the Radar"	Next → "Once a Crook"
- NCIS season 11

"Anonymous Was a Woman" is the fourth episode of the eleventh season of the American police procedural drama NCIS, and the 238th episode overall. It originally aired on CBS in the United States on October 15, 2013. The episode is written by Steven D. Binder and directed by Terrence O'Hara, and was seen by 18.83 million viewers. The title is a quote from Virginia Woolf's influential essay, "A Room of One's Own".

== Plot ==
Marine Sergeant Patricia Moreno is found dead and temporary replacement Agent Susan Grady joins McGee and Tony in the investigation. Still reeling from the loss of Ziva, McGee and Tony plot a way to "chase away" Agent Grady. The body becomes a "Jane Doe" when McGee discovers that Sergeant Moreno died in Afghanistan almost three years ago and the Jane Doe is an Afghan illegal immigrant who had supposedly stolen Moreno's identity. The late Mike Franks' daughter-in-law's name is found on a job application the Jane Doe had filed and the team finds out that Mike Franks had been helping a human rights group smuggle Afghan refugees into the United States. After they find and arrest the killer, the team discovers that their false identities were leaked from a women's shelter in Afghanistan. Gibbs and McGee travel to the shelter, where they find that one of the girls who had already left the shelter was threatened into leaking the information. Before they leave, however, the shelter is attacked by an Afghan mob. Gibbs manages to hold off the attackers long enough for a UN security team to arrive. Gibbs then arranges for the Afghan women in the shelter to be evacuated to the United States for asylum, as well as obtaining new identities and green cards for the women already smuggled there.

It is revealed through flashbacks that Franks attempted to recruit Gibbs to help him smuggle six Afghan refugees into the United States. However, Gibbs refused to sign an order that would authorize a military transport to evacuate them. Later, he finds out that the same six refugees were killed in a bomb attack due to his inaction, motivating him to rescue the Afghan women in the present.

Meanwhile, McGee and Tony's fears of Agent Grady replacing Ziva prove to be misguided, as Grady is actually applying for a position in San Diego.

== Production ==
"Anonymous Was a Woman" is written by Steven D. Binder and directed by Terrence O'Hara. In August 2013 it was announced that Muse Watson would reprise his role as Mike Franks, and executive producer Gary Glasberg described his return as "a really emotional storyline for Gibbs". Since Frank's death in season 8 Watson has appeared as a ghost, but in this episode he appears in flashback scenes.

== Reception ==
"Anonymous Was a Woman" was seen by 18.83 million live viewers at its October 15, 2013 broadcast, with a 3.1/9 share among adults aged 18 to 49. A rating point represents one percent of the total number of television sets in American households, and a share means the percentage of television sets in use tuned to the program. In total viewers, "Anonymous Was a Woman" was the highest rated show on the night it aired, and had higher ratings and attracted more adults aged 18–49 than the previous episode "Under the Radar".

Douglas Wolfe from TV Fanatic gave the episode 4.6/5 and stated that "While the story in "Anonymous Was a Woman" revolved around the "honor killing" death of an Afghan woman [...] the deeper story was one of regret. The profound and thoughtful universe behind Gibbs' quiet demeanor was ripped wide open for the viewers. [...] And what a sight it was."
