= Spearhead (Makos book) =

2019 war biography by Adam Makos

- First edition
- Author: Adam Makos
- Language: English
- Publisher: Ballantine Books
- Publication date: February 19, 2019
- Pages: 446
- ISBN: 1782395806

Spearhead: An American Tank Gunner, His Enemy, and a Collision of Lives in World War II is a book about Clarence Smoyer, written by military history author Adam Makos, and published by Ballantine Books in 2019.

The book reached number 3 on The New York Times Best Seller list on February 27, 2019.

== Characters ==
- Clarence Smoyer, American tank gunner
- Buck Marsh, Infantryman attached to the 3rd Armored Division
- Gustav Schaefer, German Panther tank radioman

== Plot summary ==
The book honors an unsung hero, Clarence Smoyer, who despite his hatred for violence, becomes the gunner of one of the first Pershing tanks in the European Theatre. Smoyer and his tank crew lead the American invasion of Nazi Germany. Smoyer, whose tank crew is instrumental to the Battle of Cologne, recounts his step-by-step moves in the battle, particularly, shooting a car which unbeknown to him is carrying civilians. At the same time, the car is being shot by a German tank whose gunner is named Gustav Schaefer. Schaefer and Smoyer shoot each other for a few seconds. It ends when Smoyer's crew shoot down a nearby building which disables Shaefer's tank, but leave the Germans inside the tank unharmed. Schaefer and one of his friends escape while the rest of the crew decides to stand and fight. Schaefer credits Smoyer for saving him and his friend.

The biography comes to an end with the meeting of Smoyer and Schaefer in Cologne, sharing their war stories and getting up to date since the war.

== Critical reception ==
It was listed on The New York Times Best Seller list on 26 February 2019.

== Later events ==
On September 18, 2019, Makos presided over a ceremony at the National World War II Memorial in which Smoyer and the other members of the Pershing tank crew were awarded Bronze Star medals with "V" device for valor. Smoyer attended the ceremony in person while the families of the other crewmembers, who have died, received the medals on their behalf.
