= Once a Crook (NCIS) =

- NCIS episode
- Episode no.: Season 11; Episode 5
- Directed by: Arvin Brown
- Written by: Christopher Silber
- Original air date: October 22, 2013

Guest appearances
- Margo Harshman as Delilah Fielding; Augustus Prew as Anton Markin; Patrick Mulvey as Milo Rankoff; Mac Brandt as Jake Spoke; Samantha Quan as Amy Linden; Andrew Friedman as George; Sherri Parker Lee as Martha; Dylan Gelula as Young Marie Markin; Susan Spano as Marie Markin; Wes McGee as Navy Petty Officer First Class Andrew Wells

Episode chronology
← Previous "Anonymous Was a Woman"	Next → "Oil & Water"
- NCIS season 11

"Once a Crook" is the fifth episode of the eleventh season of the American police procedural drama NCIS, and the 239th episode overall. It originally aired on CBS in the United States on October 22, 2013. The episode is written by Christopher Silber and directed by Arvin Brown, and was seen by 18.99 million viewers.

== Plot ==
When the body of a cryptoanalyst, Petty Officer First Class Andrew Wells is found dead on the road, Gibbs and the team are called in to investigate. The team at first believes that the murder is related to espionage, but find out that the cryptoanalyst was merely being scouted for a lucrative job in the private sector. Tony stumbles across evidence that implicates Anton Markin, a man he had met when he was still a Baltimore police officer. Tony had recruited Anton as an informant against the Russian mob, but the plan went awry when Anton murdered the Russian gangster he was spying on and went into hiding. As they try and track down Anton, the team finds out that Anton's sister Marie has been abducted as well. After apprehending Anton, Tony asks him why he betrayed his trust and killed the gangster. Anton reveals he killed the gangster in self-defense, but was too scared to turn himself in. Tony apologizes for not being there for Anton when he needed him the most, and Anton tells Tony everything he knows. The team deduces that the Russian mob is still looking to get revenge on Anton, and kidnapped Marie to lure him out. The cryptoanalyst was merely killed due to a case of mistaken identity. They confront Anton's boss at the bakery he used to work at and discover the murder weapon, revealing him to be the killer. They manage to find Marie and reunite her with Anton.

Throughout the episode, Tony is suffering from a severe case of insomnia due to Ziva's departure, and hasn't slept in days. However, after solving the case, he finally calms down enough to be able to sleep that night.

== Production ==
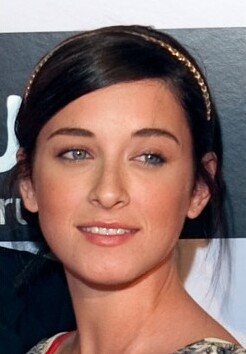
Margo Harshman made her second appearance as Delilah Fielding, McGee's girlfriend.

"Once a Crook" is written by Christopher Silber and directed by Arvin Brown. The episode was meant to be a second part of the season eight episode "Baltimore", which told the story about Tony as a detective in Baltimore P.D. and his first meeting with Gibbs. In "Once a Crook" it is revealed how Tony became a detective, and executive producer Gary Glasberg said that "Clearly something started to shift with [Tony's] interests in law enforcement", and continued to say that "Maybe there's still a piece missing that we'll get to later on". Michael Weatherly added that "There's a reason Gibbs picked Tony to be in his world". Some of it was shown in "Baltimore", "but what this episode shows is more how these guys have a shared understanding of the job", Weatherly continued.

Margo Harshman guest starred as Delilah Fielding, McGee's girlfriend employed at DoD. On September 26, TV Line announced Harshman's return, and wrote that she had "the potential" to become a recurring character this season.

== Reception ==
"Once a Crook" was seen by 18.99 million live viewers at its October 22, 2013 broadcast, with a 3.0/9 share among adults aged 18 to 49. A rating point represents one percent of the total number of television sets in American households, and a share means the percentage of television sets in use tuned to the program. In total viewers, "Once a Crook" was the highest rated show on the night it aired.

Douglas Wolfe from TV Fanatic gave the episode 4.4/5 and stated that "there was so much going on with this episode".
