= 527th Bombardment Squadron =

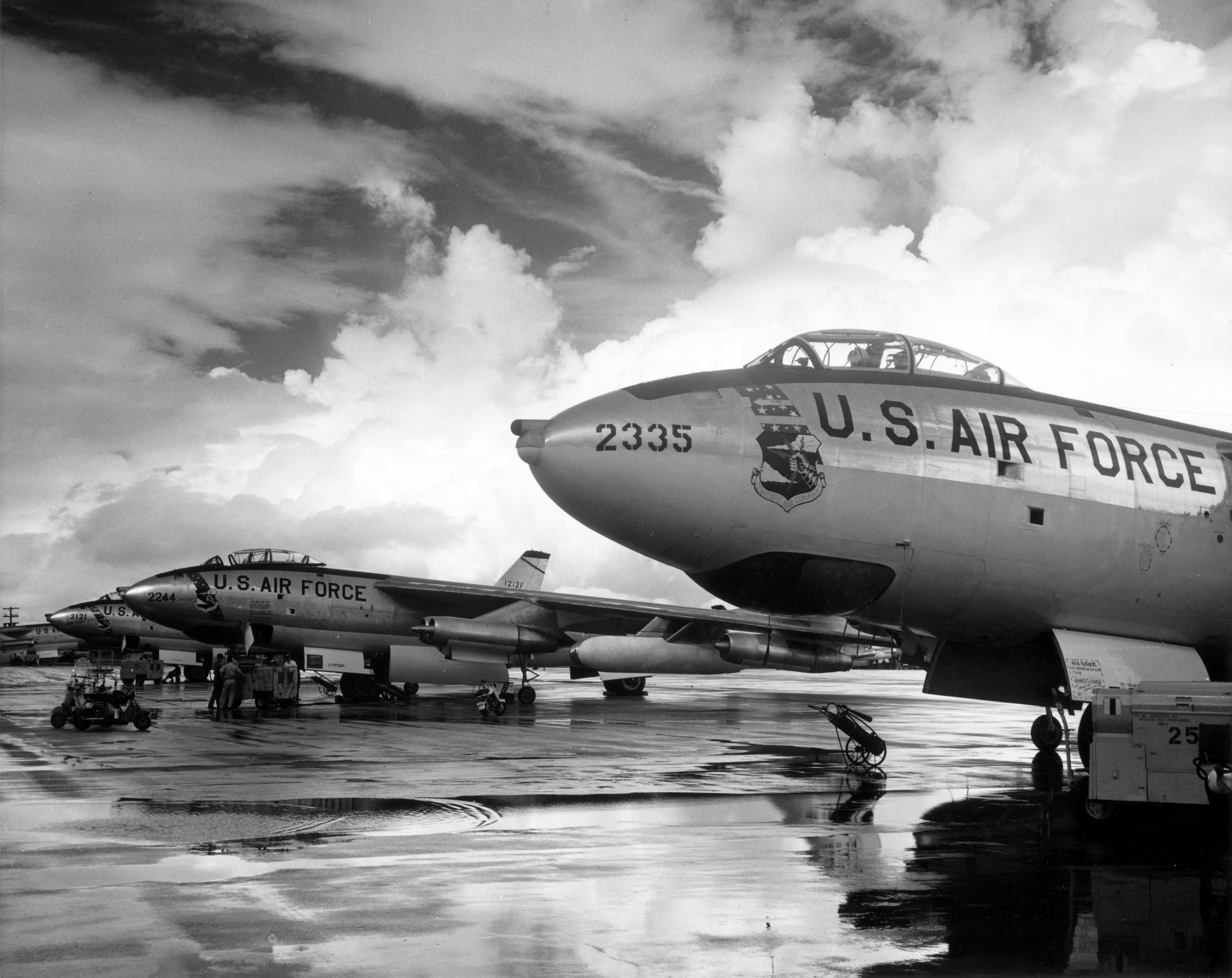
- Strategic Air Command B-47 Stratojets
- Active: 1942–1945; 1958–1961
- Country: United States
- Branch: United States Air Force
- Role: Medium bomber
- Engagements: European Theater of Operations
- Decorations: Distinguished Unit Citation

Insignia
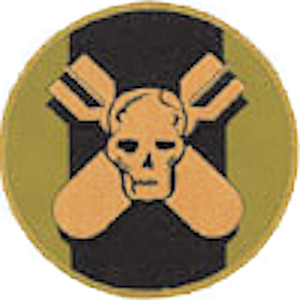
- 527th Bombardment Squadron emblem (Note: Approved 29 March 1943. Description: On a disc yellow, a pale black, surmounted by two white aerial bombs in saltire and a death's head yellow, trimmed black and white, all drop shadowed of black.)
- World War II Fuselage code: FO

The 527th Bombardment Squadron is an inactive United States Air Force unit. It was last assigned to the 379th Bombardment Wing at Homestead Air Force Base, Florida, where it was inactivated on 9 January 1961, when its parent wing converted to the Boeing B-52H Stratofortress..

The squadron was first activated during World War II. After training in the United States, it moved to England, where it participated in the strategic bombing campaign against Germany. The squadron twice was awarded the Distinguished Unit Citation for its combat actions. Following V-E Day, the squadron moved to Morocco, where it participated in the transportation of military personnel back to the United States until it was inactivated in June 1945.

The squadron was reactivated in 1958 as a Boeing B-47 Stratojet strategic bomber squadron, in response to Strategic Air Command's increased alert commitment. In 1960, it became non-operational, preparing for inactivation.

== History ==
=== World War II ===
==== Activation and training ====
The squadron was first activated at Geiger Field, Washington in November 1942 as one of the four original squadrons of the 379th Bombardment Group. After initial organization, a cadre moved to Wendover Field, Utah to begin training as a heavy bomber unit with the Boeing B-17 Flying Fortress. Training was completed by early April 1943, and the ground echelon moved to Camp Williams, Wisconsin, on 9 April, then proceeded to the port of embarkation at Camp Shanks, New York, where it boarded the RMS Aquitania for shipment to England in early May. The air echelon moved to Dow Field, Maine, to ferry their Flying Fortresses via the North Atlantic Ferry Route, starting on 15 April.

==== Combat in the European Theater ====
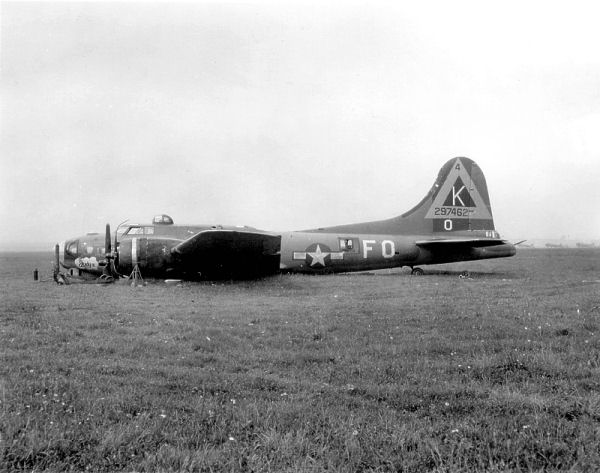
Squadron B-17 crash landed after a combat mission (Note: Aircraft is Lockheed Vega built Boeing B-17G-15-VE Flying Fortress, serial 42-97462, FO-O. It force landed on the Continent of Europe on 8 September 1944 and was salvaged on 14 November 1944. Baugher, Joe (7 March 2023). "1942 USAF Serial Numbers". Joe Baugher.)

The air echelon of the squadron arrived at RAF Bovingdon by 24 April 1943, and remained there until 20 May, when it joined the ground echelon at RAF Kimbolton, which was to be its combat station for the remainder of its time in the European Theater of Operations. The squadron flew its first combat mission on 29 May, and focused on the strategic bombing campaign against Germany. This mission was the starting point for the first Distinguished Unit Citation (DUC) awarded to the squadron for its sustained actions through the end of July 1944. Targets included industrial sites, oil refineries, storage plants, submarine pens, airfields and communications centers in Germany, France, the Netherlands, Belgium, Norway and Poland. Targets included a chemical plant in Ludwigshafen, an aircraft assembly plant in Braunschweig, ball bearing plants at Schweinfurt and Leipzig, synthetic oil refineries at Merseburg and Gelsenkirchen, marshalling yards at Hamm and Reims and airfields in le Mesnil-au-Val and Berlin.

On 20 December 1943, a B-17 of the squadron was involved in an encounter with a Bf 109 that came to light in the late 1980s—the German fighter pilot, Franz Stigler, held his fire to allow the damaged B-17 and its injured crew to return to England.

The squadron received a second DUC for its attack on the Focke-Wulf Fw 190 aircraft factory at Oschersleben and the Junkers factory at Halberstadt on 11 January 1944. The programmed fighter escort encountered prohibitive weather, as did two of the three divisions making the attack. However, weather in the east was sufficiently clear that the Luftwaffe was able to assemble the largest interceptor force to oppose an attack for the preceding three months. However, the squadron flew into enemy territory without fighter escort to complete its mission.

The squadron was occasionally diverted from the strategic bombing campaign to perform close air support and interdiction missions. It supported Operation Crossbow by attacking V-1 flying bomb and V-2 rocket launch sites. It bombed airfields, radar stations and other installations to prepare for Operation Overlord, the Normandy invasion in June 1944. On D-Day, it bombed defended positions just ahead of the Allied landings and struck airfields, rail choke points, and gun emplacements during the campaign that followed.

During the Northern France Campaign, the squadron bombed enemy positions to assist ground troops during Operation Cobra, the breakout at Saint Lo on 24 and 25 July 1944. It attacked German communications and fortifications during the Battle of the Bulge, from December 1944 through January 1945 and bombed bridges and viaducts in France and Germany to aid the Allied assault across the Rhine, from February to March 1945. The squadron flew its last mission on 25 April 1945.

After V-E Day the squadron was detailed for the Green Project, which called for moving 50,000 American troops back to the United States each month. The squadron moved to Casablanca Airfield, French Morocco, but in June, Air Transport Command decided to use its own, more flexible organization (Note: Air Transport Command had reorganized its overseas units under the AAF Base Unit System in 1944. See Goss, p. 75 for the reasons for this reorganization.) for the project and the squadron was inactivated on 25 July 1945.

=== Strategic Air Command ===
From 1958, the Boeing B-47 Stratojet wings of Strategic Air Command (SAC) began to assume an alert posture at their home bases, reducing the amount of time spent on alert at overseas bases. The SAC alert cycle divided itself into four parts: planning, flying, alert and rest to meet General Thomas S. Power's initial goal of maintaining one third of SAC's planes on fifteen minute ground alert, fully fueled and ready for combat to reduce vulnerability to a Soviet missile strike. To implement this new system B-47 wings reorganized from three to four squadrons. The 527th was activated at Homestead Air Force Base as the fourth squadron of the 379th Bombardment Wing. The 379th Wing became nonoperational in October 1960 in preparation for conversion to the Boeing B-52H Stratofortress, and the squadron was inactivated on 9 January 1961.

== Lineage ==
- Constituted as the 527th Bombardment Squadron (Heavy) on 28 October 1942

Activated on 3 November 1942
Redesignated 527th Bombardment Squadron, Heavy c. 20 August 1943
Inactivated on 25 July 1945
Redesignated 527th Bombardment Squadron, Medium on 20 August 1958
Activated on 1 November 1958
Discontinued on 9 January 1961

=== Assignments ===
- 379th Bombardment Group, 3 November 1942 – 25 July 1945
- 379th Bombardment Wing, 1 November 1958 – 9 January 1961

=== Stations ===
- Geiger Field, Washington, 3 November 1942
- Wendover Field, Utah, 2 December 1942
- Sioux City Army Air Base, Iowa, 2 February–9 April 1943
- RAF Kimbolton (AAF-117), England, 20 May 1943 – 12 June 1945
- Casablanca Airfield, French Morocco, 17 June–25 July 1945
- Homestead Air Force Base, Florida, 1 November 1958 – 9 January 1961

=== Aircraft ===
- Boeing B-17 Flying Fortress, 1942–1945
- Boeing B-47E Stratojet, 1958–1961

=== Awards and campaigns ===
Award streamer	Award	Dates	Notes
	Distinguished Unit Citation	29 May 1943-31 July 1944	Continental Europe
	Distinguished Unit Citation	11 January 1944	Germany

Campaign Streamer	Campaign	Dates	Notes
	Air Offensive, Europe	21 May 1943 – 5 June 1944	
	Air Combat, EAME Theater	21 May 1943 – 11 May 1945	
	Normandy	6 June 1944 – 24 July 1944	
	Northern France	25 July 1944 – 14 September 1944	
	Rhineland	15 September 1944 – 21 March 1945	
	Ardennes-Alsace	16 December 1944 – 25 January 1945	
	Central Europe	22 March 1945 – 21 May 1945	

== See also ==
- List of B-47 units of the United States Air Force
- B-17 Flying Fortress units of the United States Army Air Forces
