= Adam Makos =

American author and historian

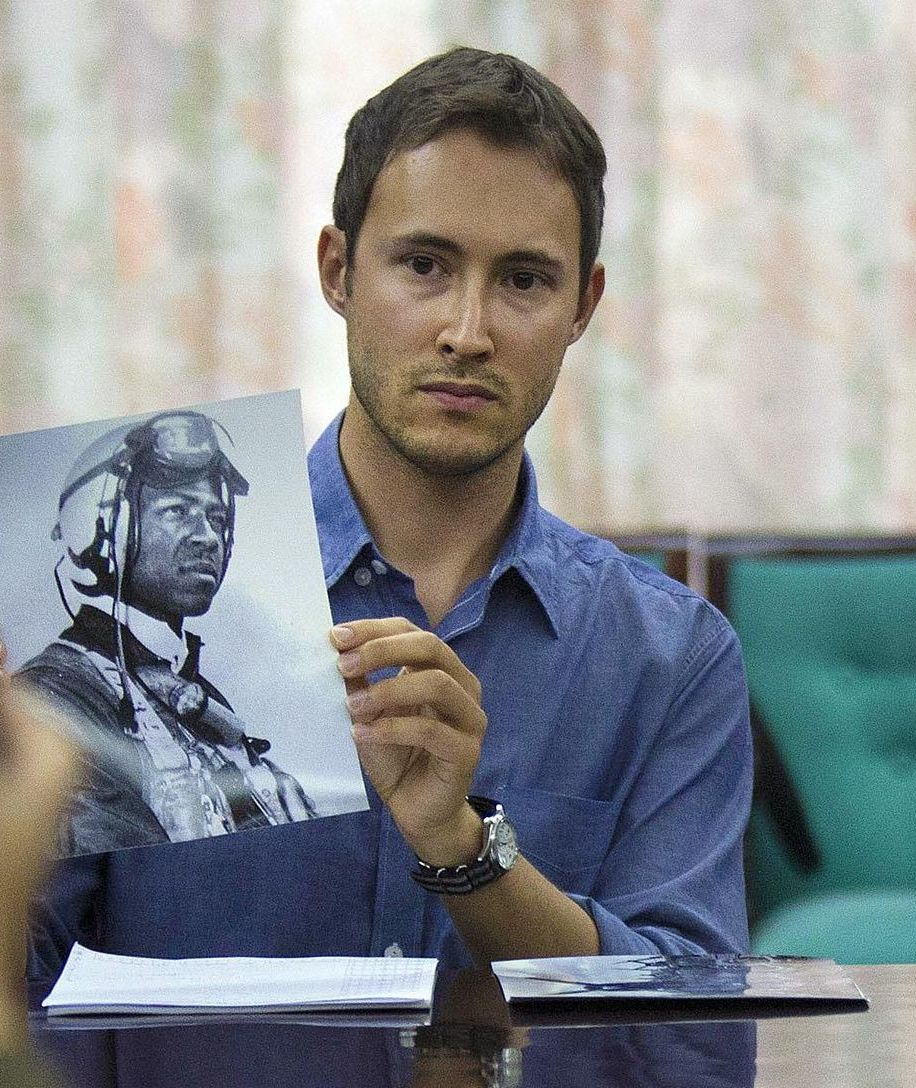
- Adam Makos (2013)
- Born: 1981 (age 44–45)
- Education: Montoursville Area High School; Lycoming College
- Writing career
- Genre: Military history
- Notable works: A Higher Call (2012); Devotion (2015); Spearhead (2019)
- Website: Official website

Adam Makos (born 1981) is an American author and military historian. His works include A Higher Call (2012), which recounts the Charlie Brown and Franz Stigler incident, and Spearhead (2019), a detailed biography of World War II tank gunner Clarence Smoyer. Both books have appeared on the New York Times Best Seller list. The 2022 film, Devotion, is based on his 2015 book of the same title, which tells the true story of a friendship between two U.S. Navy pilots in the Korean War.

At the age of 15 years, while in high school, he started to write military history and was one of the founding members of Ghost Wings, a forerunner to Valor, a magazine depicting veterans' stories.

His other works include Voices of the Pacific (2013), based on a collection of oral histories of marines and seamen who served in the Pacific during the Second World War.

== Early life and education ==
Adam Makos was brought up on the outskirts of Williamsport, Pennsylvania. He completed his early education from Montoursville Area High School. At the age of 15 years, while in high school, he started to write military history and was one of the founding members of Ghost Wings, a forerunner to Valor, a magazine depicting veterans' stories. He was a member of the school's French club and was signed up for a trip to Paris until opting to go to Walt Disney World with his family. The club's flight to Paris was the fatal TWA Flight 800, which has been a major life changing event for him. In 2003 he graduated from Lycoming College (business-marketing).

== Career ==
In 2012, after eight years of research, Makos published A Higher Call. It recounts the Charlie Brown and Franz Stigler incident. The book was on the New York Times Best Seller list. He subsequently wrote Voices of the Pacific (2013), based on a collection of oral histories of marines and seamen who served in the Pacific during the Second World War.

The 2022 film, Devotion, is based on his 2015 book of the same title, which recounts the true story of a friendship between two U.S. Navy pilots in the Korean War.

In 2019, he published a detailed biography of World War II tank gunner Clarence Smoyer, titled Spearhead. The book made the top five in the New York Times Best Seller list.

== Bibliography ==
- A higher call. Berkley Books. 2012. ISBN 978-0-425-25286-4.
- Voices of the Pacific : untold stories from the Marine heroes of World War II. Berkley Books. 2013. ISBN 9780425257821.
- Devotion : an epic story of heroism, friendship and sacrifice. Atlantic Books. 2015. ISBN 9780593722336.
- Spearhead. Atlantic Books. 2019. ISBN 978-1-78239-578-2.
