= Franz Stigler =

German WWII pilot (1915–2008)

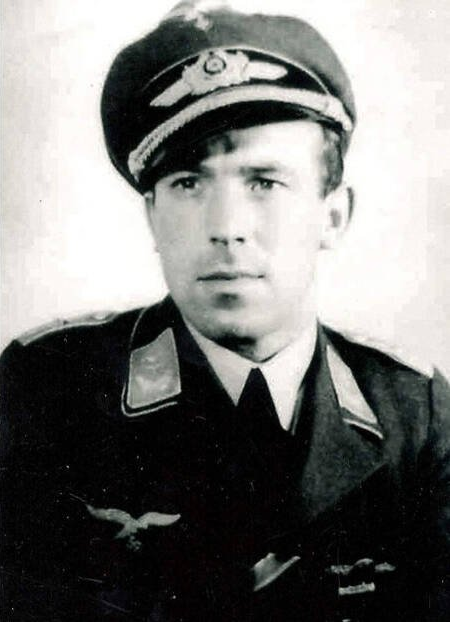
- Oblt. Franz Stigler (c. 1930s-40s)
- Born: Ludwig Franz Stigler; 21 August 1915; Amberg, German Empire
- Died: 22 March 2008 (aged 92); Vancouver, British Columbia, Canada
- Spouse: Hiya Stigler
- Children: 1
- Military career
- Allegiance: Nazi Germany until 1945
- Branch: Luftwaffe (Wehrmacht)
- Service years: 1940–1945
- Rank: Oberleutnant (first lieutenant)
- Nickname: 'Franz'
- Units: JG 27, and JV 44
- Commands: 12./JG 27, 8./JG 27, 11./JG 27, III./JG 27
- Conflicts: World War II; North African Campaign; Defense of the Reich
- Awards: German Cross in Gold; Iron Cross 1st Class; Iron Cross 2nd Class

Ludwig Franz Stigler (21 August 1915 – 22 March 2008) was a German fighter pilot and fighter ace in World War II.

He is best known for his role in a December 1943 incident in which he spared the crew of a severely damaged B-17 bomber. As told by him and reported in "A Higher Call" book, he escorted the plane to safety over enemy lines. The story was kept secret for many years, but in 1990 the two pilots finally reunited and were close friends until their deaths in 2008. Stigler died in Canada, where he moved after the war.

Earlier in the war, Franz Stigler was also a member of the “JG 27 Infamous Schwarm”, a name given to a small team of four pilots of the 4th Staffel of this unit, who claim around 60 claims in July-August 1942, which ultimately appeared fake,

== Early life ==
Ludwig Franz Stigler was born on 21 August 1915 in Amberg, Bavaria. His father was a World War I pilot/observer.

Stigler began flying gliders when he was 12, and in 1933, he piloted a biplane. He flew for Deutsche Luft Hansa (the predecessor of Lufthansa) before joining the Luftwaffe in 1940.

== Military service ==
In the Luftwaffe, Stigler became an instructor pilot. One of his students was Gerhard Barkhorn, who went on to down over 300 planes in combat. Stigler himself flew 487 combat missions, downing 28 planes while himself being shot down 17 times (he bailed out six times and landed in a damaged plane 11 times). His brother, August, who was also a pilot, was killed in the crash of a Junkers Ju 88 in August 1940.

As a member of Jagdgeschwader 27 (JG 27) in North Africa as well as Europe, and of the Jagdverband (JV) 44 jet fighter squadron, the aircraft Stigler flew in combat were the Messerschmitt Bf 109 and Messerschmitt Me 262.

In North Africa, Stigler flew in the Schwarm made up of Oberleutnant Ferdinand Vögl, the commander of 4. Staffel, Oberfeldwebel Karl-Heinz Bendert, Oberfeldwebel Erwin Sawallisch and Stigler. At the time, most of the aerial victories claimed by II. Gruppe were allegedly achieved by pilots of 4. Staffel, of which 63 out 66 claims were attributed to these four pilots alone. In comparison, the claims filed by Vögl, Bendert, Sawallisch and Stigler far exceeded the number of aerial victories claimed by other units of JG 27 and raised significant doubt within the Luftwaffe. This Schwarm of JG 27 was prevented from flying together after 59-kill ace Hans-Arnold Stahlschmidt reported that he saw them shooting into the dunes of the desert during a mission in which they claimed 12 aerial victories. The team was then disbanded; One of the four pilots apparently committed suicide the following day; The scores of all the three other pilots immediately stopped increasing, including for Stigler, who did not add any further victories to the 17 claims he previously claimed with the “Infamous Schwarm.”

On 15 May 1943, Stigler was injured when his Bf 109 G-6 (Werknummer 15371—factory number) suffered engine failure and he was forced to bail out near the Milo Airfield, Sicily.

On 13 January 1944, Stigler was appointed Staffelkapitän (squadron leader) of 12. Staffel of JG 27. He succeeded Oberleutnant Werner Küffner who had been killed in action the day before. The Staffel was subordinated to IV. Gruppe of JG 27 under the command of Hauptmann Otto Meyer. On 13 May, Stigler was transferred and command of 12. Staffel was then given to Oberleutnant Ernst-Wilhelm Reinert. Stigler was then appointed Staffelkapitän of 8. Staffel of JG 27. He succeeded Oberleutnant Kurt Hammel who was transferred. On 15 August, 8. Staffel was renamed to 11. Staffel. When on 1 October, the Gruppenkommandeur (group commander) of III. Gruppe of JG 27, Major Ernst Düllberg, was transferred, Stigler temporarily assumed command of the Gruppe. On 27 October, Stigler was transferred to Ergänzungs-Jagdgeschwader 1. Command of 11. Staffel was then passed to Oberleutnant Karl Kohl while command of the Gruppe went to Oberleutnant Peter Werfft.

== B-17 incident ==
On 20 December 1943, Stigler met a B-17 bomber nicknamed Ye Olde Pub and its American pilot Charles "Charlie" Brown for the first time. As reported by him, Stigler had shot down one B-17s earlier that day (but no trace of this can be found in the German archives (see Aerial victory claims below) ; He soon caught up to a wounded B-17 flown by Brown. Lining up to finish the bomber and shoot it down, he noticed the tail gunner never moved the guns. Upon further inspection of the airplane, he saw through large holes in the fuselage a frantic crew trying to save the lives of their fellow airmen, and decided not to fire.

Stigler is quoted as saying "and for me it would have been the same as shooting at a parachute", in reference to a statement by his commander and mentor Gustav Rödel; "If I hear of one of you shooting a man in a parachute, I'll shoot you myself!". Stigler motioned to Brown to land his airplane in neutral Sweden because of the extensive damage. However, Brown didn't understand and decided to keep flying towards England. Stigler escorted the B-17 and its crew to the North Sea coast, protecting it from German anti-aircraft gunners (who recognized the silhouette of his Bf 109 and held fire). Once they were over water, Stigler saluted Brown, then left to return to base.

However, Stigler's description is not consistent with Brown’s account in the magazine *Jägerblatt* in December 1989, which mentionned an encounter lasting only 1 to 2 minutes; when Stigler spoke about an escort of 120 to 150 km, which correspond to 20 minutes flight.

Again, the German records (see Aerial victory claims list below) show no trace of any claim reports for the day of Dec. 20th, 1943, when all other Stigler's claims during the war are duly recorded, which lead to some doubt about Stigler's real presence in the "mercy story" and escort of the B-17.

=== Aftermath ===
Stigler never spoke of the incident as he could have been court-martialed and executed. Stigler moved to Canada in 1953 and became a successful businessman. He was married twice, and had a daughter from his first marriage; his second lasted until his death. Brown told his commanding officers, who chose to keep the incident secret. Years later, in 1990, Brown searched for the German pilot who let them live that day; Stigler answered this pilot was him, and gave exactly the same details that Brown had published few months earlier in Jägerblatt magazine...; However the two pilots, along with the surviving Pub crew, met face to face, half a century later.

Between 1990 and 2008, Brown and Stigler became close friends and remained so until their deaths within several months of each other in 2008. (Note: Charles L. Brown’s obituary discusses the incident with Stigler and describes their friendship.)

In 2014, a Swedish heavy metal band called Sabaton wrote a song in English about this incident, titled "No Bullets Fly".

== Summary of career ==
=== Aerial victory claims ===
Mathews and Foreman, authors of Luftwaffe Aces — Biographies and Victory Claims, researched the German Federal Archives and found records for 26 aerial victory claims, plus one further unconfirmed claim. All of his aerial victories were claimed over the Western Allies on the Western Front or in North Africa and include five four-engined heavy bombers.

It is possible this list is short by a few victories, since records of last months of the war are missing.

Chronicle of aerial victories
This and the – (dash) indicates unconfirmed aerial victory claims for which Stigler did not receive credit. This along with the * (asterisk) indicates an Herausschuss (separation shot)—a severely damaged heavy bomber forced to separate from his combat box which was counted as an aerial victory. This and the ? (question mark) indicates information discrepancies listed by Prien, Balke, Stemmer, Rodeike, Bock, Mathews and Foreman.
Claim	Date	Time	Type	Location	Unit	Claim	Date	Time	Type	Location	Unit
– Claims with II. Gruppe of Jagdgeschwader 27 – In North Africa — February – 6 December 1942
1	31 May 1942	06:23	P-40	southwest of Fort Acroma	4./JG 27	10	10 August 1942	08:33	Hurricane	north-northeast of Deir el-Muhafid	4./JG 27
2	26 June 1942	18:57	P-40	south of Mersa Matruh	4./JG 27	11	11 August 1942	10:13	Hurricane	south of El Hamman	4./JG 27
3	10 July 1942	10:40	Spitfire	north of El Alamein	4./JG 27	12	12 August 1942	06:44? (Note: According to Mathews and Foreman claimed at 06:45.)	Hurricane	south-southeast of El Alamein	4./JG 27
4	17 July 1942	13:24	P-40	south of El Alamein	4./JG 27	13	12 August 1942	06:53	Hurricane	south of Alam-el-Kadim	4./JG 27
5	23 July 1942	18:15	Spitfire	east of El Alamein	4./JG 27	14	12 August 1942	07:03	P-40	southwest of Alam el Halfa	4./JG 27
6	6 August 1942	12:04	P-40	east of Deir-el-Abiad	4./JG 27	15	16 August 1942	08:28	P-40	south of Alam-el-Kadim	4./JG 27
7	7 August 1942	09:14	Hurricane	southeast of Alam-el-Kadim	4./JG 27	16	16 August 1942	08:38	Hurricane	south-southwest of El Hamman	4./JG 27
8	7 August 1942	09:20	Hurricane	east-northeast of Alam-el-Kadim	4./JG 27	17	22 August 1942	07:31	Spitfire	south-southwest of Alam Uzeiligh	4./JG 27
9	10 August 1942	08:32	P-40	north of Deir el-Muhafid	4./JG 27						
– Claims with II. Gruppe of Jagdgeschwader 27 – Sicily, Tunisia and Italy — February – July 1943
18	16 April 1943	17:03	P-38	70 km (43 mi) west Marettimo	6./JG 27	19	17 July 1943	08:25	Spitfire	northwest of Augusta	6./JG 27
– Claims with II. Gruppe of Jagdgeschwader 27 – Defense of the Reich — September – November 1943
20	6 September 1943	11:00	B-17	10 km (6.2 mi) south of Bad Urach	6./JG 27	21	29 November 1943	15:25? (Note: According to Mathews and Foreman claimed at 15:56.)	B-17	15 km (9.3 mi) southwest of Wilhelmshaven; 3 km (1.9 mi) northwest of Harpstedt	6./JG 27
— ? (Note: According to Mathews and Foreman, this claim is confirmed.)	29 November 1943	15:04	B-17*	3 km (1.9 mi) southwest of Wilhelmshaven	6./JG 27						
– Claims with IV. Gruppe of Jagdgeschwader 27 – Defense of the Reich — 13 January – 12 May 1944
22	19 March 1944	13:46	B-24	south of Marburg an der Drau	12./JG 27	24	3 April 1944	10:55	P-38	2 km (1.2 mi) west of Dunavecse	12./JG 27
23	19 March 1944	14:14	B-24	northwest of Cirkulane south of Marburg	12./JG 27	—	24 April 1944	—	P-51		12./JG 27
– Claims with III. Gruppe of Jagdgeschwader 27 – In defense of the Normandy Invasion — June – August 1944
25	16 August 1944	17:06	Spitfire	2 km (1.2 mi) northeast of Orphin	11./JG 27						

=== Awards ===
- Honor Goblet of the Luftwaffe on 28 February 1944 as Oberfeldwebel and pilot
- German Cross in Gold on 1 October 1944 as Leutnant in a Jagdgeschwader
