= RAF Kimbolton =

UK Royal Air Force airbase in Cambridgeshire

RAF Kimbolton USAAF Station 117
- Huntingdon, Cambridgeshire in England
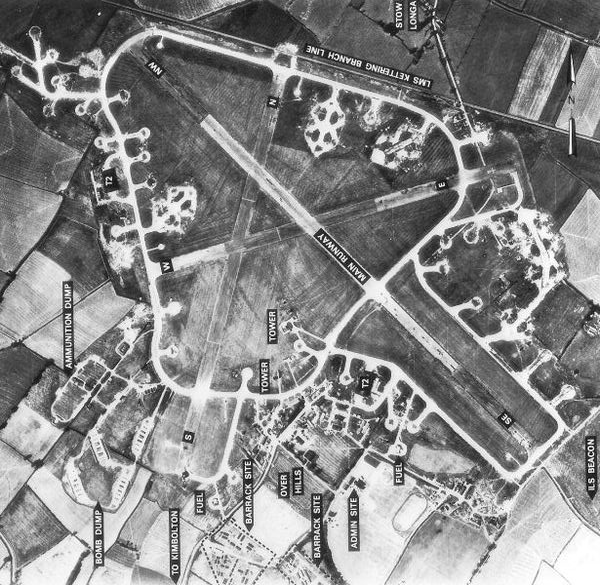
- Aerial Photo of Kimbolton Airfield - 10 August 1945

Site information
- Type: Royal Air Force station
- Code: KI
- Owner: Air Ministry
- Operator: Royal Air Force; United States Army Air Forces
- Controlled by: RAF Bomber Command * No. 1 Group RAF; Eighth Air Force

Location
- Shown within Cambridgeshire RAF Kimbolton (the United Kingdom)
- Coordinates: 52°18′53″N 0°22′59″W

Site history
- Built: 1940/41
- In use: November 1941 - 1946
- Battles/wars: European theatre of World War II; Air Offensive, Europe July 1942 - May 1945

Airfield information
- Elevation: 73 metres (240 ft) AMSL
Runways
Direction	Length and surface
00/00	Concrete/Asphalt
00/00	Concrete/Asphalt
00/00	Concrete/Asphalt

Royal Air Force Kimbolton or more simply RAF Kimbolton is a former Royal Air Force station located 8 miles (13 km) west of Huntingdon, Cambridgeshire, England.

== History ==
=== USAAF use ===
The airfield was originally built in 1941 for RAF Bomber Command, then expanded to Class A airfield standards for use by American heavy bombers during 1942. Kimbolton was assigned to the United States Army Air Forces (USAAF) Eighth Air Force. It was given the designation USAAF Station 117.

The airfield was used by No. 460 Squadron RAAF between November 1941 and January 1942 with the Vickers Wellington IV.

==== 91st Bombardment Group (Heavy) ====
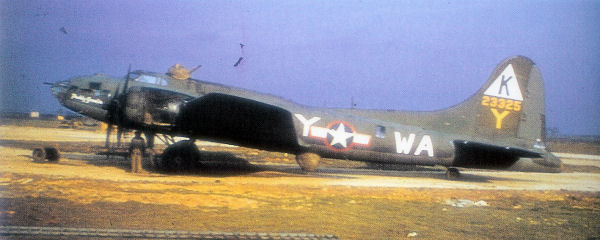
Douglas-Long Beach B-17F-45-DL Fortress AAF Ser. No. 42-3325 524th BS, "Paddy Gremlin".

The airfield was opened in 1942 and was first used by the USAAF Eighth Air Force 91st Bombardment Group (Heavy), arriving from Walla Walla AAF, Washington during September.

The 91st was assigned to the 1st Combat Bombardment Wing of the 1st Bombardment Division. Its tail code was Triangle-A. Its operational Boeing B-17 Flying Fortress squadrons were:

- 322d Bombardment Squadron (LG)
- 323d Bombardment Squadron (OR)
- 324th Bombardment Squadron (DF)
- 401st Bombardment Squadron (LL)

The 91st stayed at Kimbolton only a few weeks, because the runways at Kimbolton were not strong or long enough for the safe operation of Fortresses. The group transferred to RAF Bassingbourn on 14 October.

==== 17th Bombardment Group (Medium) ====
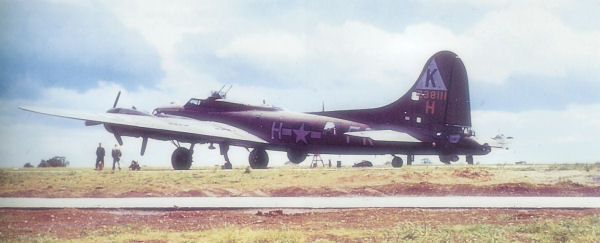
Douglas-Long Beach B-17G-30-DL Fortress AAF Ser. No. 42-38111 525th BS.

The next USAAF unit to use Kimbolton was the 17th Bombardment Group (Medium), arriving in October from Barksdale AAF Louisiana. The 17th was originally intended to use RAF Bassingbourn. However, with the move of the 91st, the unit utilised Kimbolton as its shorter runways could accommodate their smaller, twin-engined medium bombers.

The 17th consisted of the following squadrons:

- 34th Bombardment Squadron
- 37th Bombardment Squadron
- 95th Bombardment Squadron
- 432d Bombardment Squadron

The 17th flew the Martin B-26 Marauder medium bomber, and used Kimbolton as a transitory airfield on its way to the North African campaign. The Group departed in November for Telergma, Algeria, with its last elements leaving in early December. With the departure of the B-26s, extensions were made to the NW-SE runway to facilitate the operation of fully loaded B-17s.

==== 379th Bombardment Group (Heavy) ====
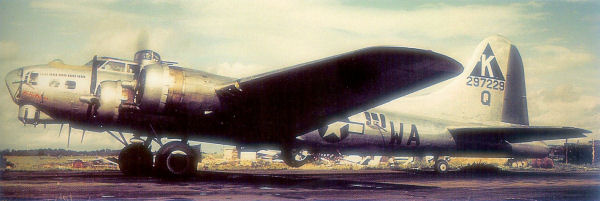
Boeing B-17G-45-BO Fortress AAF Ser. No. 42-97229 524th BS, "Hi Ho Silver".

On 21 May 1943, the 379th Bombardment Group (Heavy) arrived from Sioux City AAF, Iowa.

The 379th was assigned to the 41st Combat Bombardment Wing of the 1st Bombardment Division. Its tail code was Triangle-K. Its operational B-17 Flying Fortress squadrons were:

- 524th Bombardment Squadron (WA)
- 525th Bombardment Squadron (FR)
- 526th Bombardment Squadron (LF)
- 527th Bombardment Squadron (FO)

The 379th BG began operations with Eighth AF on 19 May 1943, and received a Distinguished Unit Citation for operations over Europe from May 1943 through July 1944. The group engaged primarily in bombardment of strategic targets such as industries, oil refineries, storage plants, submarine pens, airfields and communications centres in Germany, France, the Netherlands, Belgium, Norway and Poland.

Specific targets included a chemical plant in Ludwigshafen, an aircraft assembly plant in Brunswick, ball-bearing plants at Schweinfurt and Leipzig, synthetic oil refineries at Merseburg and Gelsenkirchen, marshalling yards at Hamm and Reims and airfields in Mesnil au Val and Berlin.

The Group received another DUC for flying without fighter protection into central Germany to attack vital aircraft factories on 11 January 1944. On several occasions the Group attacked interdictory targets and operated in support of ground forces. It bombed V-weapon sites, airfields, radar stations and other installations before the Normandy invasion in June 1944, bombed defended positions just ahead of the Allied landings on 6 June and struck airfields, rail choke points, and gun emplacements during the campaign that followed.

During the Battle of France, the Group bombed enemy positions to assist ground troops at St Lo during the breakthrough, 24–25 July 1944, attacked German communications and fortifications during the Battle of the Bulge, December 1944 - January 1945, and bombed bridges and viaducts in France and Germany to aid the Allied assault across the Rhine, February–March 1945.

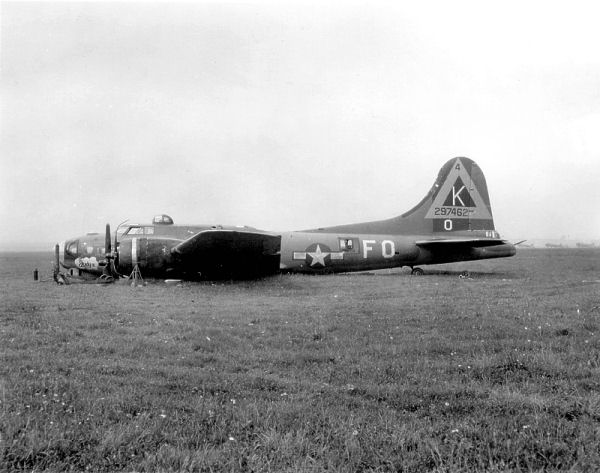
Lockheed/Vega B-17G-15-VE Flying Fortress AAF Serial No. 42-97462 of the 527th Bomb Squadron after a belly landing. This aircraft was repaired and returned to combat duty.

The combat record of the 379th was the most successful of all the Eighth Air Force heavy bomber groups. It held records as far as bomb tonnage dropped — 26,459 tons — more than any other unit including those operational before the 379th arrived in the UK. It also exceeded all other UK Bomb Groups in the total number of missions flown, carrying out 330 between May 1943 and 15 May 1945. Two of the 524th Squadron B-17's claimed individual fame: "Ole Gappy" (or "Ol' Gappy") completed 157 missions (with just one abort), probably more than any other Eighth Air Force bomber; and "Swamp Fire" was the first heavy bomber to achieve 100 missions without an abort, with Lt Bruce E. Mills as the pilot of that mission.

According to Lt Baine A. Hawthorne, who was a pilot of A/C 42-40003, "Ol' Gappy" was the name of just the chin turret. The name was painted on the chin turret as a joke toward a crew chief with a space between his front teeth (reference the space between the two machine guns in the chin turret). The aircraft was actually named "Topper" after a then-famous movie character. The nose art was unfinished (top hat, white bow tie and white gloves) due to interruptions in painting because of the mission schedule. After some time had passed, and "Topper" kept coming home, the crews thought it would be bad luck to complete the nose art, including adding the correct name. "Topper" was cut up and sold for scrap after the war.

After V-E Day, the 379th Bomb Group was transferred to Casablanca, French Morocco, during June 1945. The unit was inactivated in Morocco during July.

=== Postwar military use ===
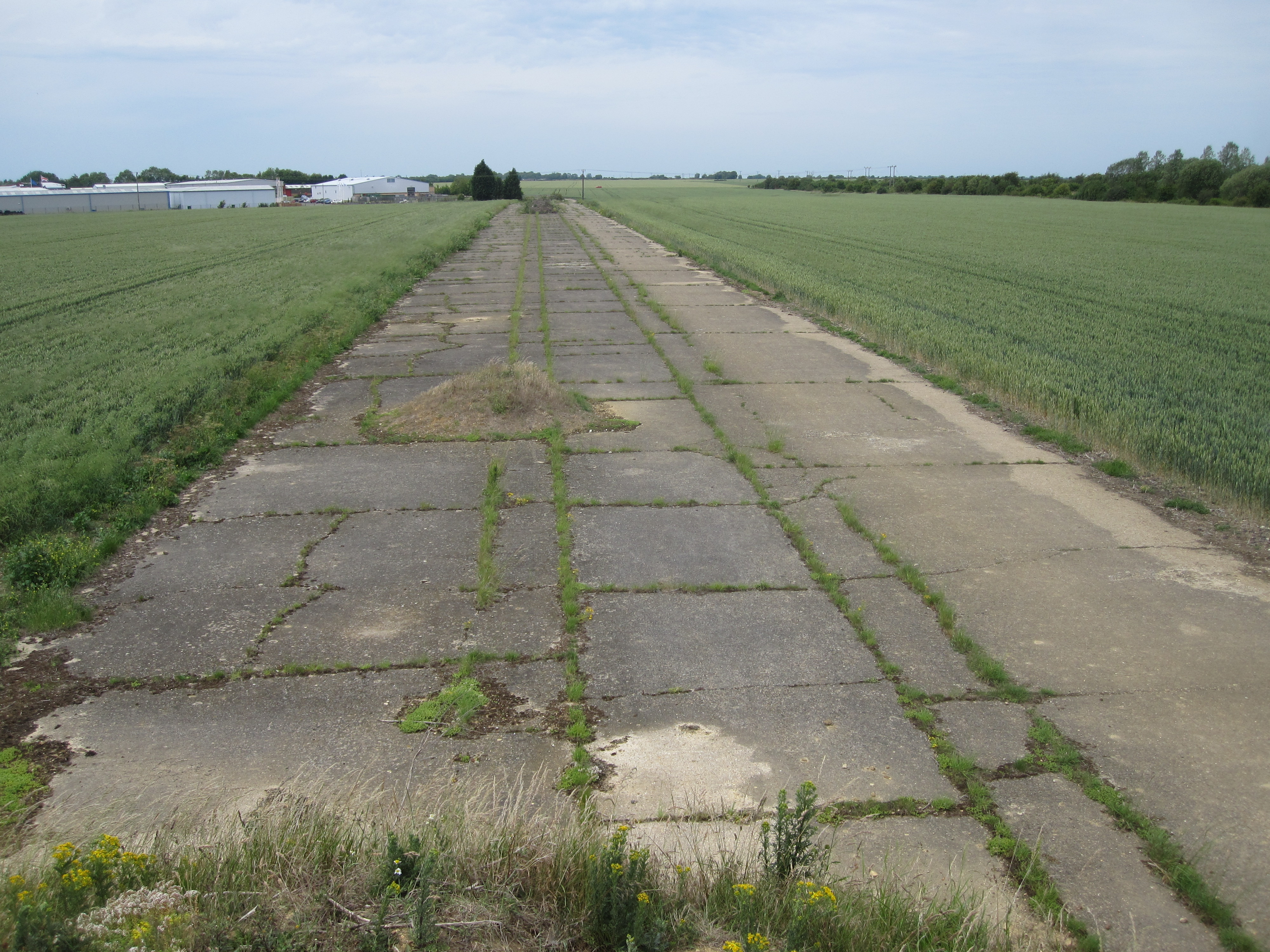
Taxiway at RAF Kimbolton in 2011

After the Second World War, RAF Kimbolton closed in 1946 but was maintained with a "standby" status until the early 1960s. After the Americans left, the RAF used the camp for basic training (square bashing) and many hundreds of conscripts trained there before it finally closed. With the end of military control, most of the buildings were torn down and the concrete areas removed. Among the last significant buildings to survive were the airfield's two control towers (one earlier and smaller than the other) which had both become increasingly derelict before they were demolished in 1977.

== Current use ==
Some parts of the old hard-standings have been used for go-kart racing since 1959. The Hunts Kart Racing club's flag is the 379th "Triangle K" symbol. In one of the buildings at the kart track, there is a collection of memorabilia including photographs and pieces of aircraft wreckage. Once a month, MSUK Kart Race Meetings are held there.

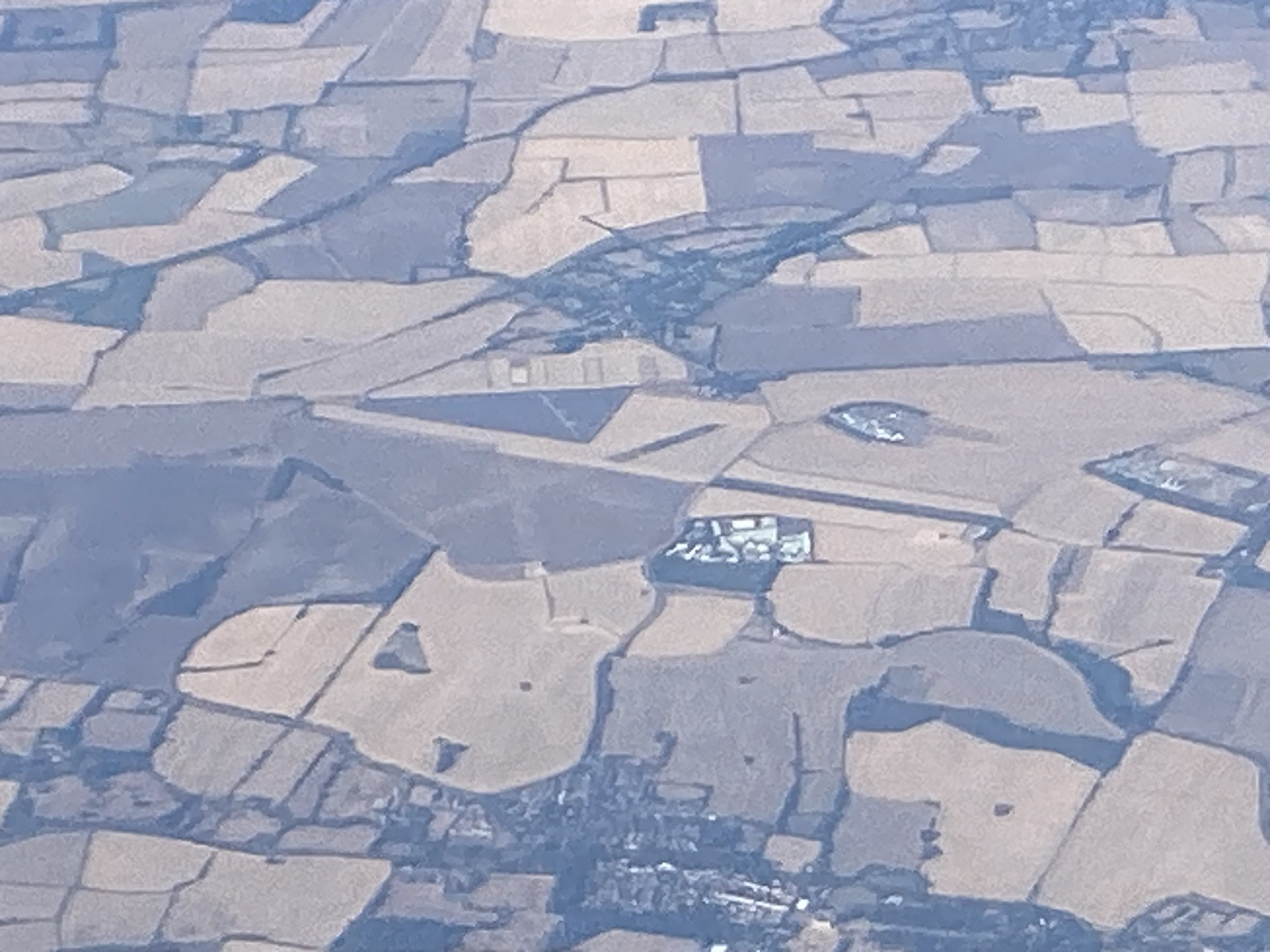
RAF Kimbolton (August, 2026)

Today, the B-road which connects the village of Stow Longa to the town of Kimbolton crosses over the remains of RAF Kimbolton's main runway with its crumbling concrete visible just past the shoulder of the road. Additionally, a public footpath crosses the main area where one of the two control towers once stood, the foundations of which are still recognisable among the farmland.

On weekends, "banger racing" was formerly held on one of the old loop hardstands.

== See also ==
- List of former Royal Air Force stations
