= Global Information Grid-Bandwidth Expansion =

The Global Information Grid Bandwidth Expansion (GIG-BE) Program was a major United States Department of Defense (DOD) net-centric transformational initiative executed by DISA. Part of the Global Information Grid project, GIG-BE created a ubiquitous "bandwidth-available" environment to improve national security intelligence, surveillance and reconnaissance, information assurance, as well as command and control. Through GIG-BE, DISA leveraged DOD's existing end-to-end information transport capabilities, significantly expanding capacity and reliability to select Joint Staff-approved locations worldwide. GIG-BE achieved Full Operational Capability (FOC) on December 20, 2005.

== Scope ==
This program provided increased bandwidth and diverse physical access to approximately 87 critical sites in the continental United States (CONUS), US Pacific Command (PACOM) and US European Command (EUCOM). These locations are interconnected via an expanded GIG core.

== Capabilities and services ==
GIG-BE provides a secure, robust, optical terrestrial network that delivers very high-speed classified and unclassified Internet Protocol (IP) services to key operating locations worldwide. The Assistant Secretary of Defense for Networks and Information Integration's (ASD/NII) vision is a "color to every base," physically diverse network access, optical mesh upgrades for the backbone network, and regional/MAN upgrades, where needed. "A color to every base" implies that every site has an OC-192 (10 gigabits per second) of usable IP dedicated to that site.

== Implementation ==
After extensive component integration and operational testing, implementation began in the middle of the 2004 fiscal year and extended through calendar year 2005. The initial implementation concentrated on six sites used during the proof of Initial Operational Capability (IOC), achieved on September 30, 2004. The GIG-BE Program Office conducted detailed site surveys at all of the approximately 87 Joint Staff-approved locations and parallel implementation in CONUS and overseas. The GIG-BE Program Office completed the Final Operational Test and Evaluation (FOT&E) at 54 operational sites on October 7, 2005. On December 20, 2005, the GIG-BE program achieved the milestone of Full Operational Capability.

== Contract ==
GIG-BE was awarded to SAIC in 2001 for $877 million. This contract was for the development, instantiation, and maintenance of the GIG-BE network. SAIC instantly divided the equipment and tasks into subcontracts. These subcontracts are as follows:

- Ciena Corporation- optical transport segment worth $200-$300 million over two years
- Sycamore Networks- optical cross-connect segment worth $100-$150 million
- Cisco Systems- multiservice provisioning platform segment worth $150-$200 million
- Juniper Networks- core IP router portion worth $150-$200 million
- By Light- installation and maintenance worth $100-$150 million

== Congressional critic ==
Representatives Marty Meehan (D-Mass) and Jim Saxton (R-NJ) expressed concern in the selection process for a contractor to lead the GIG-BE effort. They say it was handled "irresponsibly." The reason for this as expressed by Meehan's spokesperson Kimberly Abbott is the "whole bidding process wasn't as fair and open as it could have been", because a contractor and not the government led the decision process. SAIC won the contract who eventually handed a large subset of the engineering to By Light. Meehan did stress that he is not questioning the competence of the winners. These two congressman delivered a letter to the DoD regarding the contract but the issue was slowly forgotten.

== See also ==
- Department of Defense Architecture Framework
- DoD Joint Technical Framework version 6.0
- DoD Business Enterprise Architecture
- Global Information Grid-Enterprise Services initiative
- Department Of Defense Directive (DoDD) 8100.01 "Global Information Grid - Overarching Policy", September 2002
- JTF-Global Network Operations
- Global Information Grid
