= NetOps =

NetOps is defined as the operational framework consisting of three essential tasks, Situational Awareness (SA), and Command & Control (C2) that the Commander (CDR) of US Strategic Command (USSTRATCOM), in coordination with DoD and Global NetOps Community, employs to operate, manage and defend the Global Information Grid (GIG) to ensure information superiority for the United States.

DoD Instruction (DoDI) 8410.02 defines NetOps as the DoD-wide operational, organizational, and technical capabilities for operating and defending the Global Information Grid. NetOps includes, but is not limited to, enterprise management, net assurance, and content management. NetOps provides Combatant Commanders (COCOMs) with GIG Situational Awareness to make informed Command and Control decisions. GIG SA is gained through the operational and technical integration of enterprise management and defense actions and activities across all levels of command (strategic, operational and expeditionary forces).

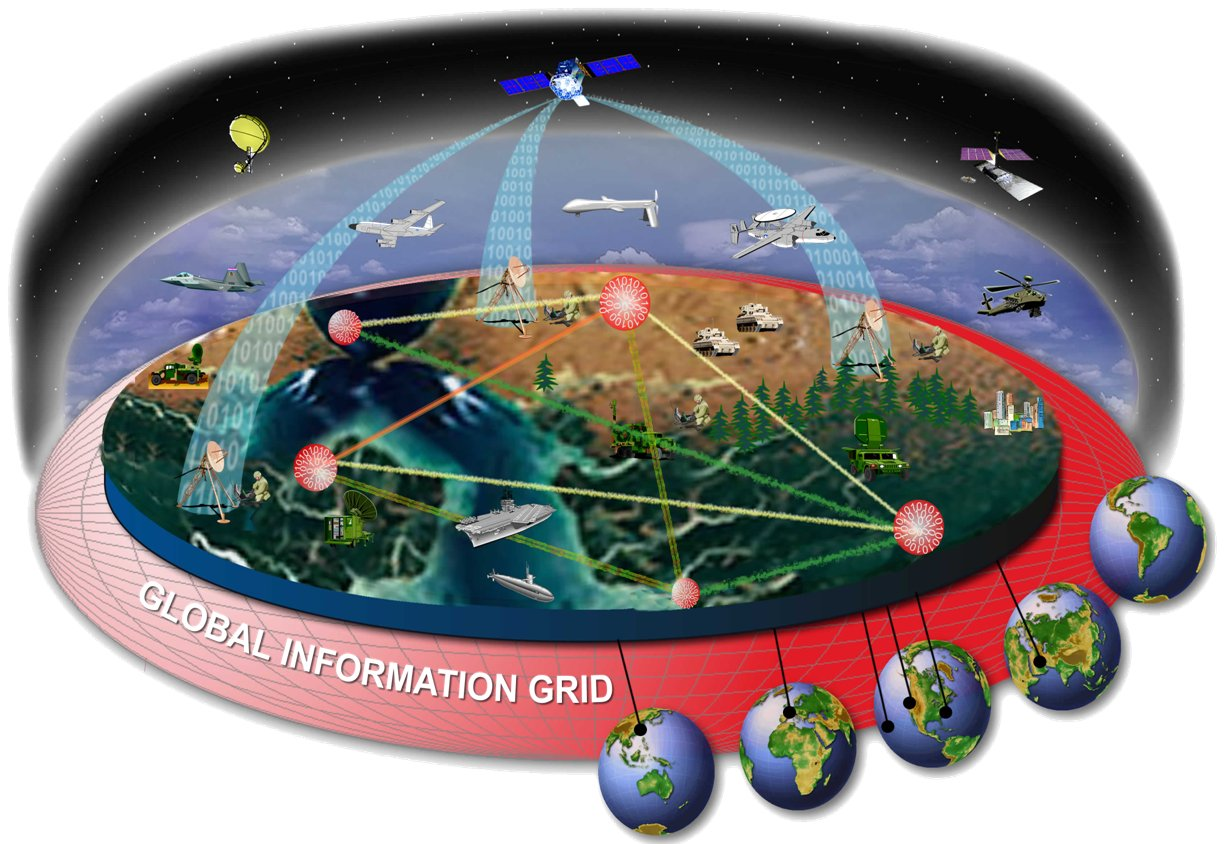
The GIG includes any DoD system, equipment, software, or service that transmits, stores, or processes DoD information, and any other associated services necessary to achieve information superiority.

The three essential tasks are as follows:

- GIG Enterprise Management (GEM)
- GIG Net Assurance (GNA)
- GIG Content Management (GCM)

The synergy achieved by each integrated relationship between any two of the essential tasks (GEM, GNA, and GCM) produces the following NetOps desired effects in support of the overall goal of NetOps which is to provide the right information to the edge:

- Assured System and Network Availability
- Assured Information Protection
- Assured Information Delivery

The element of NetOps known as Situational Awareness (SA), is the primary ability to improve the quality and timeliness of collaborative decision-making. To be effective, much of the SA must be shared in near-real-time by the decision-makers who have the ability to take this information, conduct critical analysis and act on those decisions with regards to employment, protection and defense of the GIG.

This shared Situational Awareness is derived from common reporting requirements using functionally standardized management tools and common data information exchange formats across the Defense Department. These capabilities collect (or receive), and fuse (enterprise management, network defense and configuration management) data in a real time or near real-time fashion to produce defined views of the mission critical GIG information of concern to a commander or NetOps center.

The DoD NetOps Community strives to obtain common visibility of network resources so that these can be managed, anticipate and mitigate problems, ensuring uninterrupted availability and protection of the GIG and provide for graceful degradation, self-healing, failover, diversity, and elimination of critical failure points. Through effective visibility, the NetOps community endeavors to attain the three goals of NetOps: Assured System and Network Availability, Assured Information Protection and Assured Information Delivery.

== Joint Task Force Global Network Operations (JTF-GNO) ==
JTF-GNO directs the operation and defense of the GIG to assure timely and secure Net-Centric capabilities across strategic, operational, and expeditionary boundaries in support of full spectrum warfighting, intelligence, and business missions for the Defense Department.

== Background ==
In 1998, the Department of Defense (DoD) recognized a growing cyber threat and in response created the Joint Task Force — Computer Network Defense (JTF-CND), which achieved Initial Operational Capability (IOC) on 30 December 1998 and Full Operational Capability (FOC) by June 1999.

In the fall of 2000, in accordance with DoD doctrine, JTF-CND became the Joint Task Force — Computer Network Operations (JTF-CNO). In October 2002, the new Unified Command Plan (UCP), Change 2, re-aligned JTF-CNO under the United States Strategic Command (USSTRATCOM).

The JTF-CNO began its largest and most comprehensive transformation in April 2004 when the Commander of US Strategic Command approved the Joint Concept of Operations for GIG Network Operations. This “NetOps CONOPS” provided the common framework and command and control structure to conduct the USSTRATCOM Unified Command Plan (UCP) - assigned mission of Global Network Operations (NETOPS), combining the disciplines of Enterprise Systems (EM) and Network Management (NM), Computer Network Defense (CND), and Information Dissemination Management (IDM).

The secretary of defense signed a delegation of authority letter on 18 June 2004, designating the Director, DISA as the new Commander of the Joint Task Force-Global Network Operations (JTF-GNO). With this designation, the new command assumed the responsibility for directing the operation and defense of the GIG.

This transformation enhanced the JTF GNO's mission and objectives in achieving the Joint Vision 2020 Objective Force and the evolving concept of Net-Centricity.

As new concepts such as network-centric warfare and Joint Vision 2010 arrived in the mid 1990s, it became clear that the center of gravity for U.S. military warfighting capability was shifting towards the network. A corresponding capability was required to move beyond managing the network as a back-office system into a domain of warfighting.

NetOps was originally developed under the leadership of then United States Pacific Command J6 Brigadier General James Bryan during the stand-up of the USCINCPAC Theater C4I Coordination Center (TCCC) at Camp H. M. Smith, Hawaii in 1999. The TCCC initiative was constructed of two distinct components - the technology that formed the vision of the GIG and the NetOps initiative; and the partnerships that made it a reality.

Through its working relationships with DISA, the Service Components, Sub-Unified Commands, JTFs, other CINC TCCC's, and the Joint Staff, USCINCPAC TCCC made the initial strides towards achieving Information Superiority and true enterprise-level processes. The USCINCPAC TCCC was a pilot program for the Assistant Secretary of Defense for Command, Control, Communications, and Intelligence (ASD/C3I) NetOps concept. The NetOps concept began with the development of the architectural framework for NetOps, and a USCINCPAC developed Concept of Operations (CONOPS) outlining the key players and their roles and responsibilities necessary to develop the NetOps construct in the Pacific Theater.

The original NetOps construct consisted of Network Management (NM), Information Assurance (IA), and Information Dissemination Management (IDM). Today the construct has evolved into GIG Enterprise Management (GEM), GIG Net Assurance(GNA), and GIG Content Management which roughly equates to the intent of the original NetOps concept.

== NetOps Vision ==
“We must change the paradigm in which we talk and think about the network; we must ‘fight’ rather than ‘manage’ the network and operators must see themselves as engaged at all times, ensuring the health and operation of this critical weapons system.” Donald Rumsfeld, United States Secretary of Defense (2001 - 2006)

"The US government and the US military must become still more joint, more agile, more decentralized, more networked, and better arranged to share information and coordinate actions." Donald Rumsfeld, United States Secretary of Defense (2001 - 2006)

“This version of the NetOps CONOPS documents the lessons learned by Joint Task Force-Global Network Operations (JTF-GNO) and the NetOps community through operations, exercises, and other events. We will continue to work with the NetOps Community as we translate the concepts set forth in this document into doctrine, policy and joint tactics, techniques, and procedures that strengthen the operations and defense of the Global Information Grid in support of warfighter business and intelligence operations.” General James E. Cartwright, Commander, United States Strategic Command(2004- August 2007)

“The Strategic Vision for the JTF GNO is to lead an adaptive force that assures the availability, delivery, and protection of the Global Information Grid. The NetOps framework, effects, and organizational relationships described herein formulate a foundation for the operational future of the GIG, but these will not happen automatically, nor will they occur without significant effort from the entire NetOps Community. Attaining the vision will require cooperation, innovation, and execution from all mission partners and everyone who touches the GIG.” (From "Joint Task Force-Global Network Operations Strategic Plan, An Adaptive Force Ensuring Information Delivery", February 2006. The adaptive force assures availability, delivery and protection of infrastructure, systems, and information.) LtGen Charles E. Croom, Commander, JTF GNO.

There is also a new paradigm shift occurring in NetOps from 1.0 to 2.0, or DevOps. NetOps Transformation is part of a new wave of automation assistance for network operators, and there are a few methodologies out there to help others. One prominent methodology is aptly named DIRE NetOps. It focuses on Documentation, Isolation, Repair, and Escalation to guide the user through the transformation process, ensuring high value tasks are supported with automation.

== Mission ==
The Unified Command Plan (UCP) assigns the Cyber Mission to Commander, US Strategic Command. NetOps falls under the Cyber-Umbrella as a construct to "operate and defend the GIG."

The NetOps mission is to operate and defend the GIG. Unlike many missions with a defined completion date, NetOps has been established as a standing Joint Force mission necessitating dedicated leadership and resources to execute.

NetOps provides assured NetCentric services to the DoD in support of full spectrum of warfighting operations, intelligence, and business missions throughout the GIG enterprises, seamlessly, end-to-end. An objective of NetCentric services is to quickly get information to decision makers, with adequate context, to make better decisions affecting the mission and to project their decisions forward to their forces for action.

If the decision maker is not getting the needed net-centric services, the GIG NetOps community must collaboratively determine who must take action and how information flow can be optimized. This requires NetOps personnel to have a shared SA as well as the technologies, procedures, and collaborative organizational structures to rapidly assess and respond to system and network degradations, outages, or changes in operational priorities. All functions required to most effectively support GIG operations will be holistically managed.

The effectiveness of NetOps will be measured in terms of availability and reliability of net-centric services, across all domains, in adherence to agreed-upon service levels and policies. The method for service assurance in a NetCentric collaborative environment is to establish operational thresholds, compliance monitoring, and a clear understanding of the capabilities between enterprise service/resource providers and consumers through Service Level Agreements (SLAs).

Proper instrumentation of the GIG will enable monitoring of adherence to these SLAs, as well as enable timely decision-making, service prioritization, resource allocation, root cause, and mission impact assessment. Subsequent TTPs and SLAs will be formalized with appropriate implementation policies to enforce compliance.

== See also ==
- Joint Task Force-Global Network Operations
- United States Strategic Command
- United States Cyber Command
- Global Information Network Architecture
- Information Assurance Vulnerability Alert
