= Richard W. Mies =

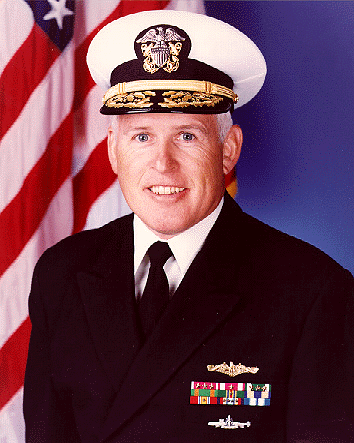
- Born: May 30, 1944 (age 82); Chicago, Illinois, U.S.
- Military career
- Allegiance: United States
- Branch: United States Navy
- Service years: 1967–2002
- Rank: Admiral
- Nickname: Rich/Rick
- Commands: United States Strategic Command; Submarine Group Eight; Submarine Development Squadron Twelve; USS Sea Devil (SSN-664)
- Awards: Defense Distinguished Service Medal; Navy Distinguished Service Medal; Defense Superior Service Medal (2); Legion of Merit (4)
- Other work: President and CEO of Hicks and Associates

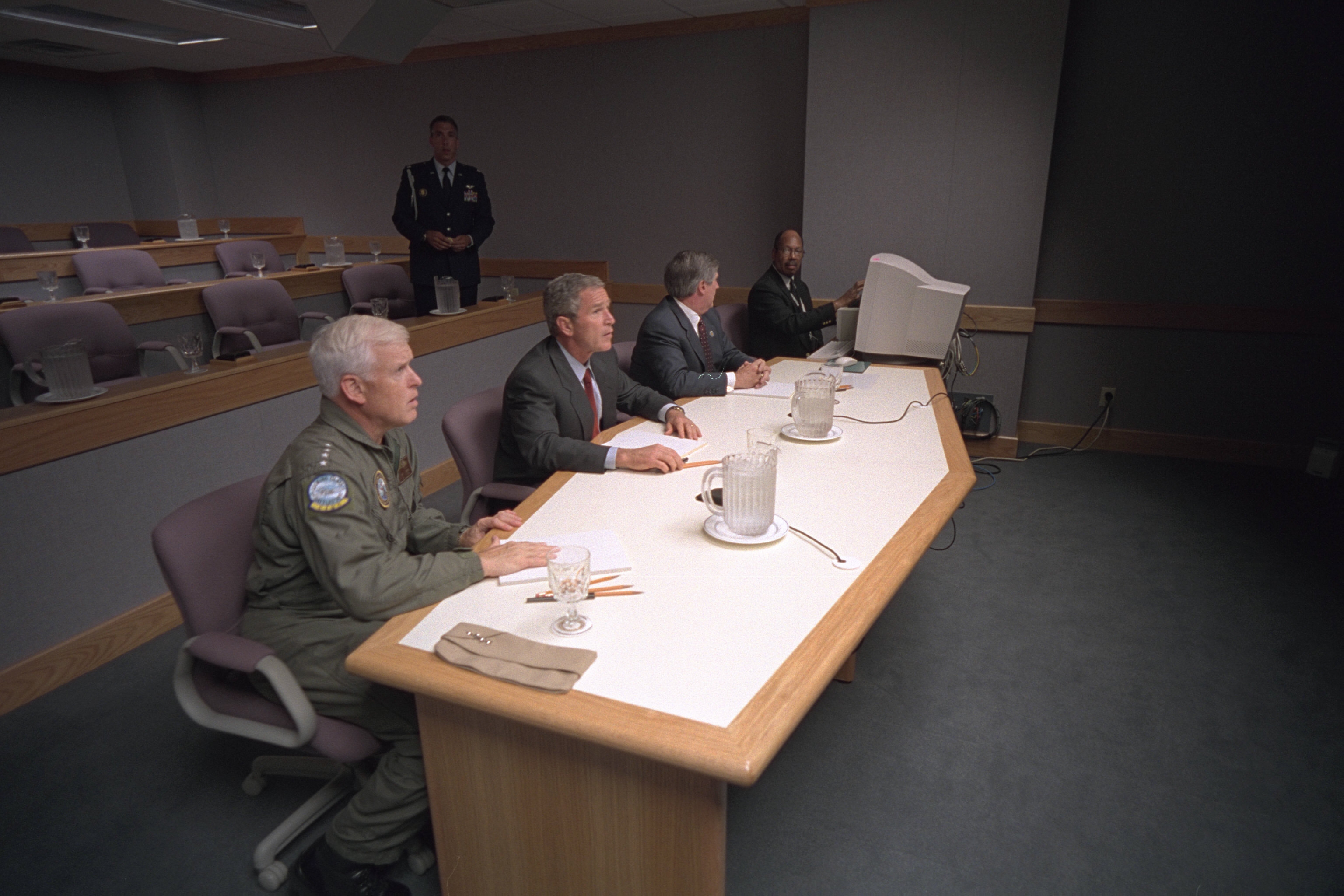
Richard Mies, President George Bush and White House Chief of Staff Andrew Card participate in a video teleconference from Offutt Air Force Base in Nebraska on September 11, 2001.

Richard Willard Mies (born May 30, 1944) is a retired United States Navy admiral who served as the fourth Commander in Chief of United States Strategic Command from 1998 to 2001.

== Naval career ==
Mies graduated at the top of his class from the United States Naval Academy in 1967, earning a Bachelor of Science degree with majors in mechanical engineering and mathematics. During his time at the academy, Mies actively participated in lightweight football and intercollegiate wrestling. He achieved recognition as an "all-league" football end and became the eastern champion in wrestling.

After completing his training for submarine duty, Mies served on two nuclear attack submarines, Sunfish (SSN-649) and L. Mendel Rivers (SSN-686), as well as a ballistic missile submarine, Nathan Hale (SSBN-623) (BLUE). He later commanded the nuclear attack submarine Sea Devil (SSN-664). Throughout his career, Mies held various command positions, including Commander of Submarine Development Squadron Twelve, Commander of Submarine Group Eight, and Commander of the Submarine Force United States Atlantic Fleet. He also served in notable staff positions, such as Chief of Staff to the Commander of Submarine Force, United States Pacific Fleet, and Director of Strategic Target Plans and Deputy Director of Plans and Policy on the staff of the Commander in Chief, United States Strategic Command. Mies further pursued his education at the University of Oxford in England, the Fletcher School of Law and Diplomacy at Tufts University, and Harvard University. He holds a master's degree in government administration and international relations.

Mies, a Chicago native, is a qualified submariner and naval aviation observer. His personal awards and decorations include the Defense Distinguished Service Medal, Navy Distinguished Service Medal, Defense Superior Service Medal (two awards), Legion of Merit (four awards), National Intelligence Distinguished Service Medal, Meritorious Service Medal (two awards), Navy and Marine Corps Commendation Medal (four awards), Navy and Marine Corps Achievement Medal, and Secretary of Energy Gold Medal.

Military offices
Preceded by Eugene E. Habiger	Commander, United States Strategic Command; 1998–2002	Succeeded by James O. Ellis
