= Joint Functional Component Command – Network Warfare =

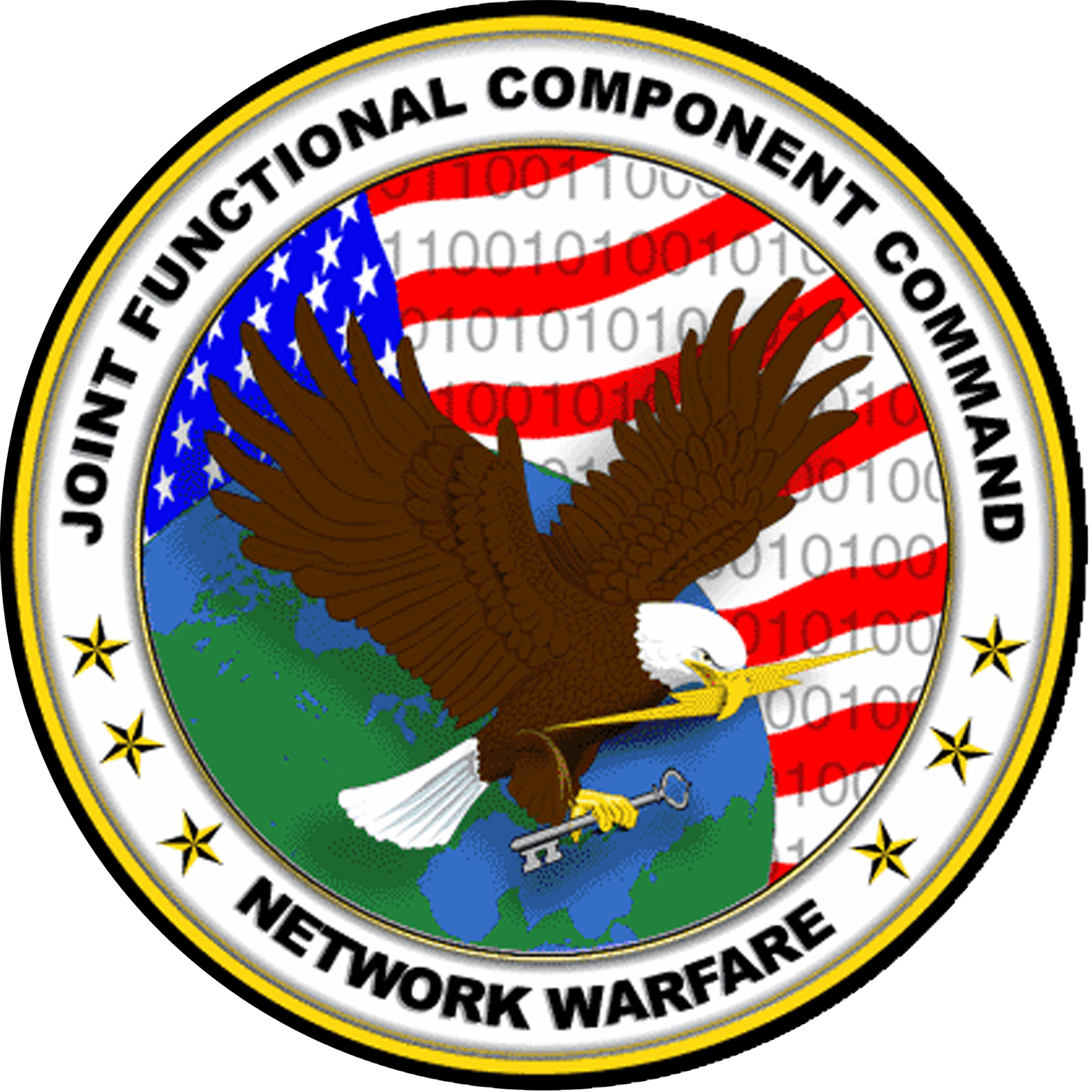
- JFCC-NW seal
- Active: 2004–2010
- Country: United States of America
- Type: sub-unified command
- Role: Information Operations
- Part of: USSTRATCOM
- Garrison/HQ: Fort Meade, Maryland
- Nickname(s): JFCC-NW

Commanders
- Current commander: General Keith Alexander

The Joint Functional Component Command – Network Warfare (JFCC-NW) at Fort Meade, Maryland was a subordinate component command of United States Strategic Command (USSTRATCOM) active from 2004 to 2010. It was responsible for coordinating offensive computer network operations for the United States Department of Defense (DoD). JFCC-NW was created in 2004. It was merged into United States Cyber Command in October 2010.

The Commander, JFCC-NW (currently Admiral Michael S. Rogers) is dual-hatted as the Director, National Security Agency. This coordinated approach to information operations involves two other supporting commands. The Director, Defense Information Systems Agency also heads the Joint Task Force-Global Network Operations. This organization is responsible for operating and defending U.S. worldwide information networks, a function closely aligned with the efforts of JFCC-NW.

== Mission ==
JFCC-NW facilitates/facilitated cooperative engagement with other national entities in computer network defense and offensive information warfare as part of the global information operations mission.

The command was responsible for the highly classified, evolving mission of Computer Network Attack (CNA).

== See also ==
- Joint Task Force-Global Network Operations
