= JBI =

The acronym JBI might refer to:

- Badjiri language, an extinct language of Australia
- Java Business Integration
- JBI International, formerly the Jewish Braille Institute
- JBI, formerly The Joanna Briggs Institute
- Joint Battlespace Infosphere
- Journal of Biomedical Informatics, a scientific journal
