= George Lee Butler =

US Air Force general

George L. Butler
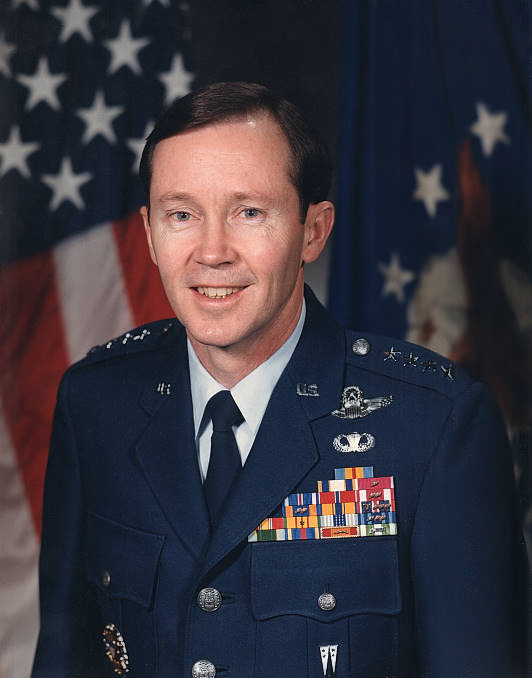
- Born: June 17, 1939 (age 87); Fort Benning, Georgia, U.S.
- Military career
- Allegiance: United States
- Branch: United States Air Force
- Service years: 1961–1994
- Rank: General
- Commands: United States Strategic Command; Strategic Air Command; 96th Bombardment Wing 320th Bombardment Wing
- Conflicts: Vietnam War
- Awards: Defense Distinguished Service Medal; Air Force Distinguished Service Medal; Legion of Merit (2); Distinguished Flying Cross; Bronze Star Medal; Air Medal (3)

George Lee Butler (born June 17, 1939), sometimes known as Lee Butler, is an American retired military officer. He was commander in chief, United States Strategic Command, and the last commander of Strategic Air Command. Following his retirement from the military he became active in the nuclear disarmament movement, calling for the outright abolition of nuclear weapons.

== Early life and education ==
Butler was born in 1939 at Fort Benning, Georgia, and graduated in 1957 from Washington-Lee High School in Arlington, Virginia. He earned a Bachelor of Science degree from the United States Air Force Academy in 1961 and a master's degree in international affairs from the University of Paris in 1967. He completed Squadron Officer School in 1964, Air Command and Staff College in 1970, and Armed Forces Staff College in 1974.

== Military career ==
Butler was commissioned in June 1961 and received undergraduate pilot training at Williams Air Force Base, Arizona, followed by basic instructor school at Randolph Air Force Base, Texas. He then flew as an instructor pilot in T-33s and also served as an academic instructor at Craig Air Force Base, Alabama, from March 1963 to December 1964.

Butler was selected for study in France as an Olmsted scholar. He received French language training at the State Department's Foreign Services Institute, Arlington, Virginia, prior to attending the University of Paris. After graduation, he attended F-4 combat crew training school and was assigned in March 1968 to the 12th Tactical Fighter Wing, Cam Ranh Bay Air Base, South Vietnam.

From August 1968 to March 1969 Butler was aide to the commander of 7th Air Force, Tan Son Nhut Air Base, South Vietnam. Returning to the United States and the United States Air Force Academy, he served as an instructor in the political science department, and as an executive officer and air officer commanding in the academy's military training department.

In July 1971 Butler was assigned as special assistant to the director, Office of Emergency Preparedness, Executive Office of the President, Washington, D.C. He again returned to the academy in January 1972, as an assistant professor in the political science department. After completing combat crew training in October 1972, he was assigned as chief pilot of the 53rd Military Airlift Squadron, 63rd Military Airlift Wing, Norton Air Force Base, California.

Butler entered the Armed Forces Staff College in July 1973 and, after graduating in February 1974, was assigned as air operations officer, International Relations Branch, Directorate of Plans, Strategic Arms Limitation Talks, Headquarters U.S. Air Force, Washington, D.C. Remaining at the Pentagon, he served from October 1974 to September 1975 as executive officer for the special assistant for strategic initiatives, Office of the Deputy Chief of Staff, Plans and Operations, Air Force headquarters.

Other Pentagon assignments in the following years included plans and programs officer, Strategy Development and Analysis, Directorate of Plans; executive director of Air Force Budget Issues Team; executive director, Airborne Warning and Control System task force; and chief of Congressional and Joint Matters Division, Directorate of Concepts.

After B-52 combat crew training in May 1977, Butler was assigned to the 416th Bombardment Wing (Heavy), Griffiss Air Force Base, New York, first as assistant deputy commander for operations and, later, as the wing's deputy commander for operations. In June 1979 he returned to Air Force headquarters as chief of a policy analysis group serving the Air Force chief of staff.

=== Command posts ===
From March 1981 to June 1983 Butler was assigned as vice commander of the 320th Bombardment Wing (Heavy), Mather Air Force Base, California, and then as wing commander. He subsequently took command of the 96th Bombardment Wing, Dyess Air Force Base, Texas, in June 1983. In July 1984 he was assigned to Headquarters Strategic Air Command, Offutt Air Force Base, as inspector general. Butler returned to Air Force headquarters in August 1986 as deputy director of operations and became director in January 1987.

In May 1987 Butler became vice director for strategic plans and policy, J-5, Office of the Joint Chiefs of Staff; in July 1989 he then became the director. In January 1991 he became the last commander in chief of Strategic Air Command, and director of Joint Strategic Target Planning Staff, with headquarters at Offutt Air Force Base. The Strategic Air Command was the nation's major nuclear deterrent force with bombers, tankers, reconnaissance aircraft and intercontinental ballistic missiles. The Joint Strategic Target Planning Staff coordinated U.S. nuclear war plans and developed the Single Integrated Operational Plan. He assumed his final command in June 1992, when Strategic Air Command was disestablished.

== Awards and decorations ==
Butler is a command pilot with more than 3,000 flying hours. He also holds navigator and parachutist ratings. His military awards and decorations include the Defense Distinguished Service Medal, Air Force Distinguished Service Medal, Legion of Merit with oak leaf cluster, Distinguished Flying Cross, Bronze Star Medal, Meritorious Service Medal with two oak leaf clusters, Air Medal with two oak leaf clusters, and Air Force Commendation Medal.

Butler was promoted to general January 25, 1991, with same date of rank, and retired February 28, 1994.

== Nuclear disarmament ==
Following his retirement he became active in the nuclear disarmament movement, and gave a speech in New Zealand, among other events, in so doing. In a series of public statements, beginning with a major speech at the National Press Club in 1996, he called for the outright abolition of nuclear weapons. In 1999, he and his wife founded the Second Chance Foundation, dedicated to promoting responsible global reduction of nuclear dangers. He was awarded the 8th Annual Heinz Award for Public Policy in 2002 for his work.

Author: Uncommon Cause – Volume I: A Life at Odds with Convention – The Formative Years, and Uncommon Cause – Volume II: A Life at Odds with Convention – The Transformative Years (Published 2016) Books by General George Lee Butler

Military offices
Preceded by John T. Chain Jr.	Commander, Strategic Air Command; 1991–1992	Command disbanded
New command	Commander, United States Strategic Command; 1992–1994	Succeeded by Henry G. Chiles Jr.
