= Global Information Network Architecture =

Global Information Network Architecture (GINA) is a software framework that bridges the symbolic and the connectionist representations of the world through executable conceptual models. Declarative contextual, causal, behavioral, and adaptive models for computational inferencing, analysis, and control can run and adapt based on the changing context of data-in-motion. This patented software technology enables the processing and the orchestration of context and causality for counterfactual analysis, decision support, and learning machines – addressing key roadblocks in the continued evolution of current AI, interoperability, and system-of-systems solutions.

Vector Relational Data Modeling (VRDM) is an object-based modeling language that differs significantly from traditional object-oriented software descriptions. A key goal of VRDM is to enable the definition of executable models. This means that the modeling constructs need to be capable of fully specifying the runtime structure of an application. One way VRDM achieves this is by introducing the notion of a Vector, which allows the participants in object relationships to be determined dynamically, as the model executes. This and the other core object-based constructs that make up the VRDM modeling language are combined through configuration, and not coding, to make possible software applications that are executable models and that are interpreted dynamically, just-in-time, just-in-context, and just-in-state.

The computational model underlying the GINA software was designed to facilitate a new type of Global Information Grid (GIG) for US security and defense Net-Centric Operations. In 2004, The GINA research and development team was convened under a cooperative research and development agreement (CRADA) between the U.S. Naval Postgraduate School (NPS) in Monterey, California and XSLENT LLC. XSLENT LLC contributed the patented executable component based modeling environment technology with NPS providing leadership and implementation sponsorship. The project was called Network Aware Business Data Management System (NABDMS). In late 2008, the United States Army Corps of Engineers (USACE) and the Engineer Research and Development Center (ERDC) began a second phase of the project under CRADA with Big Kahuna Technologies LLC, the current IP holders for the GINA technology. The GINA environment has been implemented to become a High Level Architecture (HLA) for System Fusion Networks (SFN) as an interoperable and multi-level security ("MLS") engine. because it uses Vector Relational Data Modelling (VRDM), a configurable, component based object model (CBOM) for managing data. GINA combines development, control and application. A third phase of the technology's evolution and implementations in support of US national security is underway with a CRADA with the Joint Staff of the Department of Defense for high-priority needs related to integration, system orchestration, sensor fusion, network convergence, cybersecurity, and numerous AI focused initiatives.

== GINA Technology Applications ==
- Command and Control (C2)
- C4ISR
- Counterfactual analytics
- Multi-level attribute-based network security
- Non-compiled executable enterprise solutions
- Cloud based digital artifact management (cloud library for documents, video, code, etc.)
- Active Cyber Defense/Offense applications
- Inference and Computational Learning
- Transfer learning (models that exhibit this quality across different domain applications)
