= Eugene E. Habiger =

American military general (1939–2022)

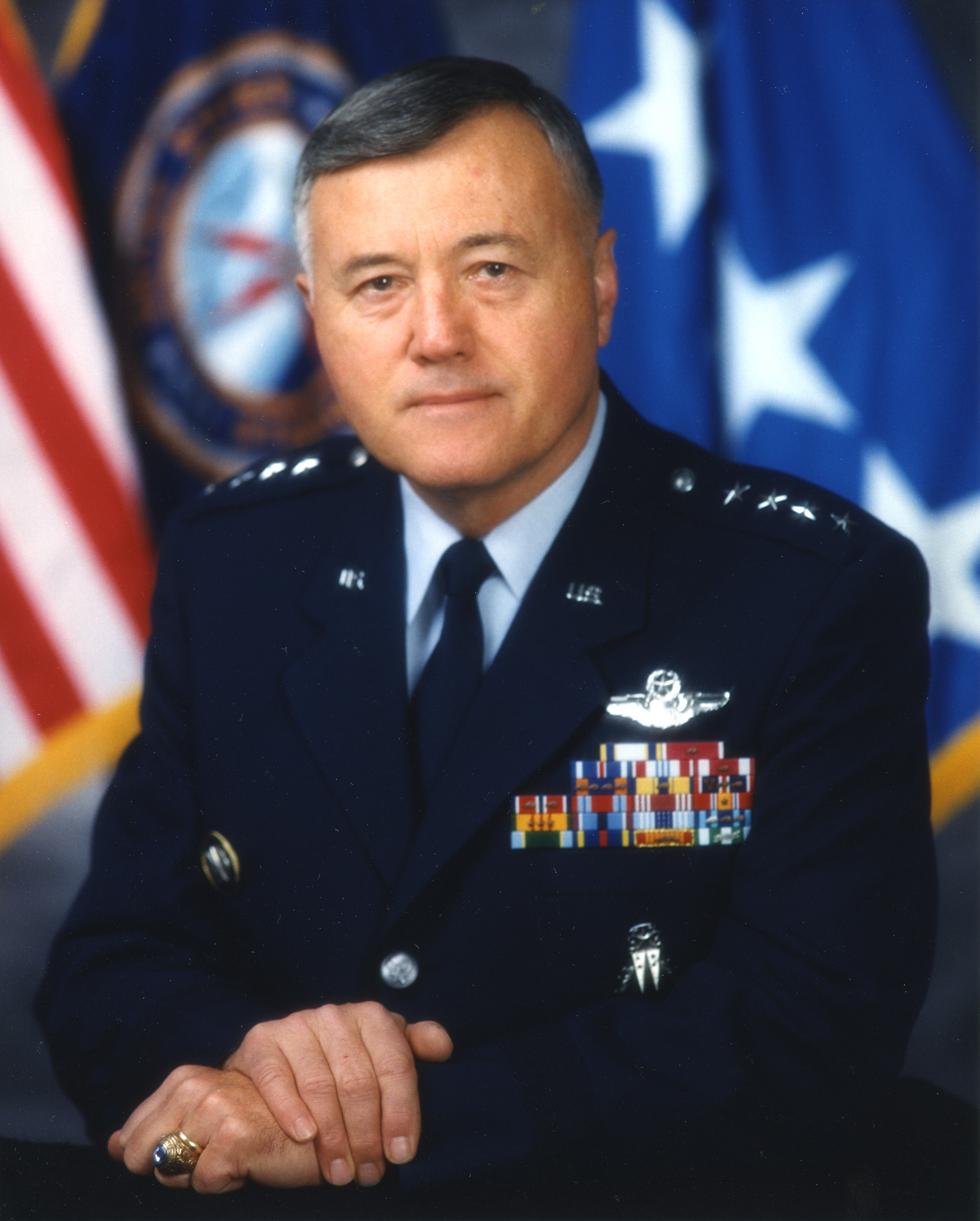
- Born: June 11, 1939; Oakland, California, U.S.
- Died: March 18, 2022 (aged 82); San Antonio, Texas, U.S.
- Burial place: Arlington National Cemetery
- Military career
- Allegiance: United States
- Branch: United States Air Force
- Service years: 1959–1998
- Rank: General
- Commands: United States Strategic Command; 2nd Bombardment Wing; 379th Bombardment Wing; 325th Bombardment Squadron
- Conflicts: Vietnam War
- Awards: Air Force Distinguished Service Medal; Legion of Merit (2); Distinguished Flying Cross

Eugene Emil Habiger (June 11, 1939 – March 18, 2022) was a United States Air Force four-star general who served as Commander in Chief, United States Strategic Command (USCINCSTRAT) from 1996 to 1998. After retiring from the military on August 1, 1998, he served as Director of Security and Emergency Operations, U.S. Department of Energy, from 1999 to 2001.

Born in Oakland, California in 1939, Habiger completed Officer Training School in September 1963 as a distinguished graduate. He has held a variety of staff and flying assignments including survival instructor, intelligence support project officer for major weapons systems, major command combat operations planner, executive officer and two Air Staff assignments. Flying assignments include aircraft commander, instructor pilot, operations officer, squadron commander and wing commander in two bomb wings. He was a command pilot with more than 5,000 flying hours, primarily in bomber aircraft. During the Vietnam War, he flew 150 combat missions and participated in the B-52 Arc Light operations. Habiger died on March 18, 2022, in San Antonio, Texas, aged 82.

== Education ==
- 1963 Bachelor of Science degree, University of Georgia
- 1971 Squadron Officer School, Maxwell Air Force Base, Alabama
- 1974 Master of Science degree in systems management, George Washington University, Washington, D.C.
- 1975 Air Command and Staff College, Maxwell Air Force Base, Alabama
- 1982 National War College, Fort Lesley J. McNair, Washington, D.C.
- 1986 Executive Management Program, Penn State University
- 1988 Program for Senior Executives and National Security Management, Harvard University, Massachusetts
- 1989 Fellow, Seminar XXI Program, Massachusetts Institute of Technology

== Assignments ==
- March 1959 – May 1963, enlisted, U.S. Army Infantry; later served in U.S. Army Reserve
- June 1963 – September 1963, student and distinguished graduate, Officer Training School, Lackland Air Force Base, Texas
- October 1963 – May 1964, student, Air Intelligence Officer Course, Lowry Air Force Base, Colorado
- May 1964 – July 1965, instructor, U.S. Air Force Survival School, Stead Air Force Base, Nevada
- July 1965 – August 1966, student, pilot training, Williams Air Force Base, Arizona
- September 1966 – January 1967, student, B-52 combat crew training, Castle Air Force Base, California
- January 1967 – November 1970, B-52 pilot and aircraft commander, 524th Bombardment Squadron, 379th Bombardment Wing, Wurtsmith Air Force Base, Michigan
- October 1969 – April 1970, B-52 pilot, Arc Light operations in Southeast Asia
- November 1970 – January 1971, student, C-7A training, Dyess Air Force Base, Texas
- January 1971 – September 1971, C-7A pilot and instructor pilot, 457th Tactical Airlift Squadron, 483rd Airlift Wing, Cam Ranh Bay Air Base, South Vietnam
- September 1971 – August 1974, intelligence support project officer for F-15 and A-10 weapons systems and the Airborne Warning and Control System, Headquarters Tactical Air Command, Langley Air Force Base, Virginia
- August 1974 – June 1975, student and distinguished graduate, Air Command and Staff College, Maxwell Air Force Base, Alabama
- June 1975 – September 1977, operations officer, 644th Bombardment Squadron, 410th Bombardment Wing, K.I. Sawyer Air Force Base, Michigan
- September 1977 – January 1980, combat operations planner, later executive officer to the deputy chief of staff, operations and plans, and the deputy director for the Single Integrated Operational Plan, Joint Strategic Target Planning Staff, Headquarters Strategic Air Command, Offutt Air Force Base, Nebraska
- January 1980 – July 1981, commander, 325th Bombardment Squadron, later assistant deputy commander for operations, 92nd Bombardment Wing, both at Fairchild Air Force Base, Washington
- July 1981 – June 1982, student, National War College, Fort Lesley J. McNair, Washington, D.C.
- June 1982 – April 1983, chief, strategic offensive forces division, deputy directorate for force development, directorate of plans, deputy chief of staff, plans and operations, Headquarters U.S. Air Force, the Pentagon, Washington, D.C.
- April 1983 – October 1983, deputy assistant director for Joint and National Security Council Matters, directorate of plans, deputy chief of staff, plans and operations, Headquarters U.S. Air Force, the Pentagon, Washington, D.C.
- October 1983 – August 1984, executive officer to the Air Force vice chief of staff, Headquarters U.S. Air Force, the Pentagon, Washington, D.C.
- August 1984 – March 1985, vice commander, 5th Bombardment Wing, Minot Air Force Base, North Dakota
- March 1985 – January 1986, commander, 379th Bombardment Wing, Wurtsmith Air Force Base, Michigan
- January 1986 – January 1987, commander, 2nd Bombardment Wing, Barksdale Air Force Base, Louisiana
- January 1987 – January 1988, inspector general, Headquarters Strategic Air Command, Offutt Air Force Base, Nebraska
- January 1988 – September 1991, deputy director, later director, programs and evaluation, Office of the Deputy Chief of Staff, Programs and Resources, Headquarters U.S. Air Force, the Pentagon, Washington, D.C. During this assignment, he was also the chairman of the Program Review Committee and the Air Force Board
- August 1991 – April 1995, vice commander, Headquarters Air Education and Training Command, Randolph Air Force Base, Texas
- April 1995 – February 1996, deputy chief of staff for personnel, Headquarters U.S. Air Force, Washington, D.C.
- February 1996 – 1998, commander in chief, United States Strategic Command, Offutt Air Force Base, Nebraska

== Flight information ==
- Rating: Command pilot
- Flight hours: More than 5,000 hours
- Aircraft flown: B-52, KC-135, EC-135, KC-10, C-7A and T-39

== Major awards and decorations ==
- Air Force Distinguished Service Medal
- Legion of Merit with oak leaf cluster
- Distinguished Flying Cross
- Defense Meritorious Service Medal
- Meritorious Service Medal with oak leaf cluster
- Air Medal with four oak leaf clusters
- Air Force Commendation Medal with oak leaf cluster
- Humanitarian Service Medal
- Vietnam Gallantry Cross Unit Citation

== Effective dates of promotion ==
- Second Lieutenant September 24, 1963
- First Lieutenant March 24, 1965
- Captain April 1, 1967
- Major June 1, 1974
- Lieutenant Colonel April 1, 1979
- Colonel July 1, 1981
- Brigadier General May 1, 1988
- Major General December 1, 1990
- Lieutenant General March 26, 1993
- General March 1, 1996

Military offices
Preceded by Henry G. Chiles, Jr.	Commander, United States Strategic Command; 1996–1998	Succeeded by Richard W. Mies
