= USS Sunfish (SSN-649) =

Submarine of the United States

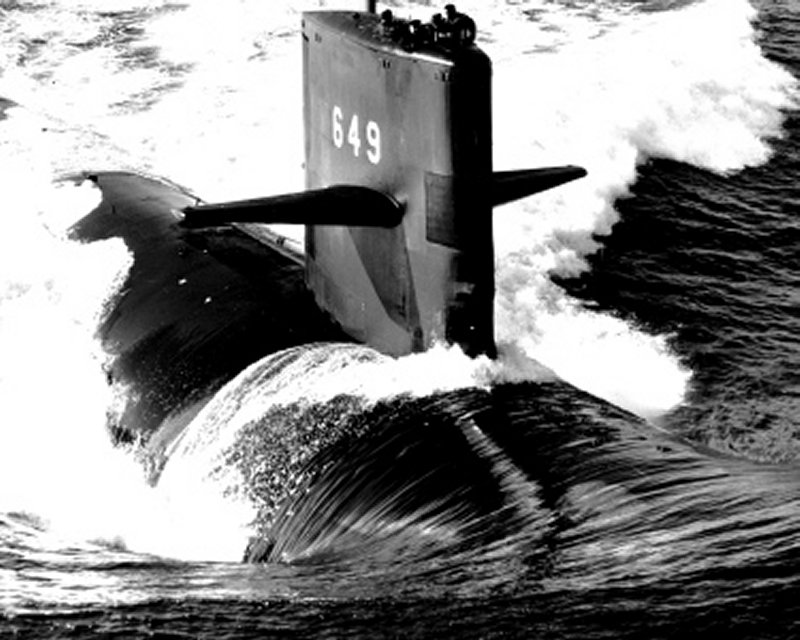
- USS Sunfish (SSN-649) on sea trials off Quincy, Massachusetts, on 10 March 1969, five days before her commissioning.

History

United States
- Name: USS Sunfish (SSN-649)
- Namesake: The ocean sunfish (Mola mola)
- Ordered: 26 March 1963
- Builder: General Dynamics Quincy Shipbuilding Division, Quincy, Massachusetts
- Laid down: 15 January 1965
- Launched: 14 October 1966
- Sponsored by: Mrs. Robert C. Byrd
- Commissioned: 15 March 1969
- Decommissioned: 31 March 1997
- Stricken: 31 March 1997
- Fate: Scrapping via Ship and Submarine Recycling Program completed 31 October 1997
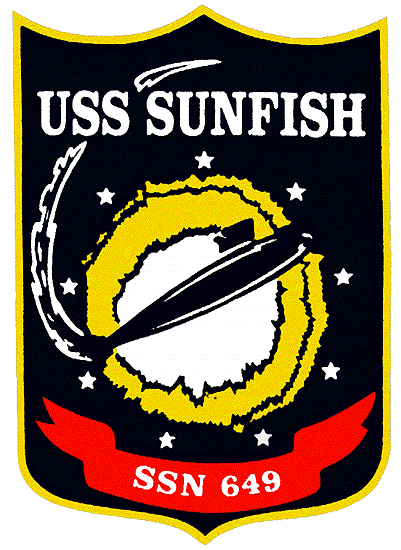
- Badge

General characteristics
- Class & type: Sturgeon-class attack submarine
- Displacement: 4,035 long tons (4,100 t) light; 4,326 long tons (4,395 t) full; 291 long tons (296 t) dead
- Length: 289 ft (88 m)
- Beam: 32 ft (9.8 m)
- Draft: 29 ft (8.8 m)
- Installed power: 15,000 shaft horsepower (11.2 megawatts)
- Propulsion: One S5W nuclear reactor, two steam turbines, one screw
- Speed: Over 20 knots (37 km/h; 23 mph) submerged
- Test depth: 1,300 feet (400 meters)
- Complement: 109 (14 officers, 95 enlisted men)
- Armament: 4 × 21-inch (533 mm) torpedo tubes; UUM-44A SUBROC missiles; UGM-84A/C Harpoon missiles

USS Sunfish (SSN-649), a Sturgeon-class attack submarine, was the second ship of the United States Navy to be named for the ocean sunfish (Mola mola), a marine species having a deep body truncated behind, and high dorsal and anal fins.

== Construction and commissioning ==
The contract to build Sunfish was awarded to the General Dynamics Quincy Shipbuilding Division in Quincy, Massachusetts, on 26 March 1963 and her keel was laid down there on 15 January 1965. She was one of the two nuclear submarines built at the former Fore River Shipyard, the other being USS Whale (SSN-638). Whale's keel was laid down on 27 May 1964 and these two were the only submarines built there since 1925.

She was launched on 14 October 1966, sponsored by Mrs. Robert C. Byrd, the wife of United States Senator Robert C. Byrd of West Virginia, and commissioned on 15 March 1969.

== Service history ==
=== 1969–1975 ===
Sunfish spent the period from April to August 1969 undergoing shakedown and in various exercises such as torpedo firing, sound trials, control drills, and casualty drills. A short dedependents' cruise in late August 1969 was followed by post-shakedown repairs and alterations at Groton, Connecticut. The last two weeks of 1969 were devoted to a leave and recreation period for the crew.

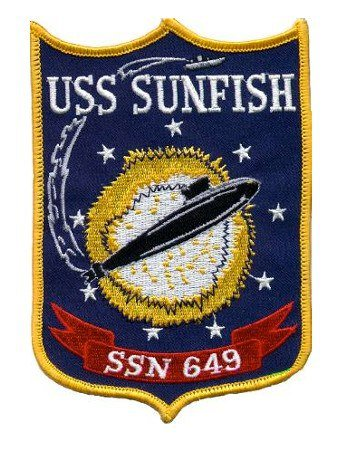
USS Sunfish patch.

Sunfish spent early 1970 in upkeep periods and several short cruises in preparation for an extended deployment. She was deployed from 16 June to 26 August 1970, when she arrived at her home port, Charleston, South Carolina. She deployed again from 6 October to 1 December 1970.

Sunfish put to sea again on 22 January 1971 to participate in a short fleet exercise, but her operational commitments changed after she left port and she did not return until 9 March 1971. She made a cruise to Port Everglades, Florida, in April 1971, followed by a fleet exercise. She spent the remainder of 1971 participating in antisubmarine warfare exercises with destroyers and patrol aircraft.

Sunfish departed Charleston on 3 January 1972, for a deployment to the Mediterranean Sea and a tour of duty with the United States Sixth Fleet. She returned to her Charleston on 21 May 1972 and entered a stand-down period that lasted until early October, when she entered the Norfolk Naval Shipyard at Portsmouth, Virginia, for her first major overhaul.

The overhaul was completed in August 1973, and Sunfish proceeded to New London, Connecticut, for refresher training. She touched at Charleston in early November 1973, then continued to the Caribbean Sea for sound training and weapon systems tests.

Sunfish returned to Charleston on 9 December 1973 for a leave and upkeep period. She operated along the United States East Coast from New London to Cape Kennedy, Florida, until June 1974. During the period from June 1974 until December 1975, Sunfish completed highly successful Mediterranean and North Atlantic deployments as well as Western Atlantic operations and a successful MK 48 Torpedo SINKEX. She was awarded the Submarine Squadron Four Battle E and a Meritorious Unit Commendation.

=== 1978-1981 ===
The boat was scheduled for refit, and was sent to Ingalls Shipyard, East Bank facility, Pascagoula, Mississippi in the early part of 1978. Ingalls was owned by Litton Industries at the time, She successfully weathered Hurricane Frederic, which hit the Gulf Coast region. There were numerous delays, but in early 1980, she completed her sea trials, and was again sent to her homeport at the United States Naval Base, Charleston, South Carolina, after a Caribbean visit to San Juan, Puerto Rico.

=== 1000th dive, 1996 ===
Sunfish's home port had been changed to Norfolk, Virginia, by 1996, when she made history: Early that year, after pulling away from the submarine tender USS Simon Lake (AS-33), Sunfish made her one thousandth dive. Commander Submarine Group 8, Rear Admiral Richard W. Mies, who had served on Sunfish from March 1970 to April 1973, was aboard to give the order to submerge for the history-making dive. On 4 March 1996, the U.S. Navy's Chief of Naval Information released this story:

USS Sunfish (SSN-649) recently reached a milestone few other submarines can claim. It made its 1,000th dive. "Many subs don't make it this far and are decommissioned before their 1,000th dive," said Commanding Officer CDR [Commander] E. Jackson Roeske. "This dive is not only a unique event, it also demonstrates the tremendous longevity and outstanding engineering capabilities of our submarine force."

Sunfish made her last deployment to the Mediterranean in 1995 - 1996. Port visits included La Maddalena, Italy and Lisbon, Portugal. In March 1996 the Sunfish returned back to its homeport of Norfolk for the last time. In September 1996, Sunfish departed Norfolk for the final time. For its efforts during this period, the boat and crew were awarded the Armed Forces Service Medal. After a transit through the Panama Canal, the crew became "shellbacks" by crossing the Equator (at a classified longitude). Sunfish stopped briefly in San Diego to offload torpedoes before her final underway to the Puget Sound Naval Shipyard in Bremerton, Washington.

== Decommissioning and disposal ==
Sunfish was decommissioned on 31 March 1997 and stricken from the Naval Vessel Register the same day. her scrapping via the Nuclear-Powered Ship and Submarine Recycling Program at Puget Sound Navy Yard at Bremerton, Washington was completed on 31 October 1997.
