= James O. Ellis =

American naval and air officer, aerospace executive and energy expert

James O. Ellis Jr.
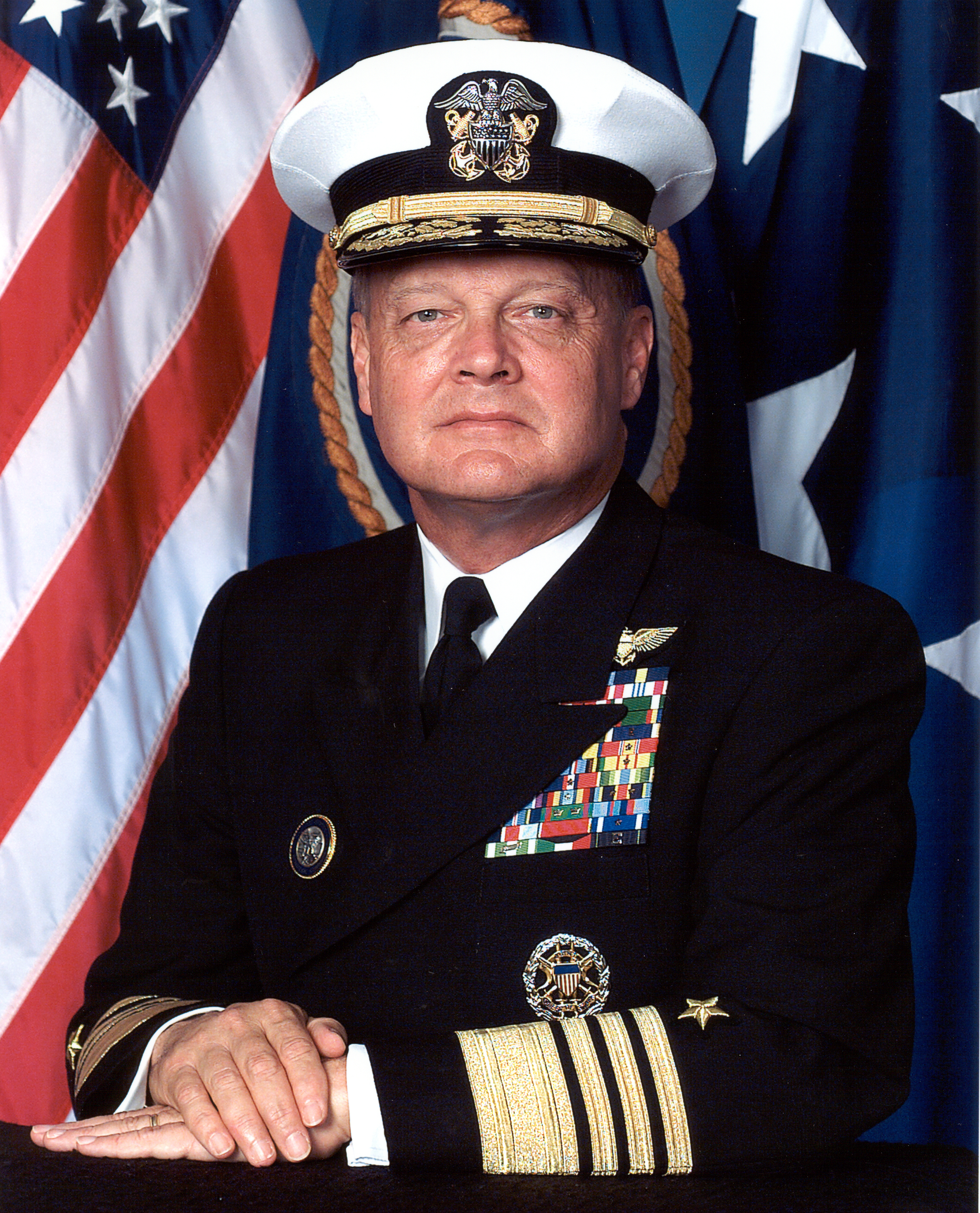
- Admiral Ellis as Commander, U.S. Strategic Command
- Born: July 20, 1947 (age 79); Spartanburg, South Carolina, U.S.
- Military career
- Allegiance: United States
- Branch: United States Navy
- Service years: 1969–2004
- Rank: Admiral
- Commands: United States Strategic Command; United States Naval Forces Europe; Carrier Strike Group Five; USS Abraham Lincoln (CVN-72); USS La Salle (AGF-3); VFA-131
- Conflicts: Vietnam War; Gulf War; Invasion of Panama; 1999 NATO Bombing of Yugoslavia
- Awards: Defense Distinguished Service Medal (3); Navy Distinguished Service Medal (2); Legion of Merit (4)
- Other work: Lockheed Martin

Admiral James Oren Ellis Jr. (born July 20, 1947) is a retired 4-star admiral and former commander, United States Strategic Command, Offutt Air Force Base, Nebraska. He was president and chief executive officer of the Institute of Nuclear Power Operations until May 2012. He joined the board of directors of Lockheed Martin in 2004, and served until 2024.

Since retiring from the military, Ellis has been the Annenberg distinguished visiting fellow at the Hoover Institution at Stanford University.

In 2013, Ellis was elected a member of the National Academy of Engineering for leadership in advancing safe nuclear power plant operations throughout the world.

== Early life ==
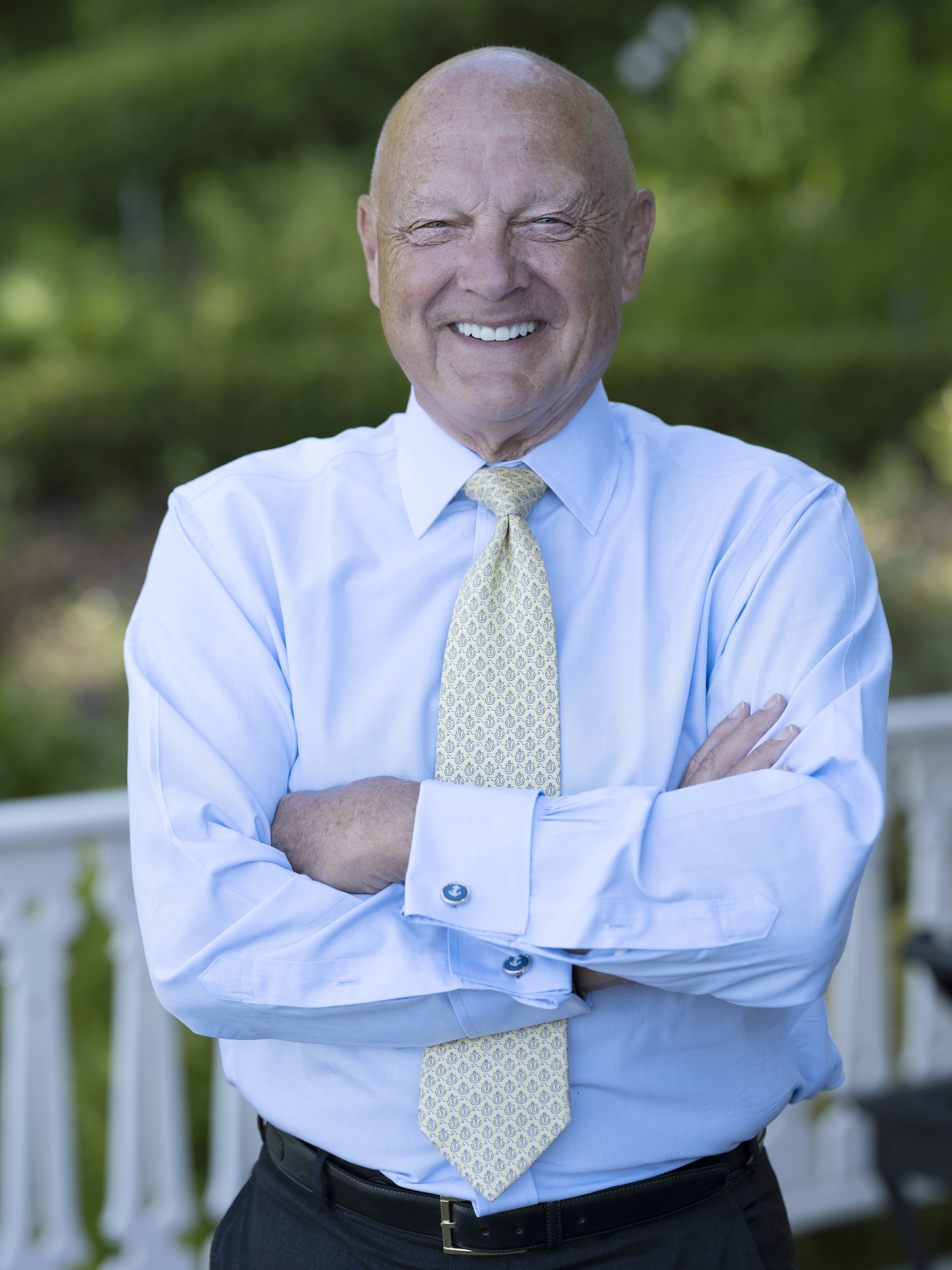
Admiral Ellis

Ellis, born in Spartanburg, South Carolina, is a 1969 graduate of the United States Naval Academy. He was designated a Naval Aviator in 1971 and held a variety of sea and shore assignments from 1972.

== Naval career ==
Ellis's sea duty billets as a navy fighter pilot included tours with Fighter Squadron 92 aboard USS Constellation (CV-64) and Fighter Squadron 1 aboard USS Ranger (CV-61). Ellis was the first Commanding Officer of Strike Fighter Squadron 131, deploying in 1985 with new F/A-18 Hornets aboard USS Coral Sea (CV-43). He served as Executive Officer of the nuclear-powered aircraft carrier USS Carl Vinson (CVN-70) and as Commanding Officer of USS La Salle (AGF-3), the Persian Gulf flagship of the Commander, Joint Task Force, Middle East. In 1991 he assumed command of USS Abraham Lincoln (CVN-72) and participated in Operation Desert Storm while deployed during her maiden voyage in the western Pacific and Persian Gulf. In June 1995, Ellis assumed command of Carrier Group Five/Battle Force Seventh Fleet, breaking his flag aboard USS Independence (CV-62), forward deployed to the Western Pacific and homeported in Yokosuka, Japan. As Carrier Battle Group Commander he led contingency response operations to both the Persian Gulf and Taiwan Straits.

Ellis's shore and staff assignments include tours as an experimental/operational test pilot, service in the Navy Office of Legislative Affairs, and duty as F/A-18 Program Coordinator, Deputy Chief of Naval Operations (Air Warfare). He has also served as Deputy Commander and Chief of Staff, Joint Task Force FIVE, the counter-narcotics force for United States Commander in Chief Pacific. In November 1993 he reported as Inspector General, United States Atlantic Fleet, and subsequently served as Director for Operations, Plans and Policy (N3/N5) on the staff of the Commander in Chief, United States Atlantic Fleet. He assumed duties as Deputy Chief of Naval Operations (Plans, Policy and Operations) in November 1996. Ellis became Commander in Chief, United States Naval Forces Europe, headquartered in London, England, and Commander in Chief, Allied Forces, Southern Europe headquartered in Naples, Italy, in October 1998.

Ellis served as Commander, United States Strategic Command, from 2002 and retired from the navy in 2004.

== Education ==
Ellis holds Master of Science degrees in aerospace engineering from the Georgia Institute of Technology and in aeronautical systems from the University of West Florida. He is also a 1975 graduate of United States Naval Test Pilot School. He completed United States Navy nuclear power training in 1987 and is a graduate of the Senior Officer Program in National Security Strategy at Harvard University.

== Awards and decorations ==

Naval Aviator Badge
Defense Distinguished Service Medal with two bronze oak leaf clusters
Navy Distinguished Service Medal with one gold award star	Legion of Merit with three gold award stars	Defense Meritorious Service Medal
Meritorious Service Medal with award star	Navy and Marine Corps Commendation Medal	Joint Meritorious Unit Award with three oak leaf clusters
Navy Unit Commendation	Navy Meritorious Unit Commendation	Navy E Ribbon
Navy Expeditionary Medal	National Defense Service Medal with two bronze service stars	Armed Forces Expeditionary Medal
Vietnam Service Medal with service star	Southwest Asia Service Medal with service star	Kosovo Campaign Medal with service star
Armed Forces Service Medal	Humanitarian Service Medal with service star	Navy Sea Service Deployment Ribbon with silver service star
Navy & Marine Corps Overseas Service Ribbon	Special Operations Service Ribbon	Order of Merit of the Italian Republic, Grand Officer
Order of Merit of the Republic of Hungary, Military Commander's Cross	United Nations Medal with service star	NATO Medal for the former Yugoslavia with service star
Vietnam Campaign Medal	Kuwait Liberation Medal from Kuwait	Navy Expert Pistol Shot Medal
Basic Parachutist Badge
Office of the Joint Chiefs of Staff Identification Badge
United States Strategic Command Badge

Military offices
Preceded by Richard W. Mies	Commander, United States Strategic Command; 2002–2004	Succeeded by James E. Cartwright
