= Henry G. Chiles Jr. =

United States Navy admiral (born 1938)

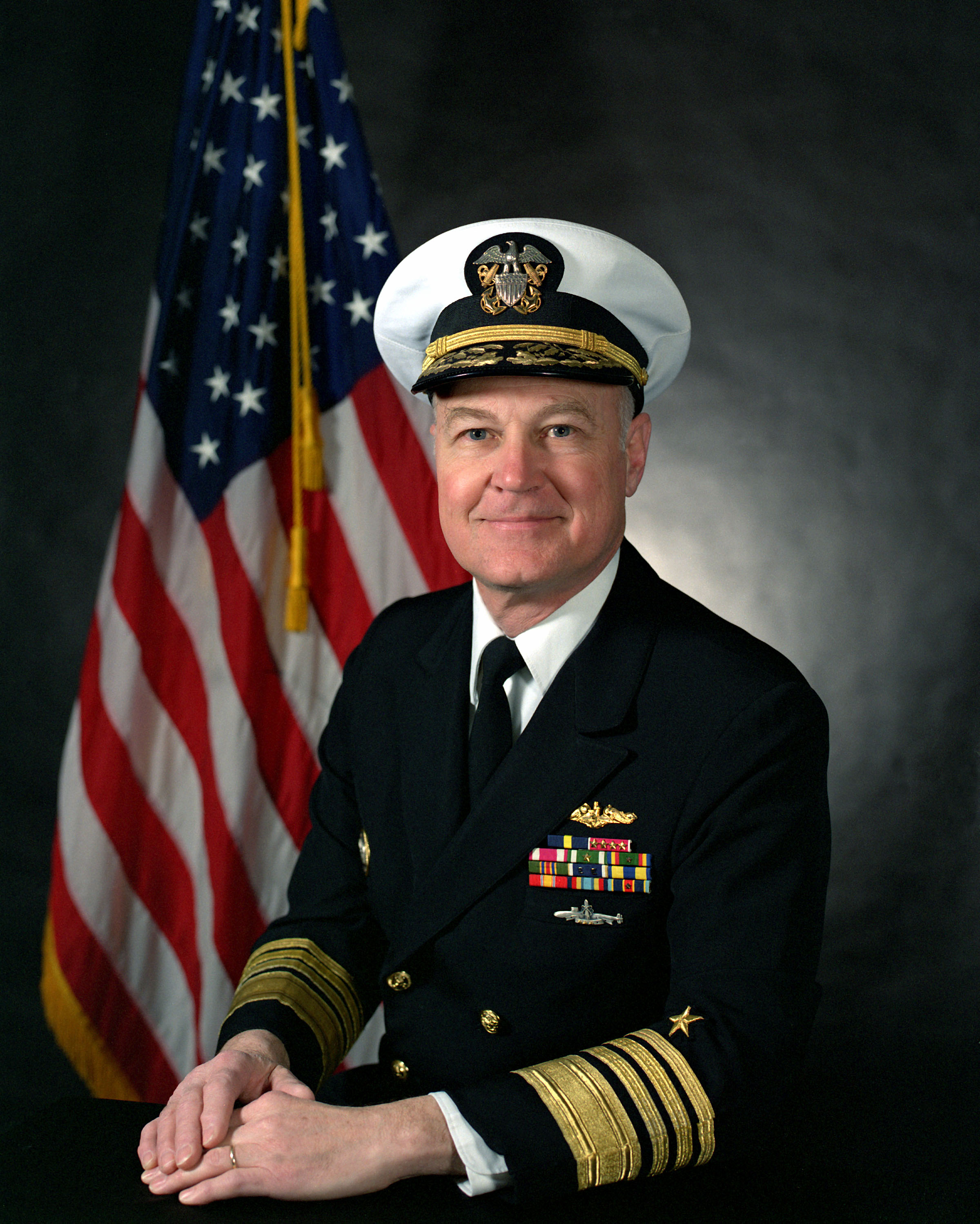
- Admiral Henry G. Chiles Jr.
- Born: January 5, 1938 (age 88); Baltimore, Maryland, U.S.
- Military career
- Allegiance: United States of America
- Branch: United States Navy
- Service years: 1960-1996
- Rank: Admiral
- Nicknames: Hank; Hammering Hank
- Commands: USS Gurnard (SSN-662); Submarine Squadron Three; Naval Training Center San Diego; Submarine Group Eight; Allied Submarines Mediterranean (NATO); Submarine Forces U.S. Atlantic Fleet; Allied Submarines Atlantic (NATO); U.S. Strategic Command
- Awards: Navy Distinguished Service Medal; Legion of Merit (5)

Henry Goodman Chiles Jr. (born January 5, 1938) is a retired United States Navy four star admiral who served as Commander in Chief, United States Strategic Command (USCINCSTRAT), from 1994 to 1996, the first naval officer to command all of the strategic nuclear forces of the United States.

== Education ==
Henry G. Chiles Jr. entered from the United States Naval Academy as a midshipman in 1956, graduating in 1960 with a Bachelor of Science degree. He studied at Keble College, Oxford University, receiving a Bachelor of Arts degree in Foreign Affairs in 1975, and received a Masters of Arts degree in Foreign Affairs from Keble College, Oxford University, studying politics, philosophy and economics, in 1986.

== Naval career ==
Chiles was commissioned an ensign on 8 June 1960. His first tour of duty was on USS Borie (DD-704) from July, 1960 to September, 1961. He attended the U.S. Naval Submarine School in Groton, Connecticut until March 1962 and then Naval Nuclear Power Training Unit in Schenectady, New York. He was promoted to lieutenant (junior grade) while at Groton.

His first submarine duty was with USS Triton from April 1963 to January 1966. While on board Triton, he was promoted to lieutenant.

Lt. Chiles' next assignment was as an engineering officer with the Blue crew of the nuclear-powered ballistic missile submarine USS Tecumseh from January 1966 to February 1968. He was on the staff of commander, Submarine Squadron 15 as the Material Officer until June 1970, where he made lieutenant commander. He reported to the pre-commissioning unit USS Drum and served as its executive officer until September 1973, then reported for duty at the U.S. Naval Activities, United Kingdom. Upon his departure in September, 1975, he was promoted to commander.

Commander Chiles served at COMSUBPAC under instruction until December 1975 and then reported to USS Gurnard in February 1976. Following an under ice Arctic Ocean deployment, he assumed command of the Gurnard on 30 May 1976. The submarine also conducted a refueling overhaul in record time and a Western Pacific deployment before Chiles departed on 15 October 1979.

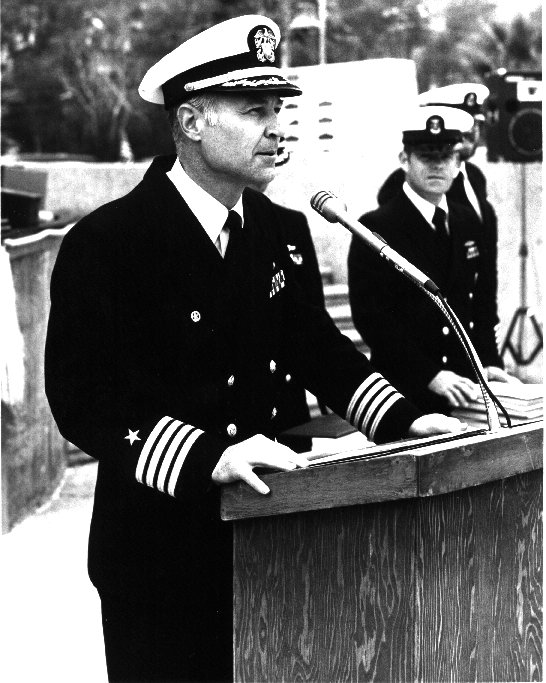
Captain Henry G. Chiles, USN

From April 1980 until July 1983, Chiles was special assistant to the director of the Naval Nuclear Propulsion Program, U.S. Department of Energy, conducting fleet liaison and directing the prospective commanding officer's course for Admiral Hyman G. Rickover and his relief, Admiral Kinnaird R. McKee. He was promoted to captain while at this assignment.

Captain Chiles served as commander, Submarine Squadron Three until July, 1985 and then reported to Naval Training Center San Diego as the center commander.

Chiles served as director, Strategic Submarine Division and Deputy Assistant Chief of Naval Operations for undersea warfare between July 1985 and September 1987 and was promoted to rear admiral (lower half).

Rear Admiral Chiles took command of Submarine Group Eight, and also served concurrently as NATO's Commander Allied Submarines Mediterranean, based in Naples, Italy until December 1990. He received his second star during this assignment.

Vice Admiral Chiles served as Commander Submarines U.S. Atlantic Fleet (COMSUBLANT), as well as NATO's Commander Allied Submarines Atlantic, from December 1990 to September 1993.

On 24 September 1993, Vice Admiral Chiles became the deputy commander-in-chief and chief of staff for the United States Strategic Command (STRATCOM) at Offutt Air Force Base.

Promoted to Admiral on 14 February 1994, Chiles took command of STRATCOM, the first U.S. naval flag officer to do so, a position that he held until his retirement on 21 February 1996. The primary focus of Chiles' tenure as USCINCSTRAT was adjusting the structure and mission for U.S. strategic nuclear forces in a post-Cold War environment.

== Awards and decorations ==
During his career, Admiral Chiles has received the Navy Distinguished Service Medal, Legion of Merit with four gold stars in lieu of subsequent awards; the Meritorious Service Medal; the Navy and Marine Corps Commendation Medal with one gold star in lieu of a second award; the Navy Unit Commendation with one bronze star; a Meritorious Unit Commendation awarded to Submarine Squadron 15; a Navy E Ribbon with two "Es'; a Navy Expeditionary Medal; the National Defense Service Medal; a Sea Service Deployment Ribbon; and an Overseas Service Ribbon. He is also a recipient of the Distinguished Graduate Award (DGA) of the Naval Academy Alumni Association in 2008

== Retirement ==
Admiral Chiles serves as an adjunct fellow with the Center for Strategic and International Studies (CSIS). He is a member of the board of advisors of the National Military Family Association (NMFA). He is also a member of the Distinguished Advisory Board to the Dolphin Scholarship Foundation. Admiral Chiles chaired the National Nuclear Security Administration Advisory Committee, and he is a Distinguished Professor of Leadership at the U.S. Naval Academy.

== Personal ==
Admiral Chiles has three sons: John, Peter, and Henry. His wife, the former Katherine (Katy) L. Pearson, died of Alzheimer's disease in October 2006. He remarried Alice Pearson. He currently attends John Calvin Presbyterian Church weekly where he teaches the youth group there.

== Notes ==
Military offices
Preceded by George L. Butler	Commander, United States Strategic Command; 1994–1996	Succeeded by Eugene E. Habiger
