= Joint Task Force – Global Network Operations =

Global Information Grid

Joint Task Force-Global Network Operations (JTF-GNO) was a subordinate command of United States Strategic Command whose mission was to: direct the operation and defense of the Global Information Grid (GIG) across strategic, operational, and tactical boundaries in support of the US Department of Defense's full spectrum of war fighting, intelligence, and business operations.

The Task Force's operations were moved to Fort Meade, Maryland, in April 2010 as part of decisions reached under the 2005 Base Realignment and Closure process. JTF-GNO was dissolved and incorporated within the United States Cyber Command on September 7, 2010.

== Primary responsibilities ==
- Identifies and resolves computer security anomalies that affect the GIG's ability to support Secretary of Defense (SECDEF) elements, Joint Staff, Supported Combatant Commands and the "warfighter".
- Identifies significant threats to the GIG. Develop, disseminate and implement countermeasures to these threats in a timely manner via Information Assurance Vulnerability Messages (IAVM)
- Assesses the incidents reported by Combatant Command, service, and agency (CC/S/A) computer network defense (CND) and Regions individually and cumulatively for their impact on the "warfighter’s" ability to carry out current and future missions.
- Coordinates the response actions taken by the CC/S/A CND service providers (CNDSP).
- Identifies emerging technologies and their associated threats in order to integrate migrations and response actions into current CND posture.

== History ==
In 1998 the Department of Defense recognized a growing cyber threat and in response created the Joint Task Force-Computer Network Defense (JTF-CND), which achieved initial operational capability on 30 December 1998 and full operational capability by June 1999.

In the fall of 2000, the JTF-CND assumed responsibility for the DoD computer network attack mission and became the Joint Task Force—Computer Network Operations (JTF-CNO). In October 2002, the new Unified Command Plan, Change 2, re-aligned JTF-CNO under the United States Strategic Command (USSTRATCOM)

The JTF-CNO began its largest and most comprehensive transformation in April 2004 when the Commander of US Strategic Command approved the Joint Concept of Operations for GIG Network Operations. This “NetOps CONOPS” provided the common framework and command and control structure to conduct the USSTRATCOM Unified Command Plan-assigned mission of Global Network Operations, combining the disciplines of enterprise systems and network management, network defense, and information decision management.

The Secretary of Defense signed a delegation of authority letter on 18 June 2004, designating the Director, DISA as the new Commander of the Joint Task Force-Global Network Operations. With this designation, the new command assumed the responsibility for directing the operation and defense of the GIG.

This transformation enhanced the JTF GNO's mission and objectives was crucial in pushing towards the Joint Vision 2020 Objectives and the evolving concept of Net-Centricity.

Hackers attempted to enter United States Department of Defense networks nearly 75,000 times in 2004.

== Former operations ==
The JTF-GNO functions in accordance with Unified Command Plan 2002 (Change 2) and the Joint Concept of Operations for GIG NetOps, assuring Global Information Superiority by achieving the three assurances outlined in the Joint Concept of Operations for GIG NetOps: Assured System and Network Availability, Assured Information Protection, and Assured Information Delivery.

The Task Force has a number of associated service components, including the 1st Information Operations Command (Land), the affiliated United States Army formation.

== Personnel ==
The JTF-GNO was authorized 255 positions at the height of its operations in early 2009. Lieutenant General Carroll F. Pollett was the Commander of JTF-GNO during its disestablishment.

== Bibliography ==
- Ackerman, Robert K. (August 2005). “Keeping ahead of cyberfoes remains the key to protecting information technology assets.” Signal Magazine
- Brooks, Peter. (August 30, 2005). “The Art of (Cyber) War^{[unfit]}.” The Heritage Foundation
