= United States Strategic Command =

United States military command structure

- Official emblem of United States Strategic Command.
- Founded: June 1, 1992
- Country: United States
- Type: Functional combatant command
- Role: Strategic deterrence, global strike, integrated missile defense, global C4ISR
- Size: 150,000 personnel, 14 ballistic missile submarines, 400 ICBMs, 140 bombers
- Part of: U.S. Department of Defense
- Headquarters: Offutt Air Force Base, Nebraska, U.S.
- Nicknames: STRATCOM, USSTRATCOM
- Motto: Peace is our Profession ...
- Website: www.stratcom.mil

Commanders
- Commander: ADM Richard A. Correll, USN
- Deputy Commander: Lt Gen Michael J. Lutton, USAF
- Command Senior Enlisted Leader: CSM Joann Naumann USA

Insignia
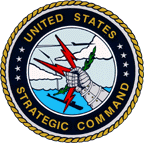
- pre-2002 seal

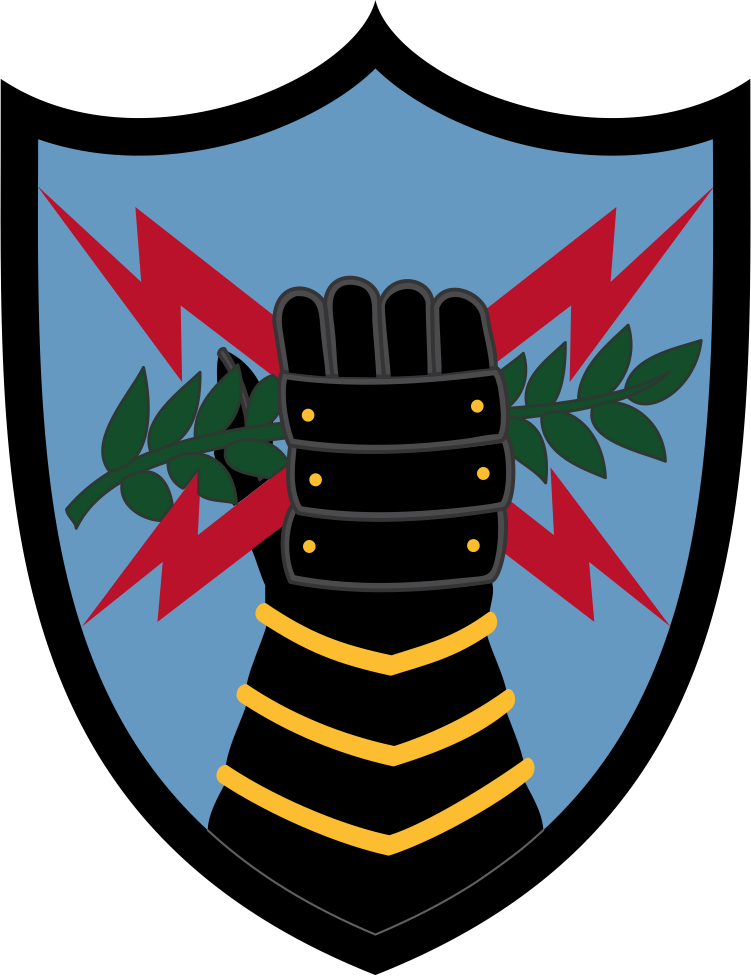
- Strategic Command Army Element SSI

The United States Strategic Command (USSTRATCOM or STRATCOM) is one of the eleven unified combatant commands in the United States Department of Defense. Headquartered at Offutt Air Force Base, Nebraska, USSTRATCOM is responsible for strategic nuclear deterrence, global strike, and operating the Defense Department's Global Information Grid. It also provides a host of capabilities to support the other combatant commands, including integrated missile defense; and global command, control, communications, computers, intelligence, surveillance, and reconnaissance (C4ISR). This command exists to give "national leadership a unified resource for greater understanding of specific threats around the world and the means to respond to those threats rapidly".

== Mission statement ==
USSTRATCOM employs nuclear, cyber, global strike, joint electronic warfare, missile defense, and intelligence capabilities to deter aggression, decisively and accurately respond if deterrence fails, assure allies, shape adversary behavior, defeat terror, and define the force of the future.

== Priorities ==
- Strategic deterrence
- Decisive response
- A combat-ready force

== Commander's intent ==
- Embrace strategic deterrence, consisting of innovative joint fighting forces integrated and synchronized in multiple domains to ensure national security.
- Ensure a decisive response to aggression, against any threat, when called upon by civilian national leadership.
- Anticipate and meet tactical, theater, and strategic demands through operational plans and capability development.
- Develop the next generation of people and capabilities in order to prevail in future conflicts.

== Headquarters organizational structure ==
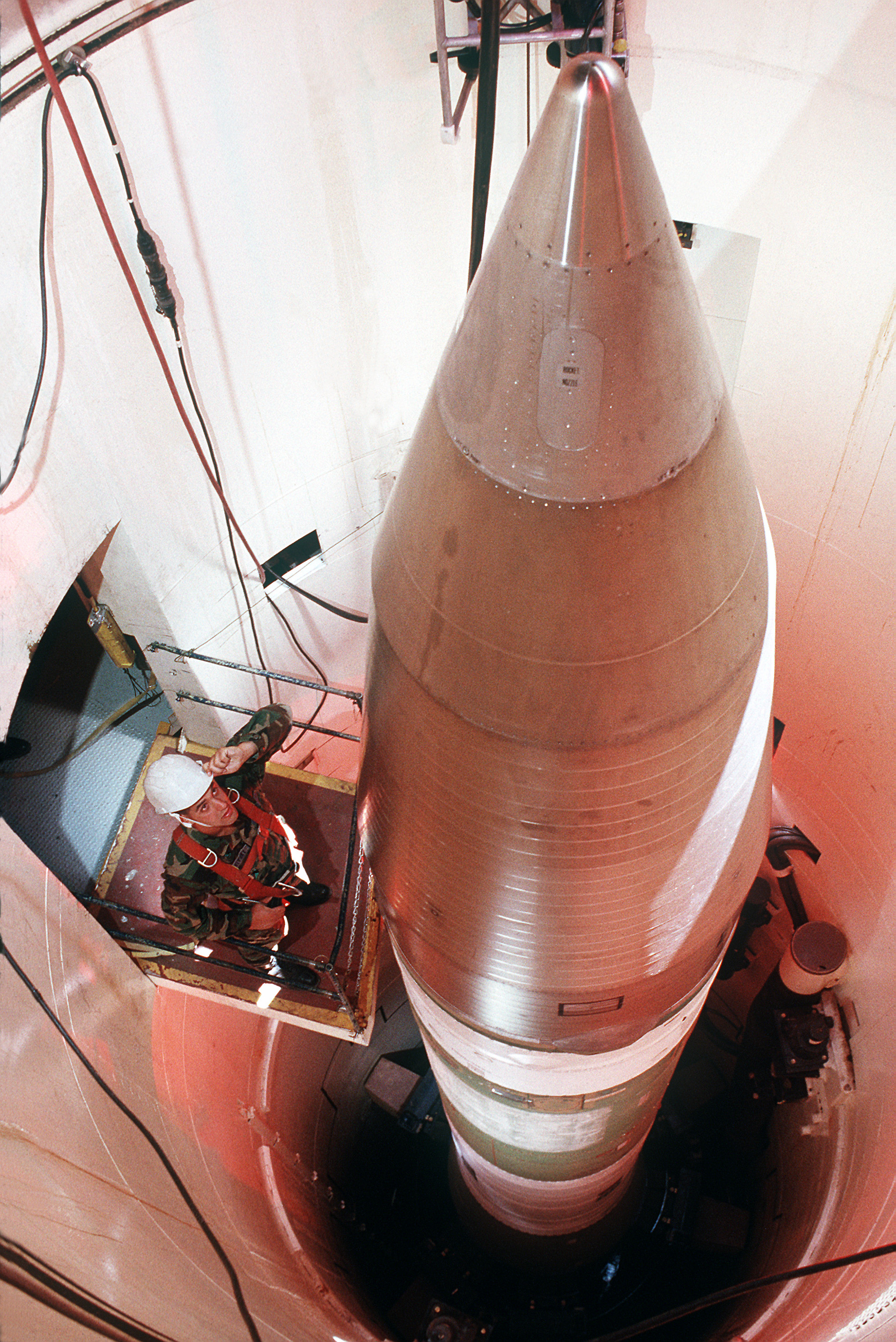
A Minuteman III ICBM in its missile silo

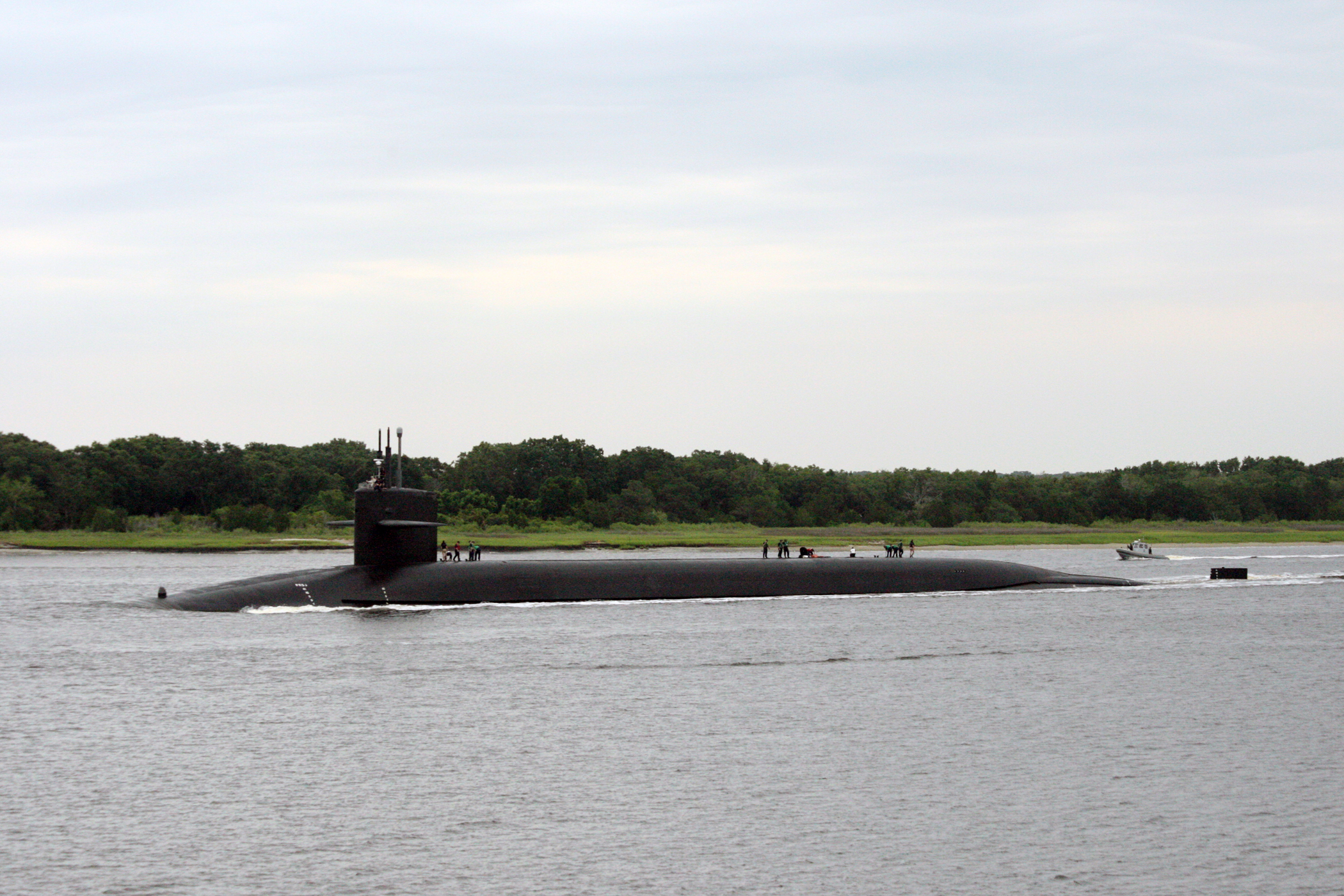
USS West Virginia, an Ohio-class nuclear-powered submarine

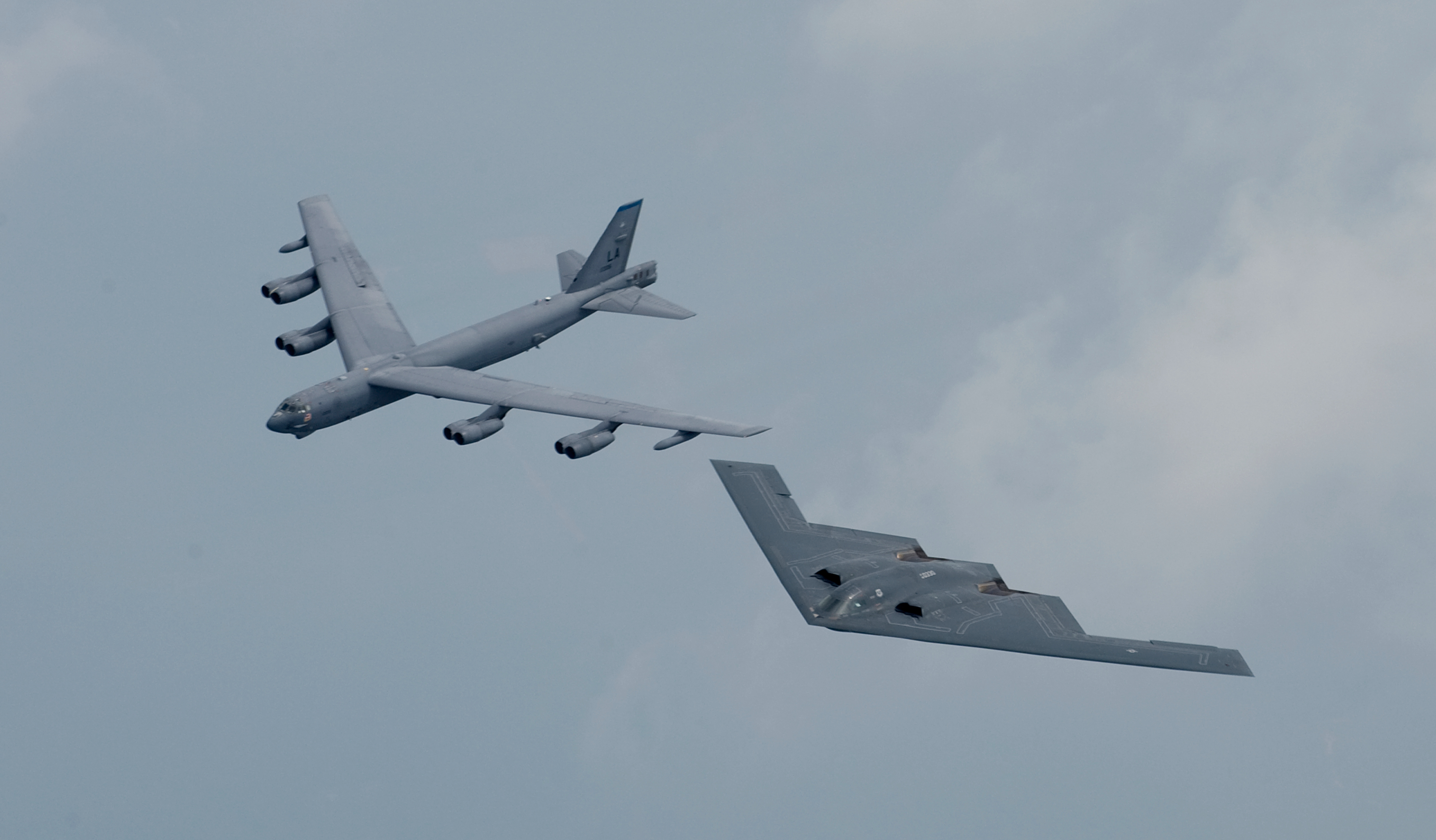
B-52 and B-2 bombers flying in formation

- J1 – Human Capital: Develops and administers command manpower and personnel policies, human resources, and personnel assignment programs.
- J2 – Intelligence: Responsible for delivering all-source intelligence while enabling the execution of assigned strategic deterrence, space and cyberspace operations. Directs all intelligence-related support for the commander and ensures unity of intelligence effort across the Command.
- J3 – Global Operations: Coordinates the planning, employment and operation of DoD strategic assets and combines all current operations, intelligence, and global command and control operations. Subdivisions within J3 include Combat and Information Operations, Current Operations, Logistics, and Joint Electromagnetic Spectrum Operations (JEMSO).
- J4 – Logistics: The Logistics Directorate plans, coordinates and executes joint logistics functions, and provides capability-based readiness assessments and facilities management in support of U.S. Strategic Command's global mission.
- J5 – Plans and Policy: Responsible for coordinating the development and implementation of national security policy as it applies to the command and the execution of its mission. Develops future plans, policy and strategy across all mission areas as outlined in the Unified Command Plan.
- J6 – C4 Systems: Coordinates, facilitates, monitors and assesses systems, networks and communications requirements.
- J7 – Joint Exercises, Training and Assessments: Manages the USSTRATCOM commander's Joint Exercises, Training, and Assessments programs in order to ensure readiness to perform the Command missions. Provides modeling and simulation support for exercises and training events to the Joint Chiefs of Staff (JCS), Combatant Commands, and other Major Commands (MAJCOM). Manages the Joint Lessons Learned Program. Augments the battle staff during a crisis.
- J8 – Capability and Resource Integration: Conducts force management and analysis to include integrating, coordinating, prioritizing, and advocating USSTRATCOM future concepts, mission capability needs, weapons system development, support for emerging technologies, and command and control architecture across the mission areas. Responsible for all command requirement processes, and ensures appropriate decision support tools and assessment processes are in place to enhance operational capabilities.

== Organizational structure ==
=== Component Commands ===
Emblem	Command (Acronym)	Commander	Established	Headquarters	Subordinate Commands
	U.S. Army Space and Missile Defense Command	Lt General John L. Rafferty Jr.	1 October 1997	Redstone Arsenal, Alabama	100th Missile Defense Brigade
	U.S. Fleet Forces Command (USSF); Joint Force Maritime Component Command	Admiral; Karl O. Thomas; U.S. Navy	1 January 1906	Naval Support Activity Hampton Roads, Virginia	Submarine Force Atlantic
	Air Force Global Strike Command (AFGSC); Joint Force Air Component Command	General; Stephen L. Davis; U.S. Air Force	15 December 1944	Barksdale Air Force Base, Louisiana	Eighth Air Force; Twentieth Air Force
	Marine Corps Forces Strategic Command (MARFORSTRAT)	Lt. General; Melvin G. Carter; U.S. Marine Corps	1 October 2003	Offutt Air Force Base, Nebraska	

== Command posts ==
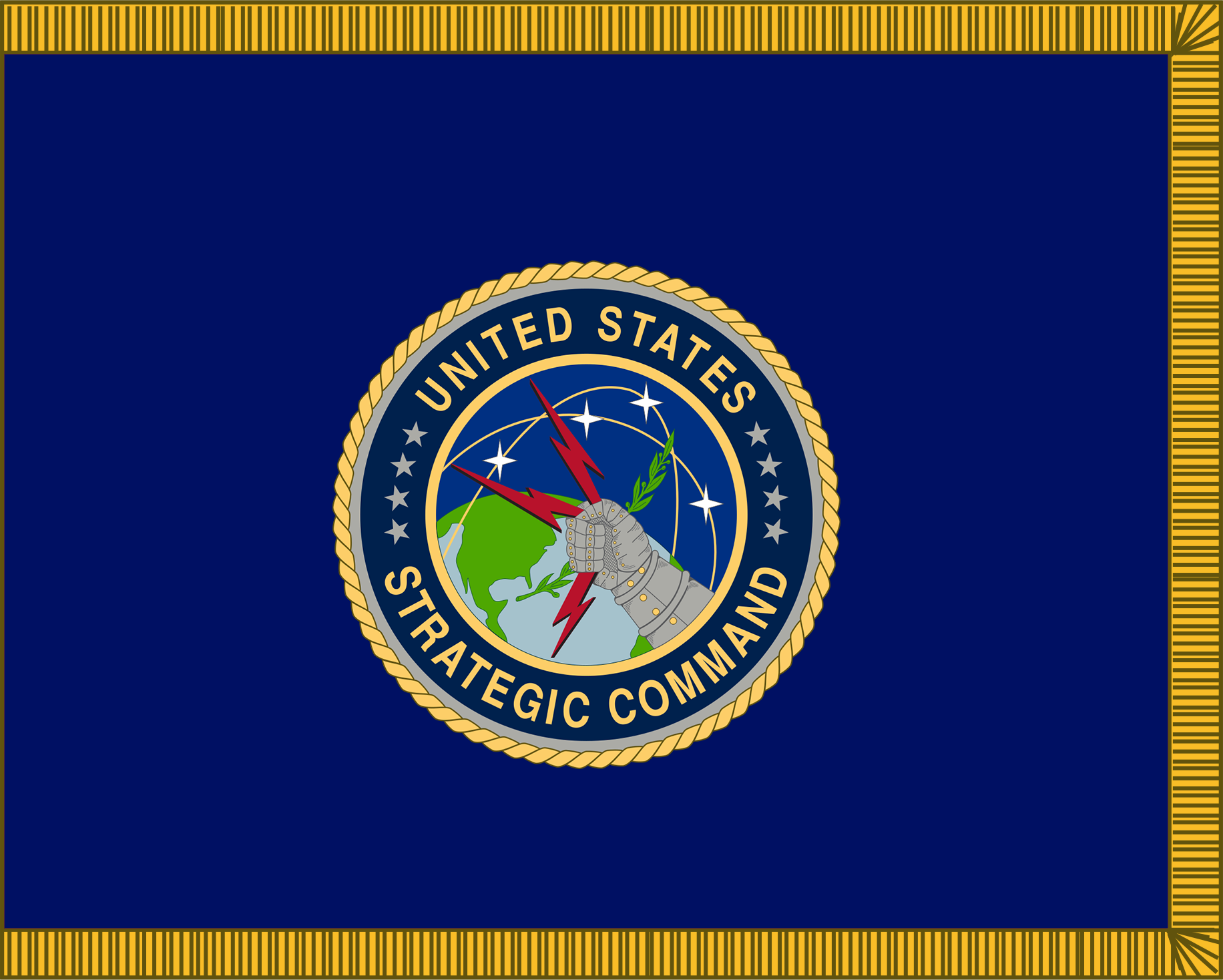
US Strategic Command Flag

The Global Operations Center, or GOC, is the nerve center for USSTRATCOM. The GOC is responsible for the global situational awareness of the commander, USSTRATCOM, and is the mechanism by which he exercises operational command and control of the Nation's global strategic forces.

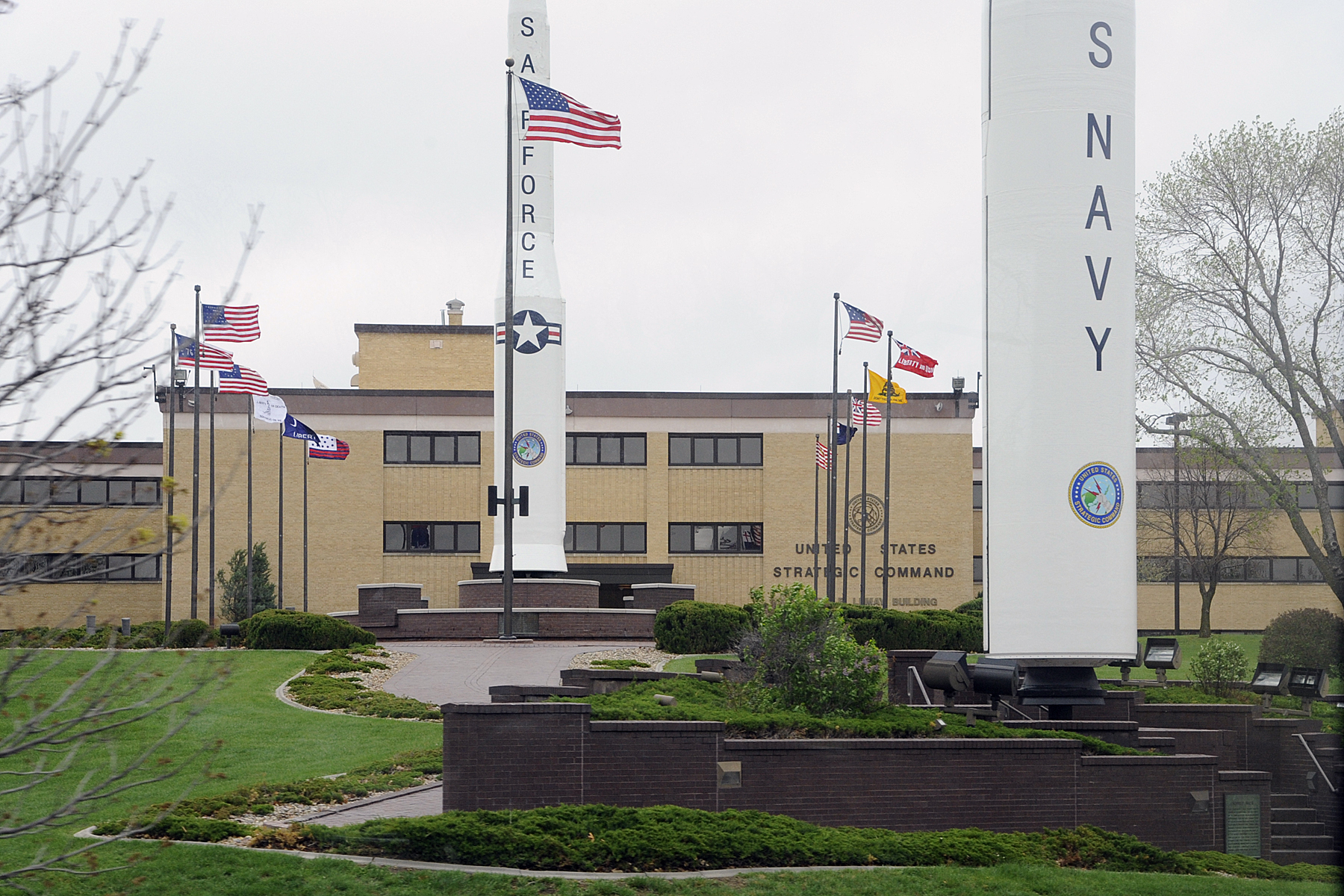
Gen. Curtis E. LeMay Building, U.S. Strategic Command Headquarters

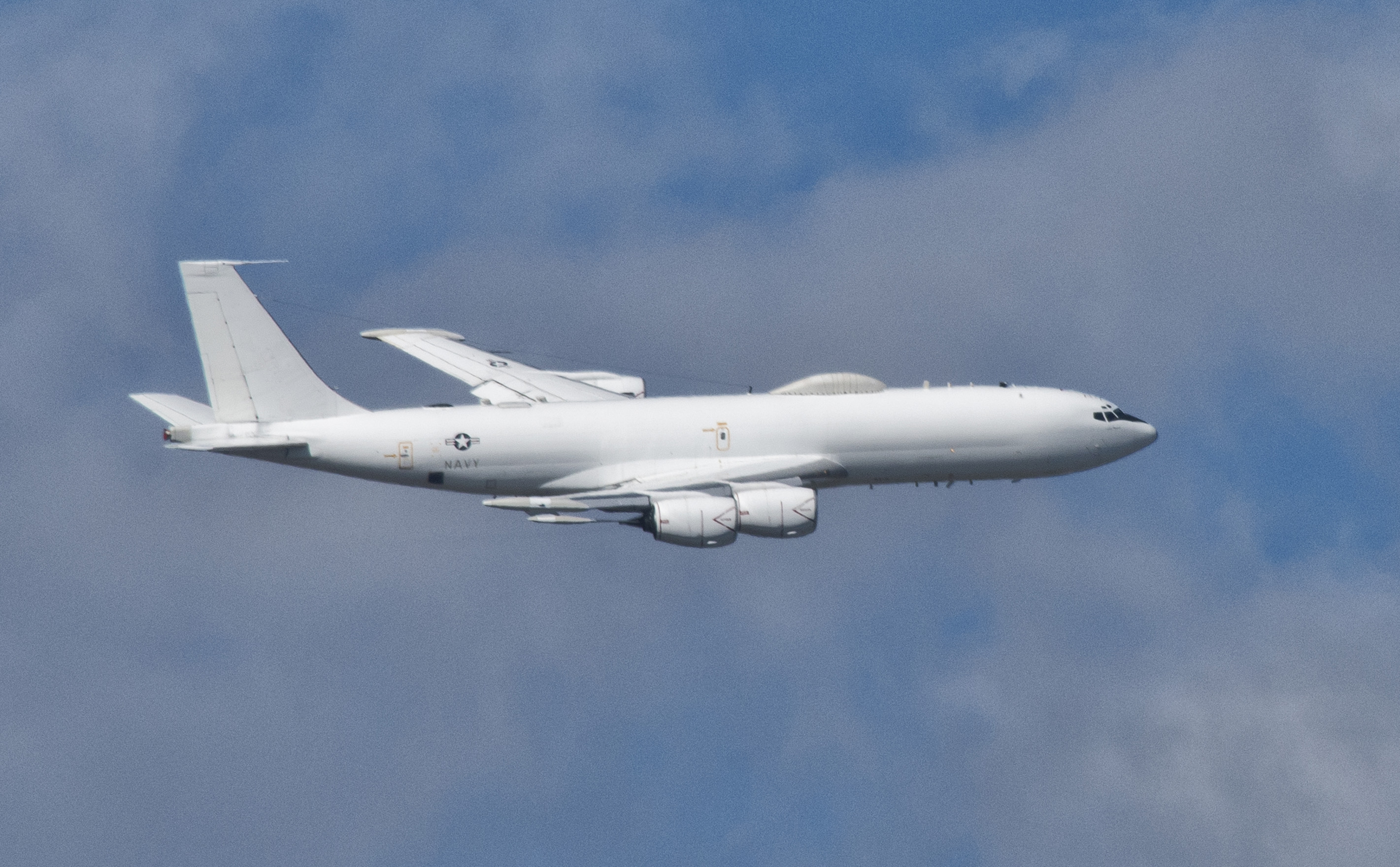
E-6B Mercury, USSTRATCOM ABNCP

The Alternate Processing and Correlation Center in the USSTRATCOM Underground Command Complex at Offutt AFB provides an alternate missile warning correlation center to the Cheyenne Mountain Missile Warning Center. It is the prime source of missile warning data for USSTRATCOM for force survival and force management. The facility consists of the integration of the SCIS, CSSR, and CCPDS-R systems and also upgrade equipment and communications links.

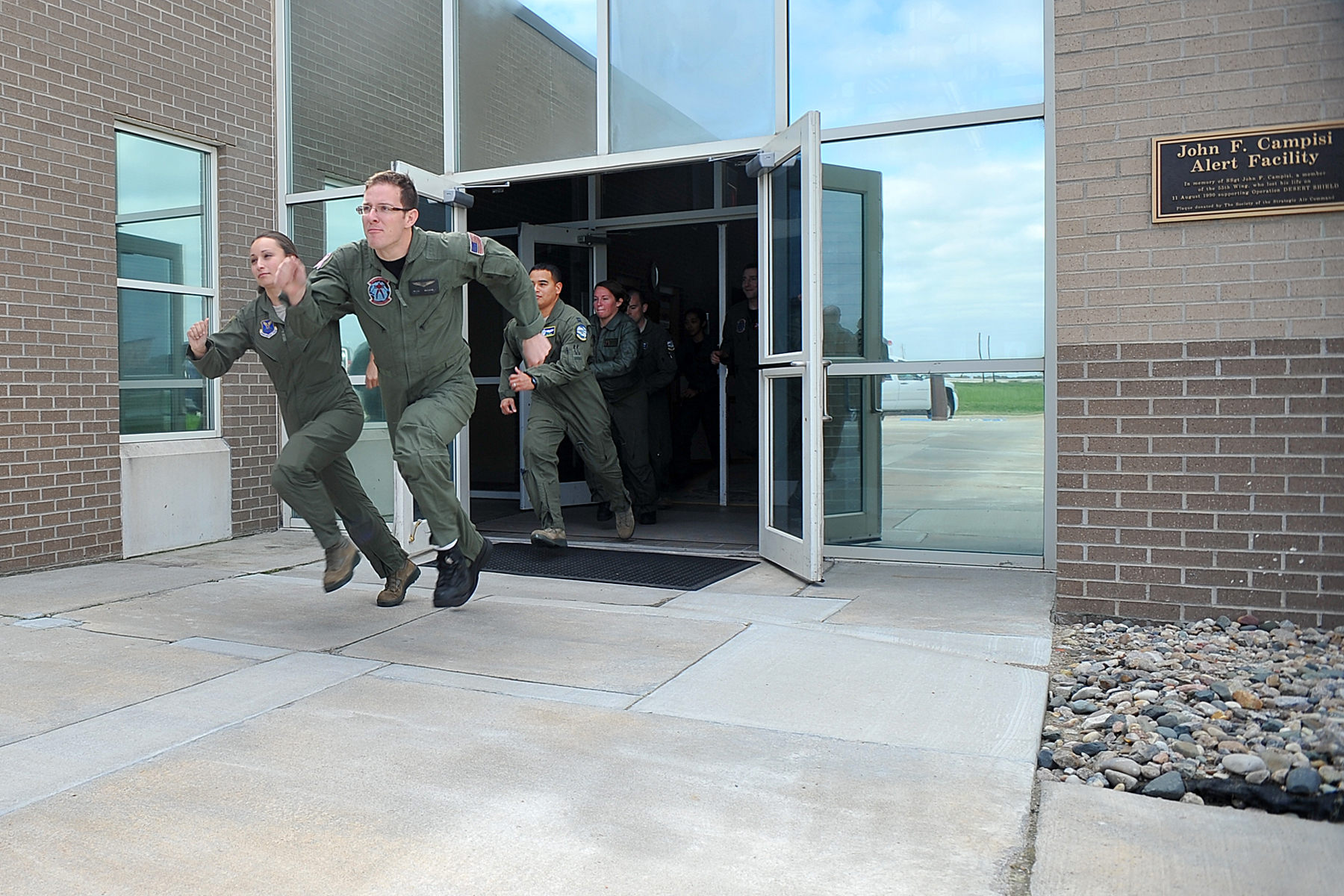
USSTRATCOM Airborne Command Post crew members responding to their aircraft during an alert response exercise

U.S. Strategic Command's Airborne Command Post (ABNCP), also called "Looking Glass", allows USSTRATCOM the ability to command, control, and communicate with its nuclear forces should ground-based command centers become inoperable.

== History ==
USSTRATCOM was originally formed in 1992, as a successor to Strategic Air Command in response to the end of the Cold War and a new vision of nuclear warfare in U.S. defense policy. Department of Defense changes in command structure due to the Goldwater–Nichols Act of 1986, led to a single command responsible for all strategic nuclear weapons. As a result, USSTRATCOM's principal mission was to deter military attack, and if deterrence failed, to counter with nuclear weapons.

Throughout its history, it has drawn from important contributions from many different organizations stretching back to World War II. Providing national leadership with a single command responsible for all strategic nuclear forces, General George Butler, in establishing the new command, borrowed from the work of General Curtis LeMay, an early commander of Strategic Air Command. LeMay was a very vocal advocate for a strong national defense, particularly as regards nuclear weapons.

Being a Unified Command, another major concern for Gen. Butler was interservice rivalry, having soldiers, sailors, airmen and marines in one command. There had been decades of rivalry between the branches of the U.S. military regarding control of nuclear weapons. Even though a compromise had established the Joint Strategic Target Planning Staff, there were systemic and institutional problems that could not be overcome.

USSTRATCOM was re-structured 1 October 2002 by Secretary of Defense Donald Rumsfeld. It was now to merge with the United States Space Command and assume all duties for full-spectrum global strike, operational space support, integrated missile defense, and global Command, Control, Communications, Computers, Intelligence, Surveillance and Reconnaissance (C^{4}ISR) and specialized planning. Its duties now include intelligence and cyber support as well as monitoring orbiting satellites and space debris.

In February 2008, USSTRATCOM succeeded in destroying a satellite, USA193, about to re-enter the Earth's atmosphere.

USSTRATCOM also supported United States Africa Command's 2011 military intervention in Libya in a variety of ways, including long-range conventional strikes and intelligence, surveillance and reconnaissance (ISR).

An intention by the U.S. Air Force to create a 'cyber command' was announced in October 2006. On 21 May 2010, part of USSTRATCOM's responsibility regarding cyber-warfare operations was spun off into a 10th Unified Command, the United States Cyber Command. As a result, USSTRATCOM's Joint Task Force-Global Network Operations (JTF-GNO) and Joint Functional Component Command – Network Warfare (JFCC-NW) were disestablished.

== List of combatant commanders ==
No.	Commander		Term			Service branch
No.	Portrait	Name	Took office	Left office	Term length	Service branch
1	George L. Butler	General; George L. Butler (born 1939)	1 June 1992	14 February 1994	1 year, 258 days	U.S. Air Force
2	Henry G. Chiles Jr.	Admiral; Henry G. Chiles Jr. (born 1938)	14 February 1994	21 February 1996	2 years, 7 days	U.S. Navy
3	Eugene E. Habiger	General; Eugene E. Habiger (1939–2022)	21 February 1996	1 August 1998	2 years, 161 days	U.S. Air Force
4	Richard W. Mies	Admiral; Richard W. Mies (born 1944)	1 August 1998	30 November 2001	3 years, 121 days	U.S. Navy
5	James O. Ellis Jr.	Admiral; James O. Ellis Jr. (born 1947)	30 November 2001	9 July 2004	2 years, 222 days	U.S. Navy
-	James E. Cartwright	Lieutenant General; James E. Cartwright (born 1949); Acting	9 July 2004	1 September 2004	54 days	U.S. Marine Corps
6	James E. Cartwright	General; James E. Cartwright (born 1949)	1 September 2004	10 August 2007	2 years, 343 days	U.S. Marine Corps
-	C. Robert Kehler	Lieutenant General; C. Robert Kehler (born 1952); Acting	10 August 2007	3 October 2007	54 days	U.S. Air Force
7	Kevin P. Chilton	General; Kevin P. Chilton (born 1954)	3 October 2007	28 January 2011	3 years, 117 days	U.S. Air Force
8	C. Robert Kehler	General; C. Robert Kehler (born 1952)	28 January 2011	15 November 2013	2 years, 291 days	U.S. Air Force
9	Cecil D. Haney	Admiral; Cecil D. Haney (born 1955)	15 November 2013	3 November 2016	2 years, 354 days	U.S. Navy
10	John E. Hyten	General; John E. Hyten (born 1959)	3 November 2016	18 November 2019	3 years, 15 days	U.S. Air Force
11	Charles A. Richard	Admiral; Charles A. Richard (born 1959)	18 November 2019	9 December 2022	3 years, 21 days	U.S. Navy
12	Anthony J. Cotton	General; Anthony J. Cotton	9 December 2022	5 December 2025	2 years, 361 days	U.S. Air Force
13	Richard A. Correll	Admiral; Richard A. Correll	5 December 2025	Incumbent	341 days	U.S. Navy

== See also ==
- Nuclear weapons and the United States
