= USS Sea Devil (SSN-664) =

Submarine of the United States

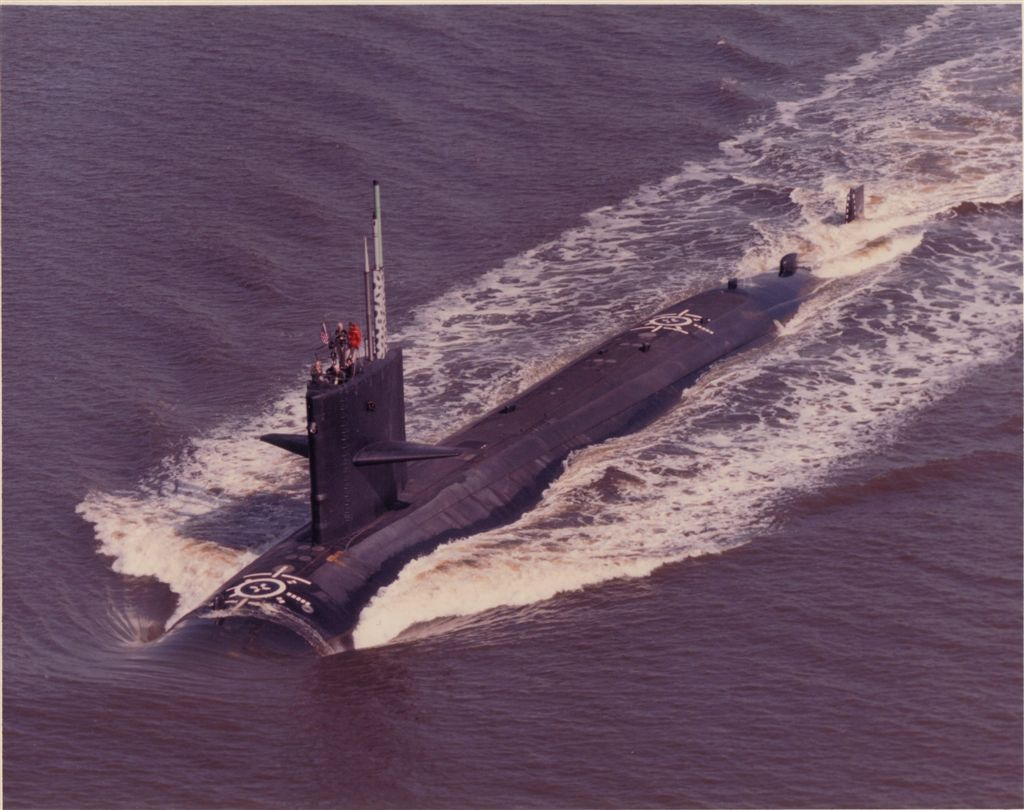
- USS Sea Devil (SSN-664), in the Cooper River heading to her sea trials after overhaul in Charleston, SC in 1983

History

United States
- Name: USS Sea Devil
- Namesake: The sea devil (Manta birostria), also known as the manta ray and devil ray
- Ordered: 28 May 1964
- Builder: Newport News Shipbuilding and Dry Dock Company, Newport News, Virginia
- Laid down: 12 April 1966
- Launched: 5 October 1967
- Sponsored by: Mrs. Ignatius J. Galantin
- Commissioned: 30 January 1969
- Decommissioned: 16 October 1991
- Stricken: 16 October 1991
- Fate: Scrapping via Ship and Submarine Recycling Program begun 1 March 1998, completed 7 September 1999

General characteristics
- Class & type: Sturgeon-class attack submarine
- Displacement: 3,860 long tons (3,922 t) light; 4,268 long tons (4,336 t) full; 408 long tons (415 t) dead
- Length: 292 ft 3 in (89.08 m)
- Beam: 31 ft 8 in (9.65 m)
- Draft: 28 ft 8 in (8.74 m)
- Installed power: 15,000 shaft horsepower (11.2 megawatts)
- Propulsion: One S5W nuclear reactor, two steam turbines, one screw
- Speed: 15 knots (28 km/h; 17 mph) surfaced; 25 knots (46 km/h; 29 mph) submerged
- Test depth: 1,300 feet (400 meters)
- Complement: 108
- Armament: 4 × 21-inch (533 mm) torpedo tubes

USS Sea Devil (SSN-664), a Sturgeon-class attack submarine, was the second ship of the United States Navy to be named for the sea devil (Manta birostria), also known as the manta ray or devil ray, the largest of all living rays, noted for power and endurance.

== Construction and commissioning ==
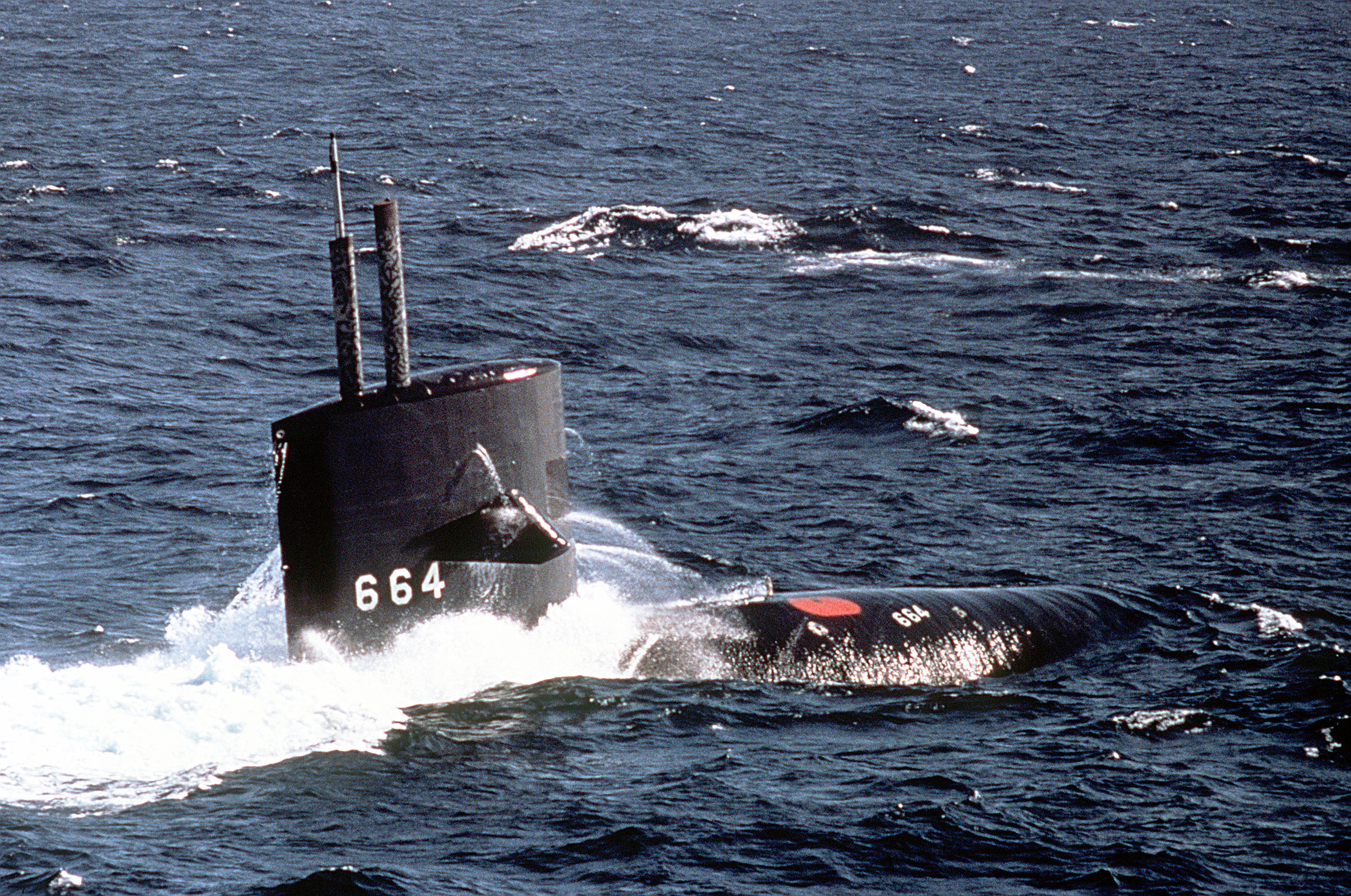
Sea Devil off the Virginia Capes on 1 February 1991.

The contract to build Sea Devil was awarded to Newport News Shipbuilding and Dry Dock Company in Newport News, Virginia. on 28 May 1964, and her keel was laid down there on 12 April 1966. The construction was fairly uneventful, except a short delay. She was launched on 5 October 1967, sponsored by Mrs. Ignatius J. Galantin, the wife of Admiral Ignatius J. "Pete" Galantin (1910-2004), and commissioned on 30 January 1969. She went under sea trials on 26 January after several finishing touches.

== Service history ==
Sea Devil was assigned to Submarine Division 62 at Norfolk, Virginia. She operated out of Norfolk into at least 1977. She was assigned to Submarine Squadron 4 in Charleston SC from the mid-1980s until her decommissioning in 1991. She was a 637 class fast attack hunter killer. She also surfaced multiple times through the ice in the arctic. She usually patrolled the far north Atlantic, monitoring Russian vessels and ports. It went on several submarine stalking missions, watching Russian submarines carefully. It eventually became outdated and was taken out of service for repairs in 1981.

== Decommissioning and disposal ==
Sea Devil was decommissioned on 16 October 1991 and stricken from the Naval Vessel Register the same day. Her scrapping via the Nuclear-Powered Ship and Submarine Recycling Program at Puget Sound Naval Shipyard in Bremerton, Washington, began on 1 March 1998 and was completed on 7 September 1999. The nuclear fuel was stored there until 2001 and then was transferred to The Naval Reactors Facility in Idaho.
