= Global Information Grid =

Communications project of the United States Department of Defense

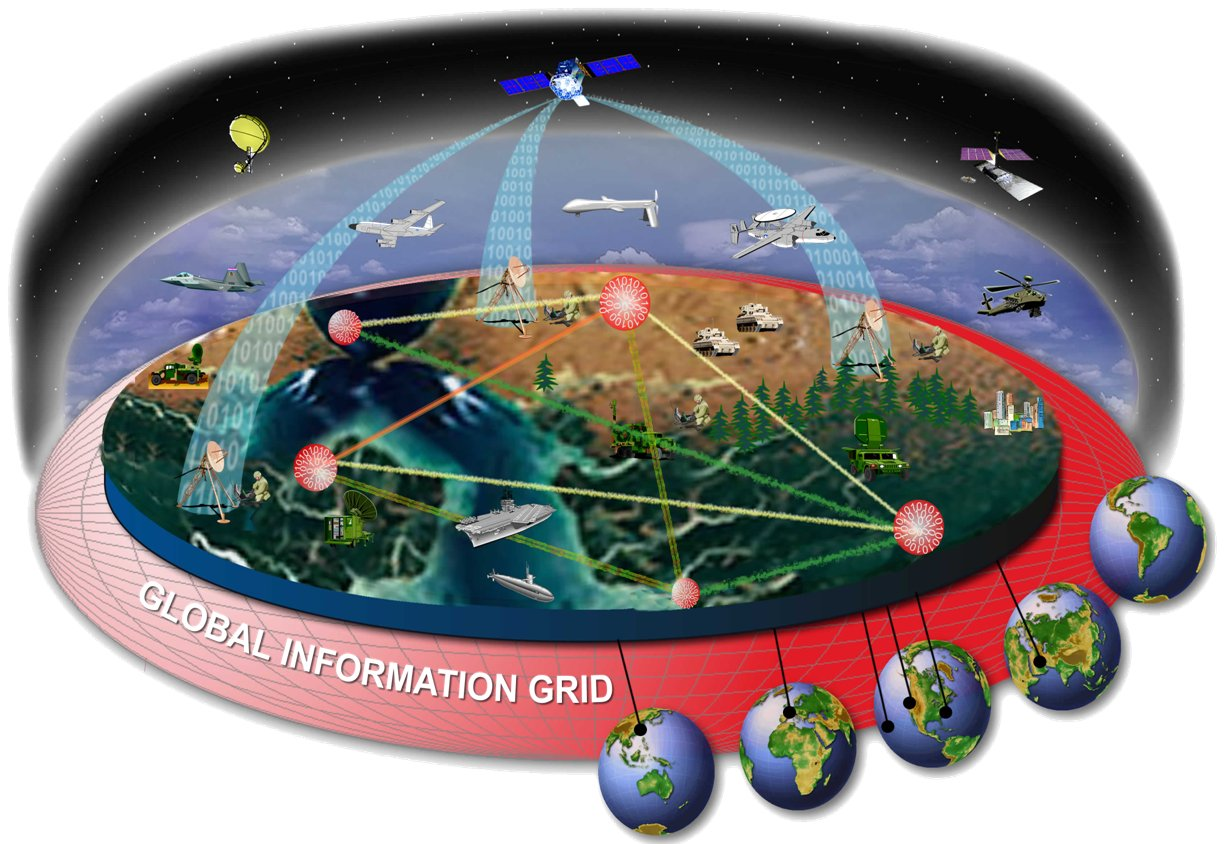
Schematic view of the Global Information Grid. The GIG includes any DoD system, equipment, software, or service that transmits, stores, or processes DoD information, and any other associated services necessary to achieve information superiority.

The Global Information Grid (GIG), now referred to as the Department of Defense Information Network (DODIN), refers to the entire network of information transmission and processing capabilities maintained by the United States Department of Defense (DoD). It is a worldwide network of information transmission, of associated processes, and of personnel serving to collect, process, safeguard, transmit, and manage this information. It is an all-encompassing communications project of the Department of Defense. The GIG makes this immediately available to military personnel, to those responsible for military politics, and for support personnel. It includes all infrastructure, bought or loaned, of communications, electronics, informatics (including software and databases), and security. It is the most visible manifestation of network-centric warfare. It is the combination of technology and human activity that enables warfighters to access information on demand.

It is defined as a "globally interconnected, end-to-end set of information capabilities for collecting, processing, storing, disseminating, and managing information on demand to warfighters, policy makers, and support personnel".

The GIG includes owned and leased communications and computing systems and services, software (including applications), data, security services, other associated services, and National Security Systems. Non-GIG information technology (IT) includes stand-alone, self-contained, or embedded IT that is not, and will not be, connected to the enterprise network.

This new definition removes references to the National Security Systems as defined in section 5142 of the Clinger-Cohen Act of 1996. Further, this new definition removes the references to the GIG providing capabilities from all operating locations (bases, posts, camps, stations, facilities, mobile platforms, and deployed sites). And lastly, this definition removes the part of the definition that discusses the interfaces to coalition, allied, and non-Department of Defense users and systems.

The DoD's use of the term "GIG" is undergoing changes as the Department deals with new concepts such as Cyberspace Operations, GIG 2.0 (A Joint Staff J6 Initiative), and the Department of Defense Information Enterprise (DIE).

The GIG is managed by a construct known as NetOps. NetOps is defined as the operational framework consisting of three essential tasks, Situational Awareness (SA), and Command & Control (C2) that the Commander (CDR) of United States Strategic Command (USSTRATCOM), in coordination with DoD and Global NetOps Community, employs to operate and defend the GIG to ensure information superiority.

== In the past ==
The specifications for the GIG were published by the DoD on 22 September 1999, and the assistant secretary of defense officially mandated it on 19 September 2002 to carry out the project. Although in 2008, the ambitious objectives of the program had not been realized, informatic communications between soldiers and commanders on the battlefield had been successfully realized, the most well-known examples having occurred during the 2003 invasion of Iraq.

The GIG underwent a severe cyberattack in 2008, in the form of a computer virus which spread through military computer networks. As a result, the US Strategic Command banned all forms of removable media, including thumb drives, DVDs, and floppy disks. At the time, the GIG contained about 17 million military computers, and it was scanned millions of times daily.

== Defense Information Enterprise ==
The Department of Defense Information Enterprise is defined as the DoD information resources, assets, and processes required to achieve an information advantage and share information across the Department of Defense and with mission partners.

It includes:

- the information itself and the Department's management over the information life cycle
- the processes, including risk management, associated with managing information to accomplish the DoD mission and functions
- activities related to designing, building, populating, acquiring, managing, operating, protecting, and defending the information enterprise
- related information resources such as personnel, funds, equipment, and IT, including national security systems

== Vision ==
The Network-Centric Warfare (NCW) doctrine represents a fundamental shift in military culture, away from compartmentalized war machines and toward interconnected units operating cohesively. The tenets of Network Centric Warfare are:

- A robustly networked force improves information sharing;
- Information sharing enhances the quality of information and shared situational awareness;
- Shared situational awareness enables collaboration and self-synchronization and enhances sustainability and speed of command;
- Speed of command, in turn, dramatically increases mission effectiveness.

At the enterprise level, forging new paths with whom components of the military communicate will ease logistics burdens, improve communication and combat effectiveness of the war fighter, decrease instances of confusion-related fratricide, accelerate the trend in minimizing collateral damage, and hasten the flow of business. For the warfighter, situational awareness would be improved tremendously by linking what he sees with what an overhead satellite sees.

The fog of war would be lifted by seamless communication between unit members, off site detection devices, and commanders operating behind the line. Improved coordination may also assist in delivering appropriate firepower or other tangible assets to first responders during domestic attacks and natural disasters worldwide.

== See also ==
- Defense Information Systems Agency
- Global Information Network Architecture
- Information Assurance Vulnerability Alert
- Joint Battlespace Infosphere
- JTF-GNO
- Software Defined Perimeter
- Skynet (Terminator)
