= Joint Battlespace Infosphere =

The Joint Battlespace Infosphere is a project funded by the AFRL (Air Force Research Lab) intended to provide management for network-centric warfare systems that utilize the GIG (Global Information Grid).
