= 379th Expeditionary Operations Group =

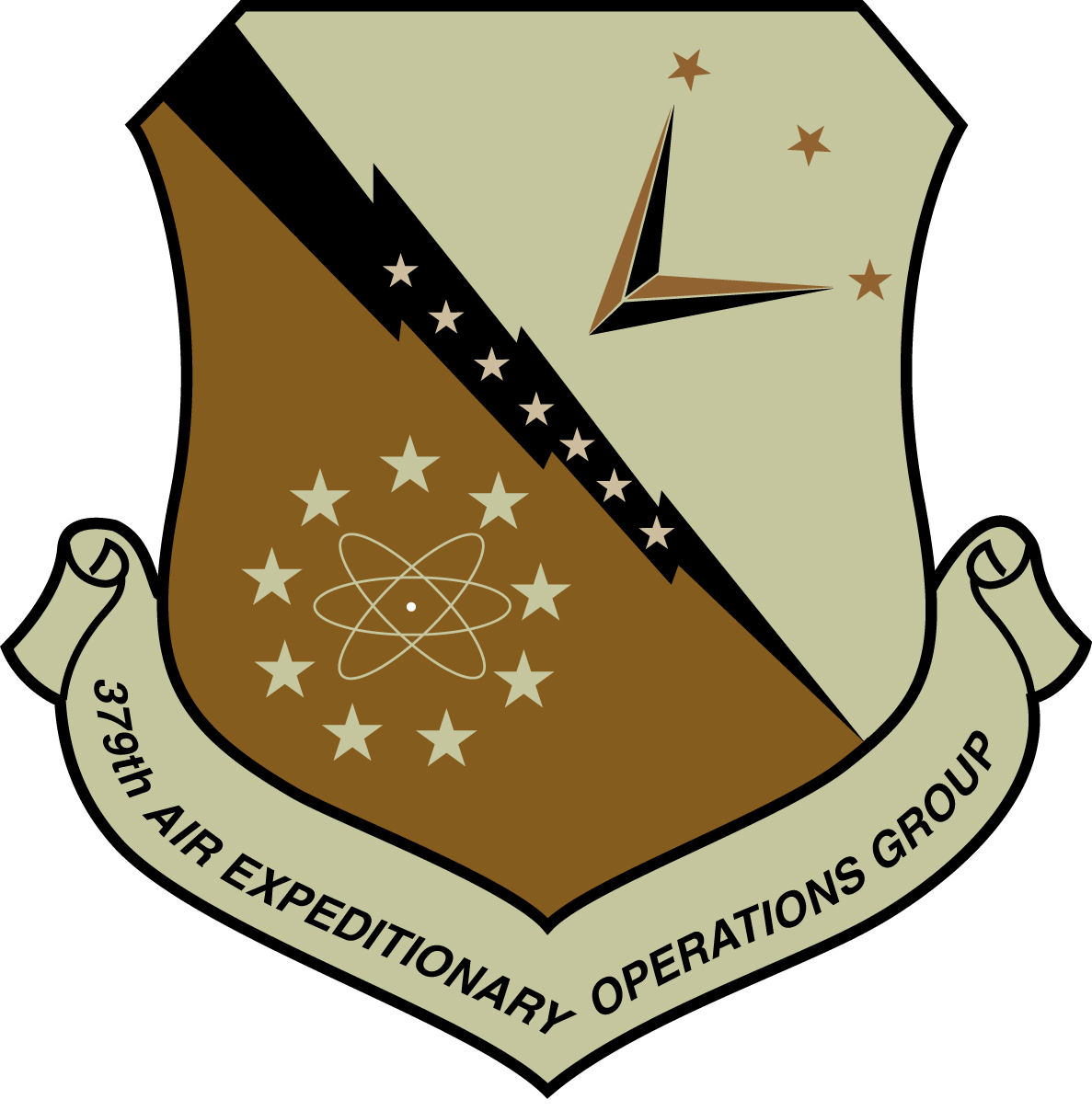
- Emblem of the 379th Expeditionary Operations Group
- Active: 1942–1945; 2003–present
- Country: United States
- Branch: United States Air Force

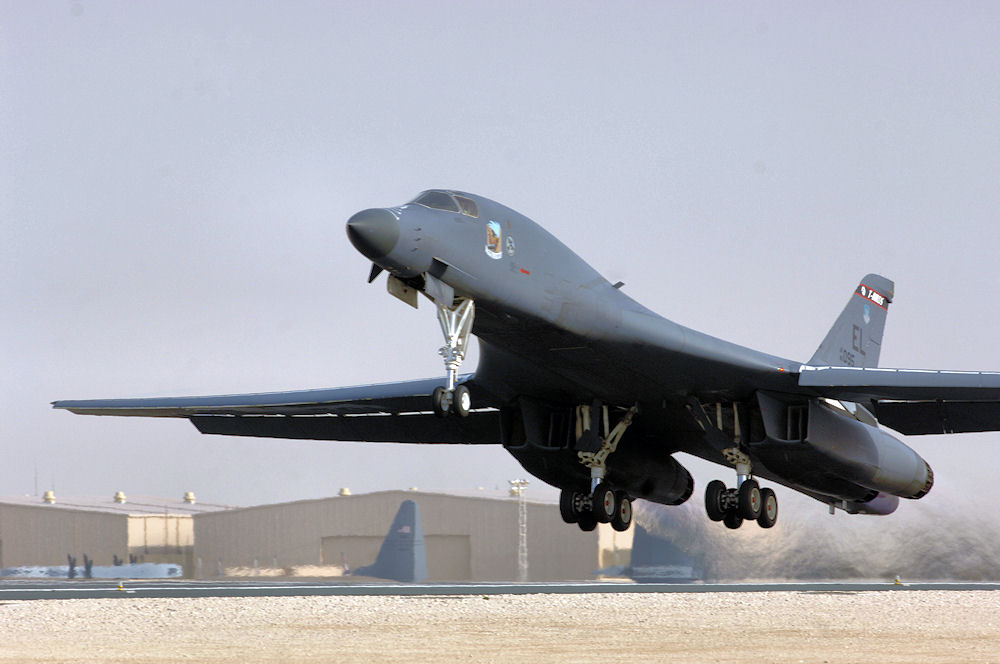
A B-1B Bomber takes off from the 379th Air Expeditionary Wing. B-1s from the 34th Expeditionary Bomb Squadron were once again called on to increase operations in support of ground forces in Afghanistan through precision bombing and shows of force and presence.

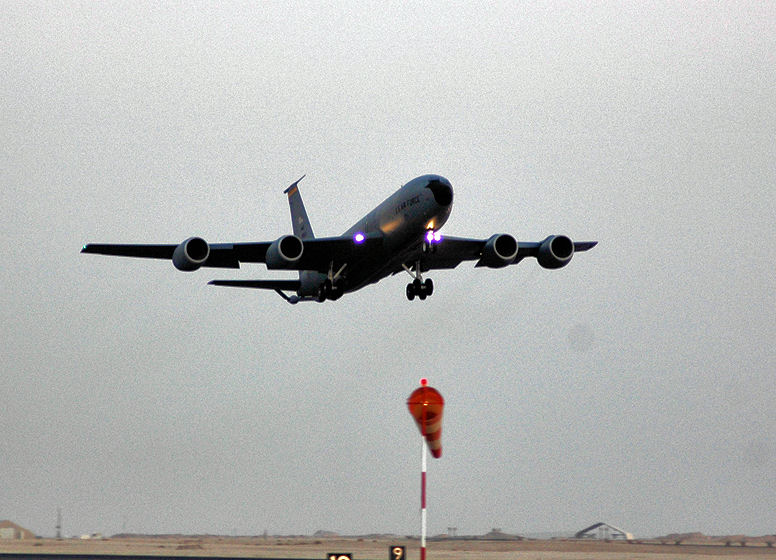
A KC-135 Stratotanker operated by the 340th Expeditionary Air Refueling Squadron takes off on a flight

The 379th Expeditionary Operations Group is a provisional United States Air Force unit assigned to the United States Air Forces Central. It is the flying component of the 379th Air Expeditionary Wing, stationed at Al Udeid AB, Qatar. The Group is the flying component of the 379th Air Expeditionary Wing, with more than 90 combat and support attached aircraft, including eight coalition airframes. Aircraft come from every US service, the United Kingdom, and Australia.

The group was first activated in September 1991 as part of the Objective Wing reorganization of the Air Force. It deployed crews and aircraft to support Desert Storm before inactivating in December 1993.

== Assigned units ==
- 7th Expeditionary Airborne Command and Control Squadron (E-8)
- 340th Expeditionary Air Refueling Squadron (KC-135)
- 379th Expeditionary Aeromedical Evacuation Squadron
- 379th Expeditionary Operations Support Squadron
- 746th Expeditionary Airlift Squadron (C-130H/J, C-21)
- 763d Expeditionary Reconnaissance Squadron (RC-135)
- 816th Expeditionary Airlift Squadron (C-17)

== History ==
The group was activated at Wurtsmith Air Force Base, Michigan in September 1991 as the Air Force converted its units to the Objective Wing organization. During Desert Storm it deployed aircrew and aircraft to the Middle East. Wurtsmith closed on 30 June 1993 as a result of the 1991 Base Realignment and Closure (BRAC) process, which determined that the development of new weapons and long-range satellite surveillance systems rendered many installations unnecessary. On the morning of 15 December 1992, the last Boeing B-52G Stratofortress, serial 57-6492, the "Old Crow Express," was flown to Davis–Monthan Air Force Base, Arizona for storage. The group was inactivated two weeks later.

The group was reactivated in 2003 as the 379th Expeditionary Operations Group. Engaged in combat operations as part of the global war on terrorism.

== Lineage ==
- Established as the 379th Operations Group on 29 August 1991

Activated on 1 September 1991
Inactivated on 31 December 1992

- Redesignated 379th Expeditionary Operations Group and converted to provisional status on 4 December 2001

Activated in 2003

=== Assignments ===
- 379th Bombardment Wing, 1 September 1991 – 31 December 1993
- 379th Air Expeditionary Wing, 2003 – present

=== Components ===
- 379th Operations Support Squadron, 1 September 1991 – 31 December 1992
- 524th Bombardment Squadron, 1 September 1991 – 15 December 1992
- 763d Expeditionary Reconnaissance Squadron, 1998-present
- 816th Expeditionary Airlift Squadron
- 920th Air Refueling Squadron, 1 September 1991 – 1 June 1992

=== Stations ===
- Wurtsmith Air Force Base, Michigan, 1 September 1991 – 31 December 1993
- Al Udeid Air Base, Qatar, 2003 – present

=== Aircraft assigned ===
- Boeing B-52G Stratojet, 1991-1992
- RC-135 Rivet Joint – present
- E-8 JSTARS – present
- KC-135 Stratotanker, 1991-1992, – present
- C-130 Hercules – present
- C-21 – present
- B-1B Lancer – present
- Lockheed Martin F-22 Raptor, June 2019 - present
