= 420th Bombardment Squadron =

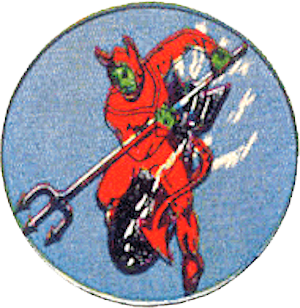
- Emblem of the 420th Bombardment Squadron
- Active: 1942–1946
- Country: United States
- Branch: United States Army Air Forces
- Type: Bombardment

The 420th Bombardment Squadron was unit in the United States Army Air Forces. Its last assignment was with 382d Bombardment Group stationed at Camp Anza, California. It was inactivated on 4 January 1946 without seeing combat.

== History ==
The squadron was activated in early 1942 as a B-24 Liberator reconnaissance unit. It was redesignated as a heavy bomber Operational Training Unit (OTU), later becoming a Replacement Training Unit (RTU) for deployed combat units, assigned to II Bomber Command, then to III Bomber Command in 1943. The squadron was inactivated in April 1944 when heavy bomber training ended.

The 420th Bombardment Squadron was redesignated as a B-29 Superfortress very heavy bombardment Squadron in August 1944. The squadron was trained under the Second Air Force. Training was considerably delayed due to equipment shortages. They received B-29 aircraft in Kansas in late spring 1945. The ground echelon deployed to Northern Mariana Islands by ship in early August 1945; air echelon remained at the last training base in Kansas after Japanese Capitulation. The ground echelon remained in Marianas supporting other units aircraft and demobilization; the air echelon demobilized with new B-29 aircraft remaining in Kansas, eventually being assigned to postwar units. The entire unit inactivated by December 1945.

On 19 September 1985 the 420th Bombardment Squadron(Very Heavy), (an Inactive Squadron, that was last active 4 January 1946), was consolidated with the 920th Air Refueling Squadron, Heavy. This action was directed by Department of the Air Force Letter DAF/MPM 662q Attachment 1 (Active Units), 19 September 1985.

== Lineage ==
- Constituted 30th Reconnaissance Squadron (Heavy) on 28 January 1942

Redesignated 420th Bombardment Squadron (Heavy) on 22 April 1942
Activated on 1 June 1942
Inactivated on 10 April 1944

- Redesignated 420th Bombardment Squadron (Very Heavy) on 4 August 1944

Activated on 19 September 1944
Inactivated on 4 January 1946

=== Assignments ===
- 302d Bombardment Group, 1 Jun 1942 – 10 Apr 1944
- 382d Bombardment Group, 19 Sep 1944 – 4 Jan 1946.

=== Stations ===
- Geiger Field, Washington, 1 June 1942
- Davis–Monthan Field, Arizona, 23 June 1942
- Wendover Field, Utah, 30 July 1942
- Pueblo Army Air Base, Colorado, 1 October 1942;
- Davis–Monthan Field, Arizona, 1 December 1942
- Clovis Army Air Field, New Mexico, 29 January 1943
- Langley Field, Virginia, 17 December 1943
- Chatham Army Airfield, Georgia, 10 Feb-io Apr 1944,
- Dalhart Army Air Field, Texas, 19 September 1944
- Smoky Hill Army Airfield, Kansas, 11 Dec 1944 – 1 Aug 1945
- Guam, 8 September 1945 (ground echelon only; air echelon remained in US until inactivation)
- Tinian, c. Oct-15 Dec 1945 (ground echelon only)
- Camp Anza, California, 28 Dec 1945 – 4 Jan 1946.

=== Aircraft ===
- B-24 Liberator, 1942–1944
- B-29 Superfortress, 1945
