= 464th Bombardment Squadron =

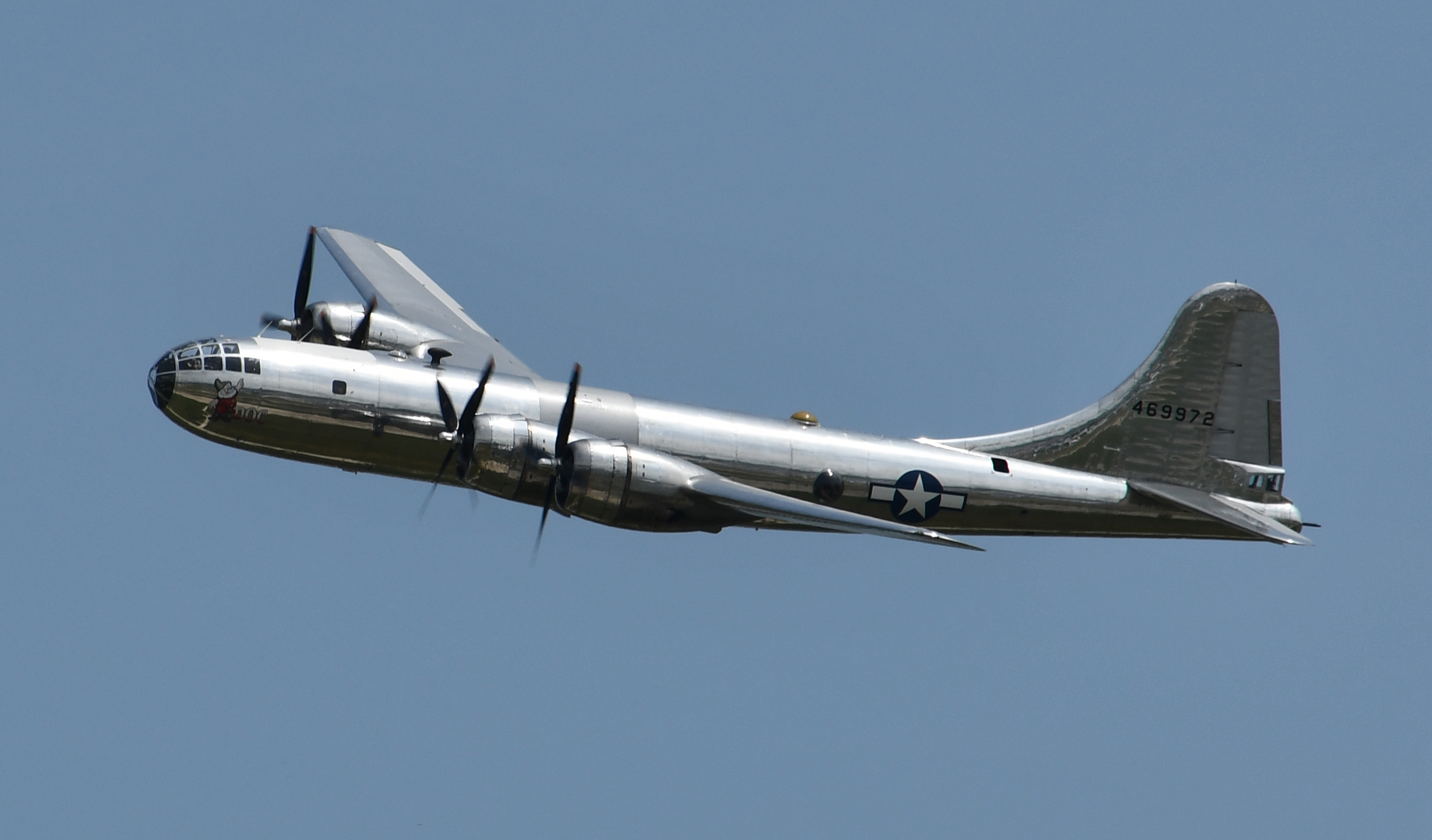
- B-29 Superfortress as flown by the squadron
- Active: 1942–1944; 1944–1946
- Country: United States
- Branch: United States Air Force
- Role: Bombardment
- Engagements: Pacific Ocean Theater

Insignia
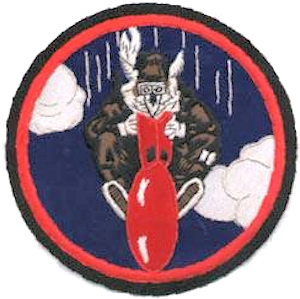
- Patch with 464th Bombardment Squadron emblem (Note: Approved 29 March 1943. Description: On a light blue disc, a gremlin attired in brown aviator's uniform, riding a red aerial bomb toward base between two white cloud formations, emitting speed lines proper.)

The 464th Bombardment Squadron is an inactive United States Air Force unit. Its last assignment was with the 382d Bombardment Group at Camp Anza, California, where it was inactivated on 4 January 1946. From activation in 1942 the squadron served as a replacement training unit for heavy bomber aircrews. It was inactivated in the spring of 1944 in a general reorganization of Army Air Forces training units. The squadron was activated again in September 1944 as a Boeing B-29 Superfortress unit. Its ground echelon deployed to the Pacific in 1945, but arrived too late to see combat.

== History ==
=== Heavy bomber replacement training ===
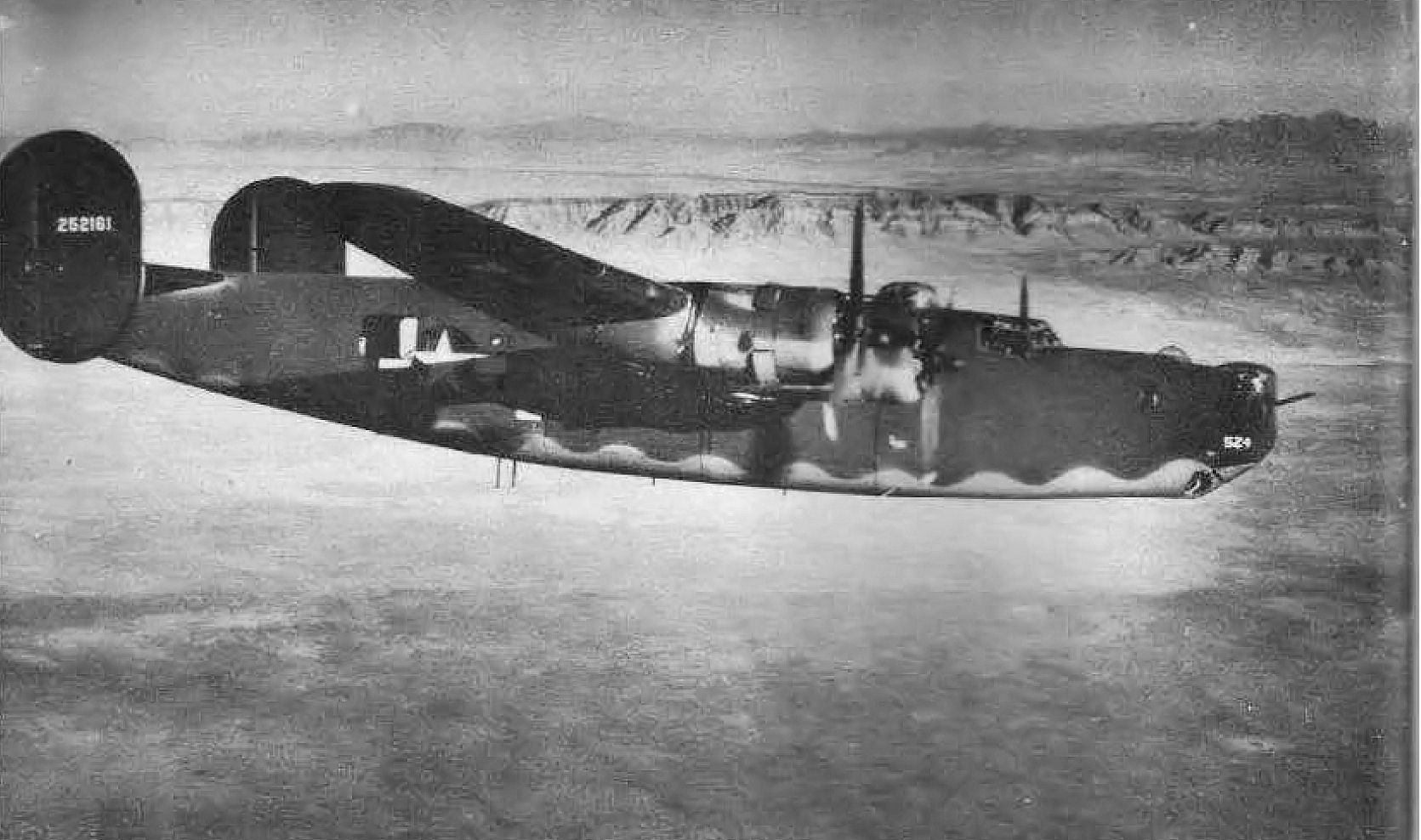
B-24H Liberator 42-52161 from a Second Air Force training unit (Note: Aircraft is Ford Motors built Consolidated B-24H-10-FO Liberator, serial 42-52161. It later deployed to Europe and was shot down on 22 February 1944. Missing Aircrew Report 2832.)

The 464th Bombardment Squadron was first activated in July 1942 at Salt Lake City Army Air Base, Utah as one of the four original squadrons of the 331st Bombardment Group. In September it moved to Casper Army Air Field, where it became a Boeing B-17 Flying Fortress Replacement Training Unit until 1943, when it converted to the Consolidated B-24 Liberator. Replacement training units were oversized units which trained aircrews prior to their deployment to combat theaters.

However, the Army Air Forces found that standard military units, based on relatively inflexible tables of organization, were not proving to be well adapted to the training mission, particularly to replacement training. Accordingly, it adopted a more functional system in which each base was organized into a separate numbered unit, while the groups and squadrons acting as replacement training units were disbanded or inactivated. This resulted in the 464th, along with other units at Casper, being inactivated in the spring of 1944 and being replaced by the 211th AAF Base Unit (Combat Crew Training Station, Heavy), which assumed the 331st Group's mission, personnel, and equipment.

=== Very heavy bomber operations ===
In September 1944, the squadron was reactivated as a Boeing B-29 Superfortress unit at Dalhart Army Air Field, Texas and assigned to the 382d Bombardment Group. In December it moved to Smoky Hill Army Air Field, Kansas, where it began training with B-29s.

Training was considerably delayed due to equipment shortages, and it did not receive B-29 aircraft until late spring 1945. The ground echelon deployed to Guam by ship in early August 1945, while the air echelon remained in the United States. The ground echelon remained in the Marianas supporting other units' aircraft. After the ground echelon returned to the United States in December 1945, the entire unit was inactivated ay Camp Anza, California on 4 January 1946.

== Lineage ==
- Constituted 464th Bombardment Squadron (Heavy) on 1 July 1942

Activated on 6 July 1942
Inactivated on 1 April 1944

- Redesignated 464th Bombardment Squadron, Very Heavy on 4 August 1944

Activated on 19 September 1944
Inactivated on 4 January 1946

=== Assignments ===
- 331st Bombardment Group, 6 July 1942 – 1 April 1944
- 382d Bombardment Group, 19 September 1944 – 4 January 1946

=== Stations ===
- Salt Lake City Army Air Base, Utah, 6 July 1942
- Casper Army Air Field, Wyoming, 15 September 1942 – 1 April 1944
- Dalhart Army Air Field, Texas, 19 September 1944
- Smoky Hill Army Air Field, Kansas, 11 December 1944 – 1 August 1945
- Guam, 8 September 1945 (ground echelon only)
- Tinian, c. October – 15 December 1945 (ground echelon only)
- Camp Anza, California, 28 December 1945 – 4 January 1946

=== Aircraft ===
- Boeing B-17 Flying Fortress, 1942-1943, 1944–1945
- Consolidated B-24 Liberator, 1943-1944, 1944–1945
- North American B-25 Mitchell, 1944–1945
- Boeing B-29 Superfortress, 1945-1946

=== Campaigns ===
Campaign Streamer	Campaign	Dates	Notes
	American Theater without inscription	6 July 1942–1 April 1944, 19 September 1944-1 August 1945	
	Asiatic Pacific Theater without inscription	September 1945	
