= 524 Squadron =

524 Squadron or 524th Squadron may refer to:

- No. 524 Squadron RAF, United Kingdom
- 524th Bomb Squadron, United States
- 524th Fighter Squadron, United States
- 524th Special Operations Squadron, United States
