= 382d Bombardment Group =

Former U.S. Army Air Forces unit

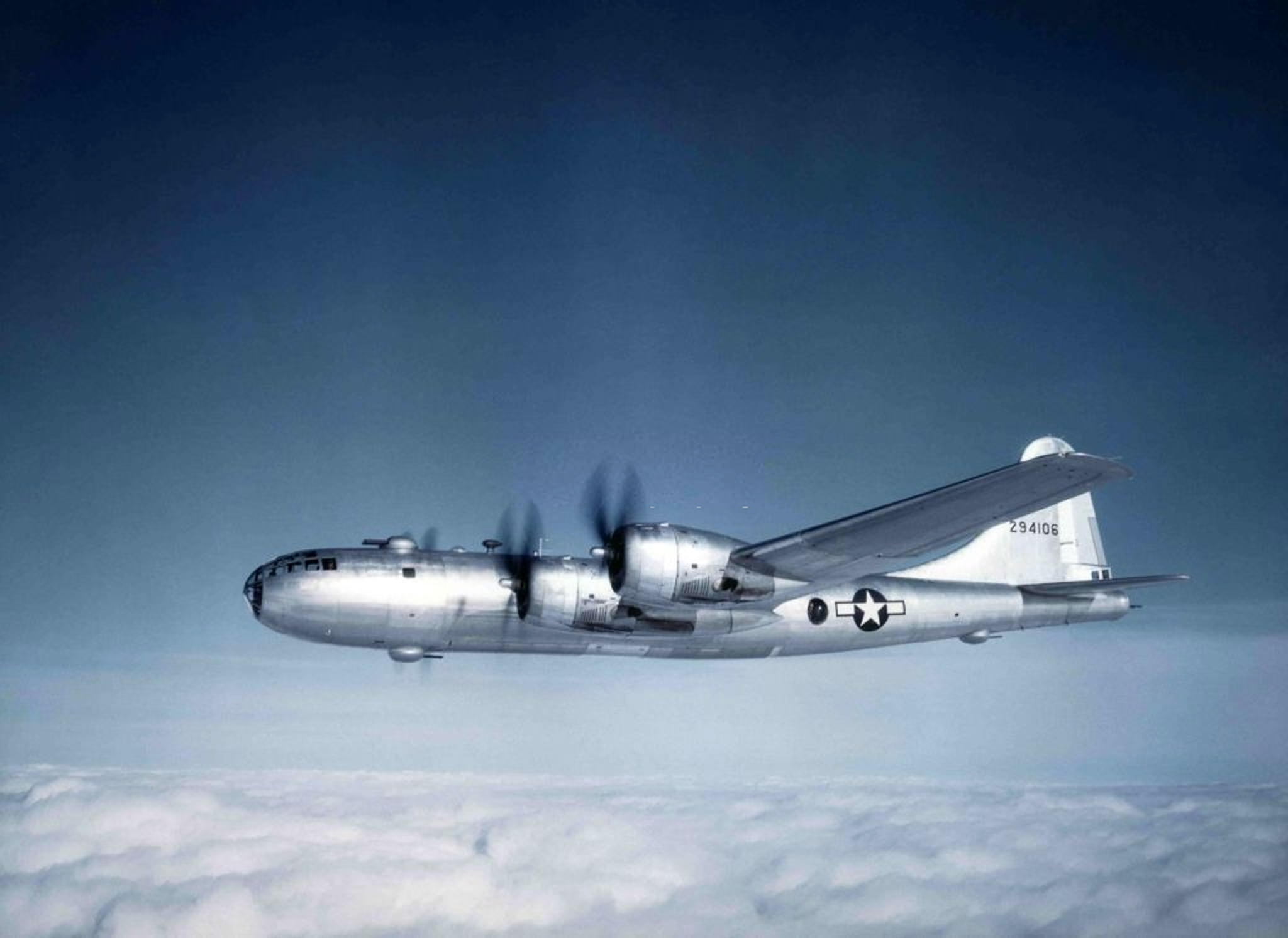
- B-29 Bomber on a long range mission in late 1945 (Note: Aircraft is Boeing B-29A-30-BN Superfortress, serial 42-94106.)
- Active: 1942–1944; 1944–1946
- Country: United States
- Branch: United States Air Force
- Role: Heavy bomber
- Engagements: Pacific Theater

The 382d Bombardment Group is a former United States Army Air Forces unit. It was last stationed at Camp Anza, California, where it was inactivated on 4 January 1946. The group was active from 1942 to 1944 as a heavy bomber training unit. It was reorganized as a very heavy bomber unit and trained for deployment overseas. However, it arrived at its overseas station too late to see combat, and returned to the United States, where it was inactivated.

== History ==
=== Heavy bomber training unit ===
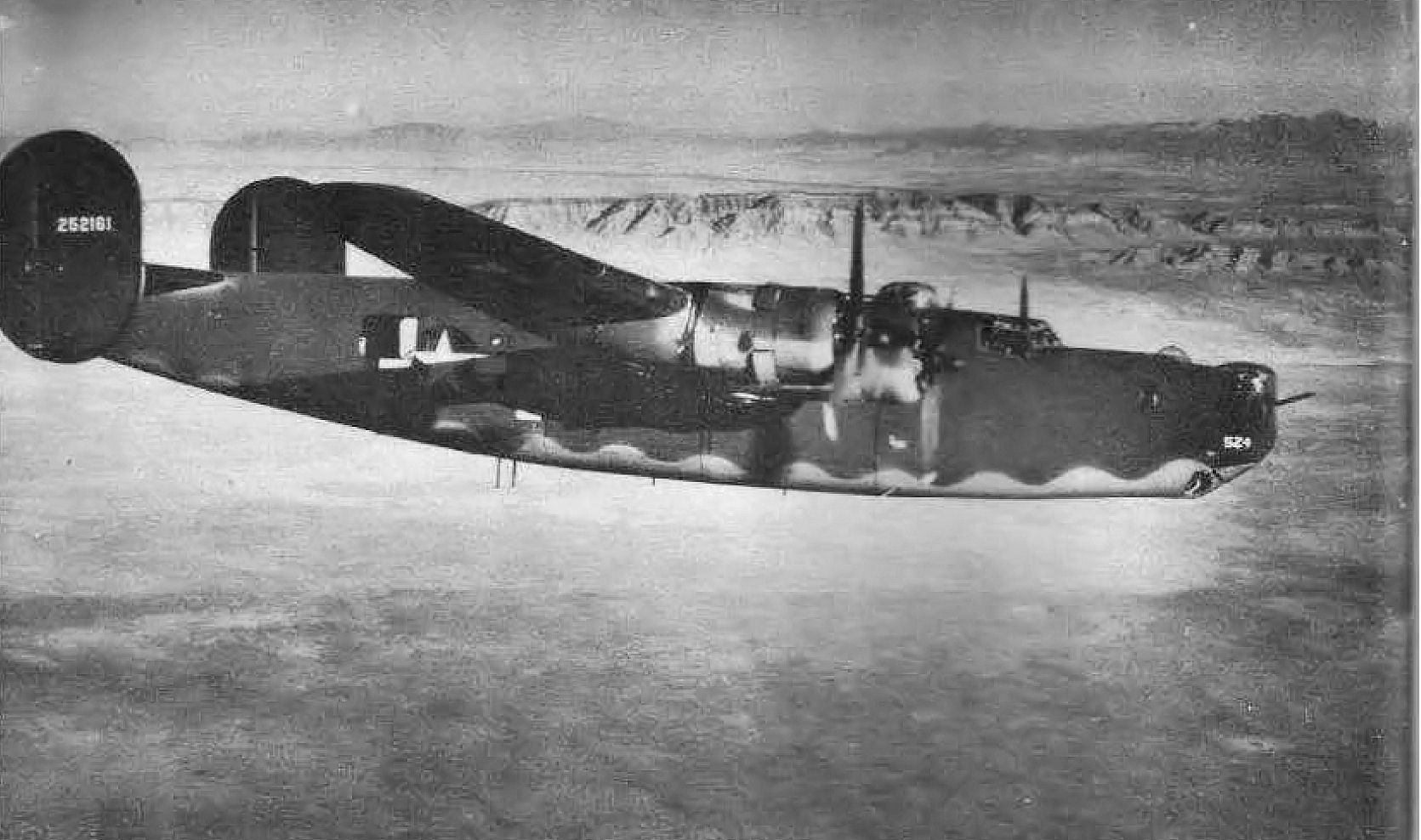
B-24 Liberator of a training unit in the southwest

The group was first activated at Salt Lake City Army Air Base in November 1942, with the 536th, 537th, 538th and 539th Bombardment Squadrons assigned. The group moved to Davis–Monthan Field, Arizona in January 1943 and began to operate as an Operational Training Unit (OTU) for Consolidated B-24 Liberator units. The OTU program involved the use of an oversized parent unit to provide cadres to "satellite groups". In April 1943, the group moved to Pocatello Army Air Field, Idaho, where its mission changed to acting as a Replacement Training Unit (RTU) for Liberator aircrews. RTUs were also oversized units, but their mission was to train individual pilots or aircrews.

However, the Army Air Forces (AAF) was finding that standard military units like the 382d, based on relatively inflexible tables of organization, were not well adapted to the training mission. Accordingly, the AAF adopted a more functional system in which each base was organized into a separate numbered unit, whose manning and equipment was tailored to the base's mission. As a result of this reorganization, the 382d was inactivated, and along with other units at Muroc Army Air Field, California, replaced by the 421st AAF Base Unit (Bombardment Replacement Training Unit-Heavy).

=== B-29 operations ===
The group was again activated in late August 1944 at Dalhart Army Air Field, Texas as a Boeing B-29 Superfortress, unit, although until 19 September it had no squadrons assigned and was commanded by a second lieutenant. On that date, a new set of squadrons, the 420th, 464th, and 872d Bombardment Squadrons, were assigned to the group as its combat elements. These squadrons had each been active as training units earlier, but had been assigned to other groups.

The group trained with Superfortresses until the summer of 1945. Its ground echelon deployed to Guam and Tinian by ship in early August 1945 while the air echelon remained at Smoky Hill Army Air Field, Kansas after V-J Day. The ground echelon remained in the Marianas supporting other units' aircraft. The air echelon inactivated in Kansas in August 1945. The ground echelon returned to the United States in December 1945 and was inactivated after transit through the Los Angeles Port of Embarkation in January 1946.

== Lineage ==
- Constituted as 382d Bombardment Group (Heavy) on 28 October 1942

Activated on 3 November 1942
Inactivated on 31 March 1944

- Redesignated 382d Bombardment Group, Very Heavy and activated on 25 August 1944.

Inactivated on 4 January 1946

=== Assignments ===
- II Bomber Command, 3 November 1942 – 31 March 1944
- II Bomber Command, 25 August 1944 (attached to 17th Bombardment Operational Training Wing)
- 316th Bombardment Wing, 31 August 1945 – 4 January 1946

=== Components ===
- 420th Bombardment Squadron, 19 September 1944 – 4 January 1946
- 464th Bombardment Squadron, 19 September 1944 – 4 January 1946
- 536th Bombardment Squadron, 3 November 1942 – 31 March 1944
- 537th Bombardment Squadron, 3 November 1942 – 31 March 1944 (not operational after 6 December 1943)
- 538th Bombardment Squadron, 3 November 1942 – 31 March 1944
- 539th Bombardment Squadron, 3 November 1942 – 31 March 1944
- 872d Bombardment Squadron, 19 September 1944 – 4 January 1946
- 33d Photographic Laboratory, 19 September 1944 – 4 January 1946

=== Stations ===
- Salt Lake City Army Air Base, Utah, 3 November 1942
- Davis–Monthan Field, Arizona, 23 January 1943
- Pocatello Army Air Field, Idaho, 5 April 1943
- Muroc Army Air Field, California, 6 December 1943 – 31 March 1944
- Dalhart Army Air Field, Texas, 25 August 1944
- Smoky Hill Army Air Field, Kansas, 11 December 1944 – 8 July 1945
- North Field, Guam 8 September-16 December 1945
- Camp Anza, California, 30 December 1945 – 4 January 1946

=== Aircraft ===
- Consolidated B-24 Liberator, 1942–1944
- Boeing B-29 Superfortress, 1944-1945

=== Campaigns ===
Campaign Streamer	Campaign	Dates	Notes
	American Theater without inscription	3 November 1942 – 31 March 1944, 25 August 1944 – 8 July 1945	
	Asiatic–Pacific Theater without inscription	8 September 1945 – 30 December 1945	

== See also ==
- B-24 Liberator units of the United States Army Air Forces
- List of B-29 Superfortress operators
