= 524th Bomb Squadron =

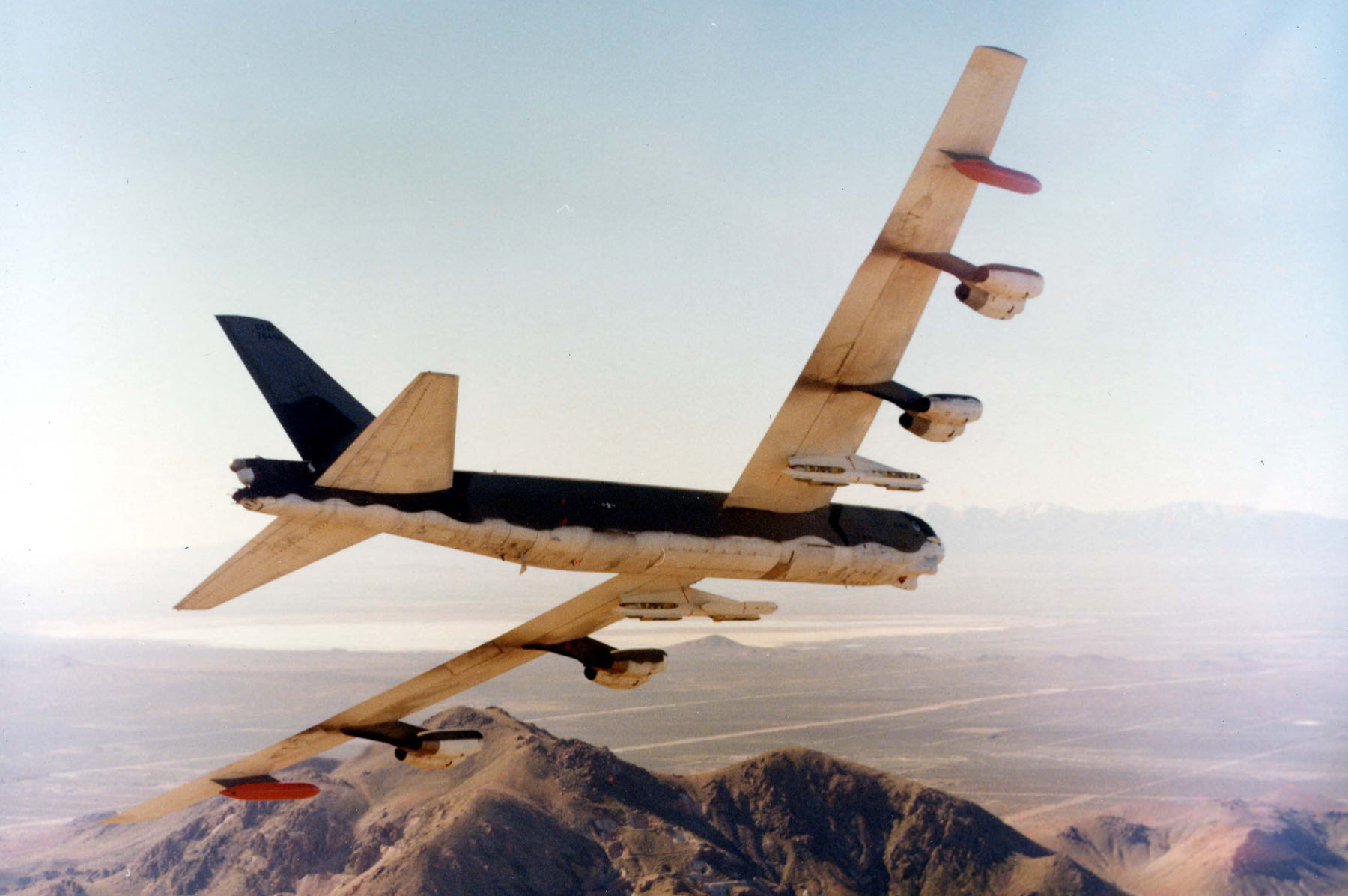
- B-52 Stratofortress as flown by the squadron
- Active: 1940–1945; 1955–1992
- Country: United States
- Branch: United States Air Force
- Role: Heavy bomber
- Motto: Vigilance for Peace (1962-1992)
- Engagements: European Theater of Operations
- Decorations: Distinguished Unit Citation

Insignia
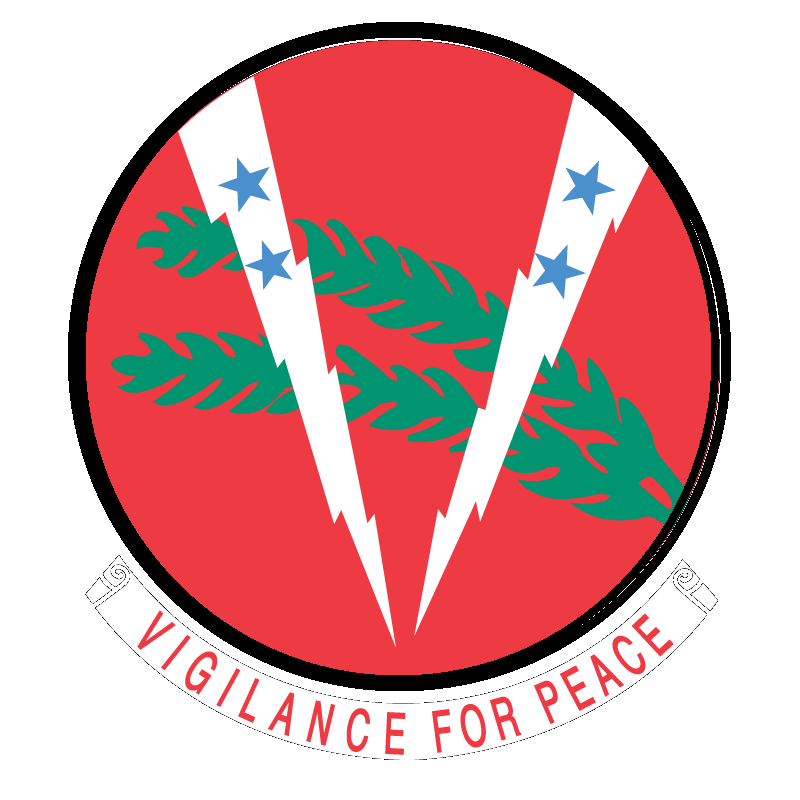
- 524th Bomb Squadron emblem (Note: Approved 3 August 1962. Description: On a red disc bordered black, two green olive branches, arched bendwise throughout surmounted by two white lightning flashes, throughout, issuing from dexter and sinister chief respectively and converging in center base, each charged with two Air Force blue stars in chief, one above the other)

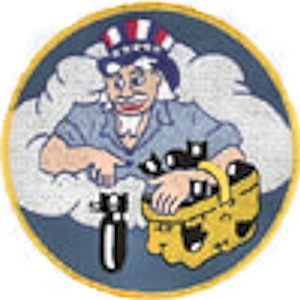
- 524th Bombardment Squadron emblem (World War II)
- World War II fuselage code: WA

The 524th Bomb Squadron is an inactive United States Air Force unit. It was last assigned to the 379th Bombardment Wing at Wurtsmith Air Force Base, Michigan, and was inactivated on 15 December 1992 as the base was drawing down prior to closure.

The squadron was first activated during World War II as the 524th Bombardment Squadron. After training in the United States, it moved to England, where it participated in the strategic bombing campaign against Germany. The squadron twice was awarded the Distinguished Unit Citation for its combat actions. Following V-E Day, the squadron moved to Morocco, where it participated in the transportation of military personnel back to the United States until it was inactivated in June 1945.

The squadron was reactivated in 1955 as a Boeing B-47 Stratojet strategic bomber squadron. In 1960, it began converting to the Boeing B-52 Stratofortress. However, Strategic Air Command was engaged in a project to disperse its B-52 wings to reduce their vulnerability to Soviet attack and the squadron moved to Wurtsmith in 1961. The squadron stood nuclear alert at Wurtsmith until the end of the Cold War. It deployed planes and aircrew to support Operation Desert Storm before inactivating.

== History ==
=== World War II ===
==== Activation and training ====
The squadron was first activated at Geiger Field, Washington in November 1942 as one of the four original squadrons of the 379th Bombardment Group. After initial organization, a cadre moved to Wendover Field, Utah to begin training as a heavy bomber unit with the Boeing B-17 Flying Fortress. Training was completed by early April 1943, and the ground echelon moved to Camp Williams, Wisconsin on 9 April, then proceeded to the port of embarkation at Camp Shanks, New York, where it boarded the RMS Aquitania for shipment to England in early May. The air echelon moved to Dow Field, Maine to ferry their Flying Fortresses via the North Atlantic Ferry Route, starting on 15 April.

==== Combat in the European Theater ====
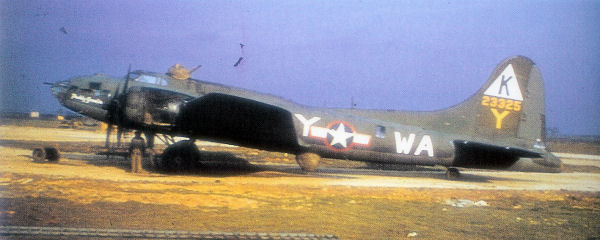
Squadron B-17 at RAF Kimbolton (Note: Aircraft is Douglas built Boeing B-17F-45-DL Flying Fortress, serial 42-3325, Paddy Gremlin, WA-Y. On 30 January 1944, it was struck by bombs dropped by a plane higher in the formation and crashed near the Belgian border, with all aircrew becoming prisoners of war. Eight crewmembers were wounded when an enemy aircraft strafed the wrecked plane. Baugher, Joe (3 April 2023). "1942 USAF Serial Numbers". Joe Baugher.)

The air echelon of the squadron arrived at RAF Bovingdon by 24 April 1943, and remained there until 21 May, when it joined the ground echelon at RAF Kimbolton, which was to be its combat station for the remainder of its time in the European Theater of Operations. The squadron flew its first combat mission on 29 May, and focused on the strategic bombing campaign against Germany. This mission was the starting point for the first Distinguished Unit Citation (DUC) awarded to the squadron for its sustained actions through the end of July 1944. Targets included industrial sites, oil refineries, storage plants, submarine pens, airfields and communications centers in Germany, France, the Netherlands, Belgium, Norway and Poland. Targets also included a chemical plant in Ludwigshafen, an aircraft assembly plant in Braunschweig, ball bearing plants at Schweinfurt and Leipzig, synthetic oil refineries at Merseburg and Gelsenkirchen, marshalling yards at Hamm and Reims and airfields in le Mesnil-au-Val and Berlin. The squadron received a second DUC for its attack on the Focke-Wulf Fw 190 aircraft factory at Oschersleben and the Junkers factory at Halberstadt on 11 January 1944. The programmed fighter escort encountered prohibitive weather, as did two of the three divisions making the attack. However, weather in the east was sufficiently clear that the Luftwaffe was able to assemble the largest interceptor force to oppose the attack for the preceding three months. However, the squadron flew into enemy territory without fighter escort to complete its mission.

The squadron was occasionally diverted from the strategic bombing campaign to perform close air support and interdiction missions. It supported Operation Crossbow by attacking V-1 flying bomb and V-2 rocket launch sites. It bombed airfields, radar stations and other installations to prepare for Operation Overlord, the Normandy invasion in June 1944. On D-Day, it bombed defended positions just ahead of the Allied landings and struck airfields, rail choke points, and gun emplacements during the campaign that followed.

During the Northern France Campaign, the squadron bombed enemy positions to assist ground troops during Operation Cobra, the breakout at Saint Lo on 24 and 25 July 1944. It attacked German communications and fortifications during the Battle of the Bulge, from December 1944 through January 1945 and bombed bridges and viaducts in France and Germany to aid the Allied assault across the Rhine, from February to March 1945. The squadron flew its last mission on 25 April 1945.

After V-E Day the squadron was detailed for the Green Project, which called for moving 50,000 American troops back to the United States each month. The squadron moved to Casablanca Airfield, French Morocco, but in June, Air Transport Command decided to use its own, more flexible organization (Note: Air Transport Command had reorganized its overseas units under the AAF Base Unit System in 1944. See Goss, p. 75 for the reasons for this reorganization.) for the project and the squadron was inactivated on 25 July 1945.

=== Strategic Air Command ===
==== B-47 era ====
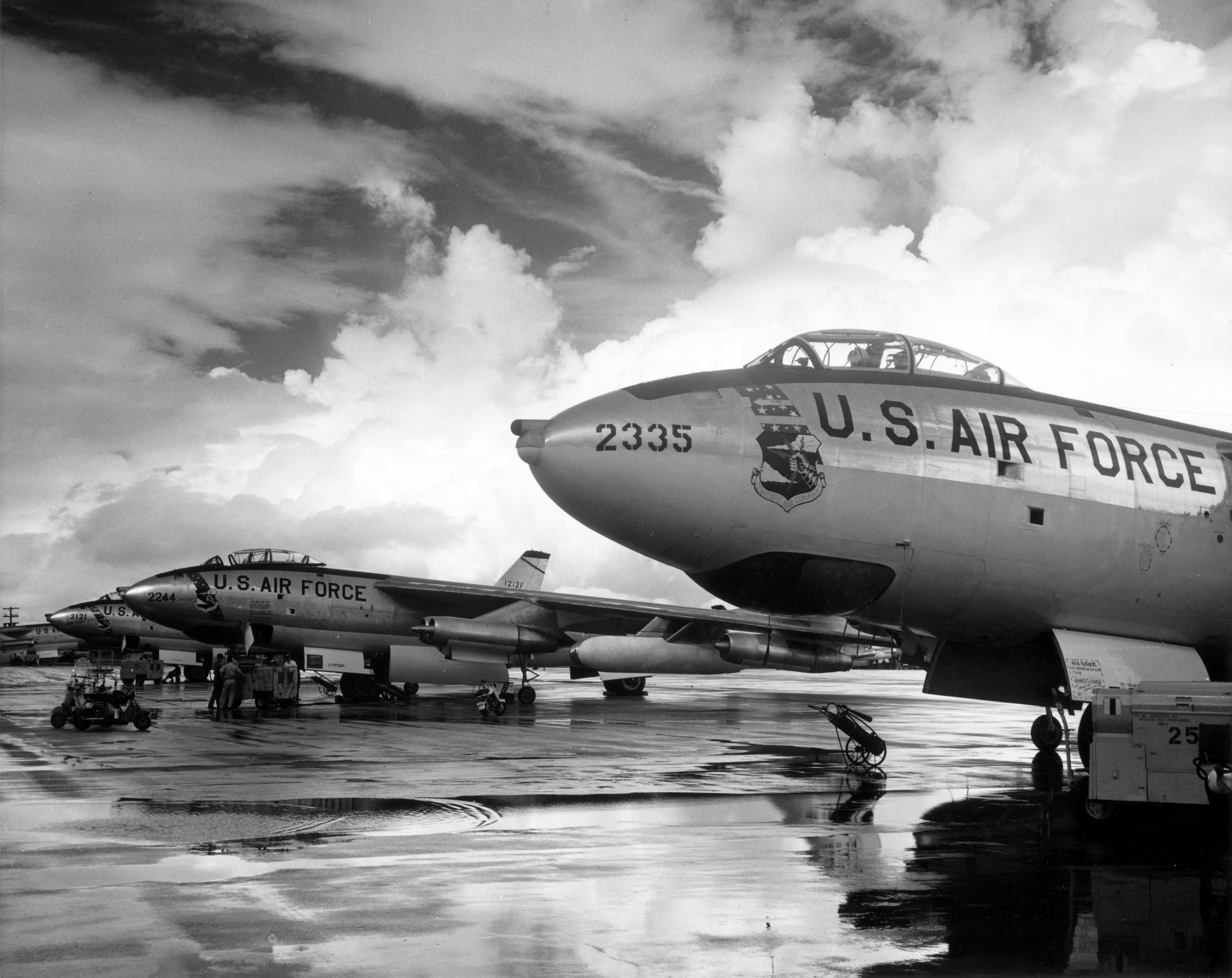
Strategic Air Command B-47 Stratojets

The squadron was reactivated at Homestead Air Force Base, Florida in November 1955 and assigned to the 379th Bombardment Wing. The unit's first few months were spent in organizing and manning as a Strategic Air Command (SAC) bomber unit. It received its Boeing B-47 Stratojet bombers in April 1956 and began training for strategic bombing operations. Once the wing became combat ready, it began overseas Operation Reflex alert operations training, sending five Stratojets to Sidi Slimane Air Base, Morocco. Reflex placed Stratojets and Boeing KC-97s at bases closer to the Soviet Union for 90 day periods, although individuals rotated back to home bases during unit Reflex deployments

From 1958, SAC's B-47 wings began to assume an alert posture at their home bases, reducing the amount of time spent on alert at overseas bases. General Thomas S. Power’s initial goal was to maintain one third of SAC's planes on fifteen minute ground alert, fully fueled and ready for combat to reduce vulnerability to a Soviet missile strike. This program was short lived for the squadron. In October 1960, it began to transfer its B-47s to other units, becoming non-operational.

==== B-52 era ====
The squadron moved on paper to Wurtsmith Air Force Base, Michigan in January 1961 as the 379th Bombardment Wing replaced the 4026th Strategic Wing there. The 4026th wing had been established by SAC in a program to disperse its B-52 heavy bombers over a larger number of bases, thus making it more difficult for the Soviet Union to knock out the entire fleet with a surprise first strike. SAC bases with large concentrations of bombers made attractive targets. SAC’s response was to break up its wings and scatter their aircraft over a larger number of bases. The squadron's first B-52H Stratofortress (Note: Boeing B-52H-135-BW, serial 60-1, State of Michigan. Baugher, Joe (14 April 2023). "1960 USAF Serial Numbers". Joe Baugher.) arrived on 1 May. Once the squadron was combat ready it began to train for strategic bombing and placed aircraft on ground alert. SAC increased its alert commitment to half the squadron's aircraft in 1962.

During the 1962 Cuban Missile Crisis, on 22 October, 1/8 of SAC's B-52s were placed on airborne alert. On 24 October SAC went to DEFCON 2, placing all aircraft on alert. As tensions eased, on 21 November SAC returned to normal airborne alert posture. went to DEFCON 3 on 24 November, and on 27 November returned to normal alert posture. In 1964, the wing added the AGM-69 Short Range Attack Missile capability to its bombing mission. Although the squadron did not deploy aircraft to support the Vietnam War, starting In 1965 its crewmembers began to crosstrain in the B-52D and deployed to fly Operation Arc Light missions.

The squadron continued to operate the B-52H until 1977. In May 1977, the first B-52G arrived from Ellsworth Air Force Base, and the squadron completed transition to that model in July. That year, the squadron also won the Doolittle Trophy for low level bombing during Giant Sword, SAC's annual bombing and navigation competition. The following year's competition saw the squadron rated as the best B-52 unit. In 1980, the squadron won the Gerald Johnson Trophy for the best bomber performance at the William Tell weapons competition and in 1987, the 524th won four of the major trophies awarded in the annual bombing and navigation competition for excellence in high and low-level bombing; the Curtis E. LeMay Bombing Trophy, the Mathis Trophy, the John D. Ryan B-52 Trophy, and the William J. Crumm Linebacker Memorial Trophy.

On 18 January 1991, bombers from the squadron departed to strike targets in Desert Storm, after recovering at Prince Abdullah Air Base, Saudi Arabia, the bombers and crews were attached to the 1708th Bombardment Wing (Provisional) and continued to fly combat missions. One plane flew 29 missions out of Jeddah, the most of any bomber crew in the theater. During the Gulf War, 524th squadron aircraft carried the "Triangle K" tail flash in honor of their World War II predecessors and heritage. Later that year, on 27 September 1991, the wing ended thirty years of nuclear alert, when President Bush removed USAF bombers and land based missiles from their alert commitment with the end of the Cold War. Shortly thereafter the squadron began drawing down as substantial reductions were made to the B-52 force. It was inactivated on 15 December 1992.

== Lineage ==
- Constituted as the 524th Bombardment Squadron (Heavy) On 28 October 1942

Activated on 3 November 1942
Redesignated 524th Bombardment Squadron, Heavy c. 20 August 1943
Inactivated on 25 July 1945
Redesignated 524th Bombardment Squadron, Medium on 12 July 1955
Activated on 1 November 1955
Redesignated 524th Bombardment Squadron, Heavy on 9 January 1961
Redesignated 524th Bomb Squadron on 1 September 1991
Inactivated on 15 December 1992

=== Assignments ===
- 379th Bombardment Group, 3 November 1942 – 25 July 1945
- 379th Bombardment Wing, 1 November 1955
- 379th Operations Group, 1 September 1991 – 15 December 1992

=== Stations ===
- Geiger Field, Washington, 3 November 1942
- Wendover Field, Utah, 19 November 1942
- Sioux City Army Air Base, Iowa, 3 February–April 1943
- RAF Kimbolton (AAF-117), England, 21 May 1943 – 12 June 1945
- Casablanca Airfield, French Morocco, 17 June–25 July 1945
- Homestead Air Force Base, Florida, 1 November 1955
- Wurtsmith Air Force Base, Michigan, 9 January 1961 – 15 December 1992

=== Aircraft ===
- Boeing B-17 Flying Fortress, 1942–1945
- Boeing B-47 Stratojet, 1956–1960
- Boeing B-52H Stratofortress, 1961-1977
- Boeing B-52G Stratofortress, 1977-1992

=== Awards and campaigns ===
Award streamer	Award	Dates	Notes
	Distinguished Unit Citation	29 May 1943-31 July 1944	Continental Europe, 524th Bombardment Squadron
	Distinguished Unit Citation	11 January 1944	Germany, 524th Bombardment Squadron
	Air Force Outstanding Unit Award	1 July 1963-30 Jun 1964	524th Bombardment Squadron
	Air Force Outstanding Unit Award	1 July 1970-30 Jun 1971	524th Bombardment Squadron
	Air Force Outstanding Unit Award	1 July 1972-30 Jun 1973	524th Bombardment Squadron
	Air Force Outstanding Unit Award	1 July 1974-30 Jun 1975	524th Bombardment Squadron
	Air Force Outstanding Unit Award	1 July 1978-30 Jun 1979	524th Bombardment Squadron
	Air Force Outstanding Unit Award	1 July 1983-30 Jun 1985	524th Bombardment Squadron
	Air Force Outstanding Unit Award	1 July 1987-30 Jun 1989	524th Bombardment Squadron
	Air Force Outstanding Unit Award	1 July 1989-30 Jun 1991	524th Bombardment Squadron

Campaign Streamer	Campaign	Dates	Notes
	Air Offensive, Europe	21 May 1943 – 5 June 1944	524th Bombardment Squadron
	Air Combat, EAME Theater	21 May 1943 – 11 May 1945	524th Bombardment Squadron
	Normandy	6 June 1944 – 24 July 1944	524th Bombardment Squadron
	Northern France	25 July 1944 – 14 September 1944	524th Bombardment Squadron
	Rhineland	15 September 1944 – 21 March 1945	524th Bombardment Squadron
	Ardennes-Alsace	16 December 1944 – 25 January 1945	524th Bombardment Squadron
	Central Europe	22 March 1945 – 21 May 1945	524th Bombardment Squadron

== See also ==
- List of B-52 Units of the United States Air Force
- List of B-47 units of the United States Air Force
- B-17 Flying Fortress units of the United States Army Air Forces
