= 379th Air Expeditionary Wing =

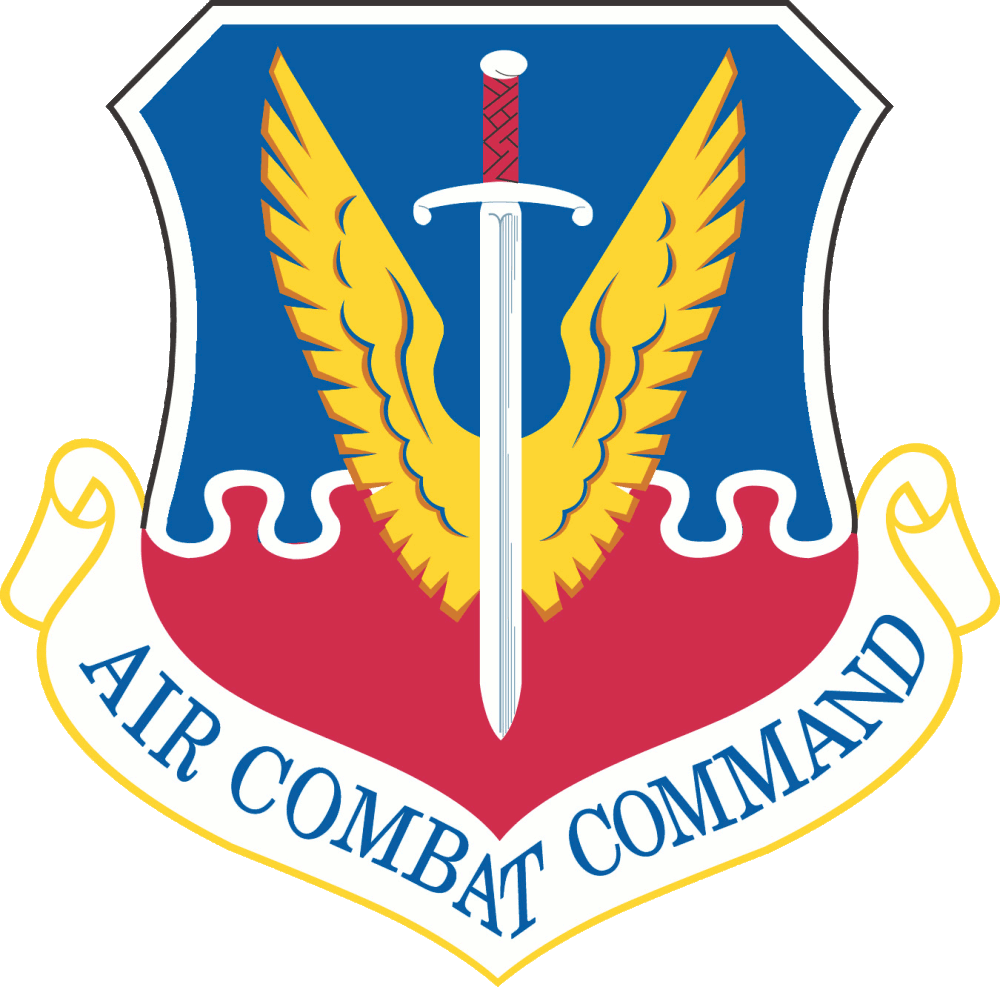
379th Air Expeditionary Wing

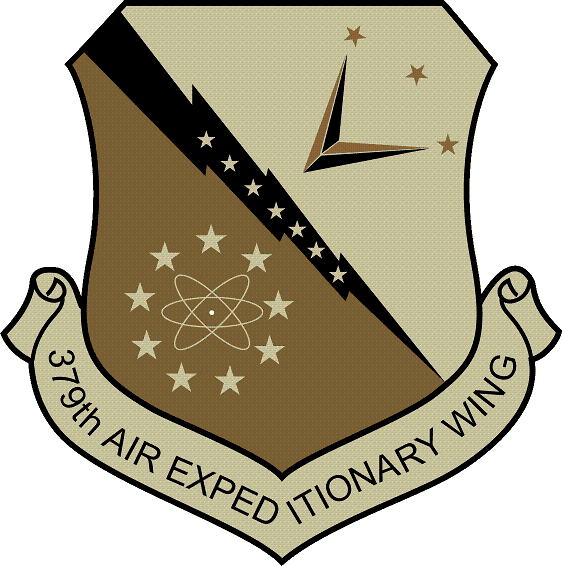
- 379th Air Expeditionary Wing emblem
- Active: 1943–1945; 1955–1993; 2002–present
- Country: United States
- Branch: United States Air Force
- Type: Air Expeditionary
- Role: Various
- Part of: Air Combat Command
- Garrison/HQ: Al Udeid Air Base, Qatar
- Mottos: Diligentia et accuratio (Latin for 'Precision and Accuracy')
- Engagements: European Theater of Operations Operation Desert Storm; Operation Enduring Freedom; Operation Iraqi Freedom

Commanders
- Notable commanders: Eugene E. Habiger

The 379th Air Expeditionary Wing is a provisional United States Air Force unit assigned to Air Combat Command. As a provisional unit, it may be activated or inactivated at any time.

The wing is one of the largest, most diverse expeditionary wings in the Air Force, providing combat airpower and support for Operation Iraqi Freedom, Operation Enduring Freedom, Operation New Dawn, Operation Odyssey Dawn and through the support of Combined Joint Task Force - Horn of Africa. The wing and its associate units operate more than 100 aircraft, making the base a large hub for humanitarian airlift activity while providing mission-essential combat power, aeromedical evacuation and intelligence support for three theaters of operations.

During World War II, the Wing's predecessor unit, the 379th Bombardment Group was a VIII Bomber Command B-17 Flying Fortress unit in England. Assigned to RAF Kimbolton in early 1943, the group flew more sorties than any other bomb group in the Eighth Air Force, and dropped a greater bomb tonnage than any other group. The combat record of the 379th was the most successful of all the Eighth Air Force heavy bomber groups, receiving two Distinguished Unit Citations. Active for over 50 years, the 379th Bombardment Wing was a component organization of Strategic Air Command's deterrent force during the Cold War, as a strategic bombardment wing.

== Units ==
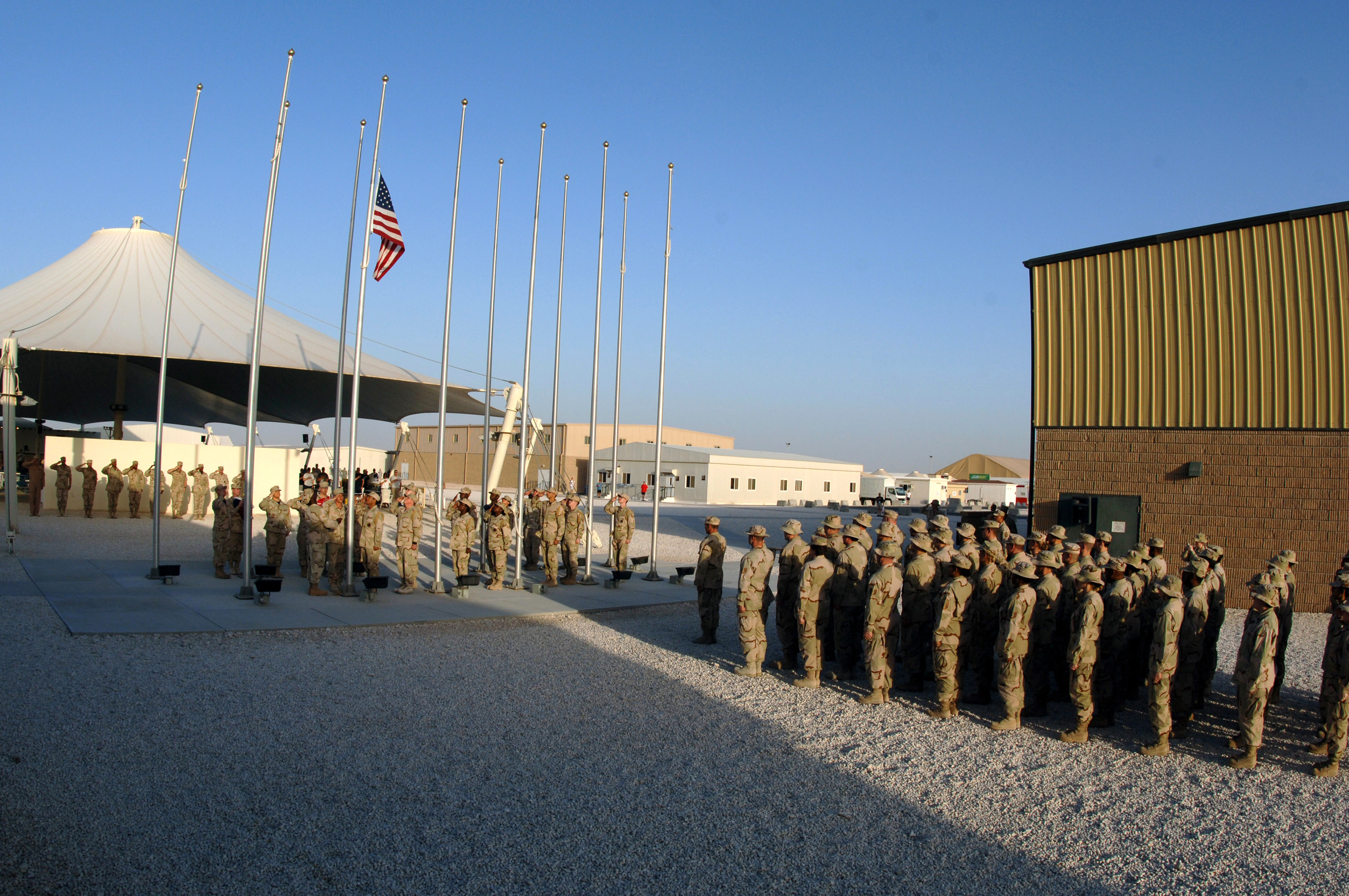
Airmen from the honor guard and the 379th Expeditionary Medical Group perform a retreat ceremony in 2006

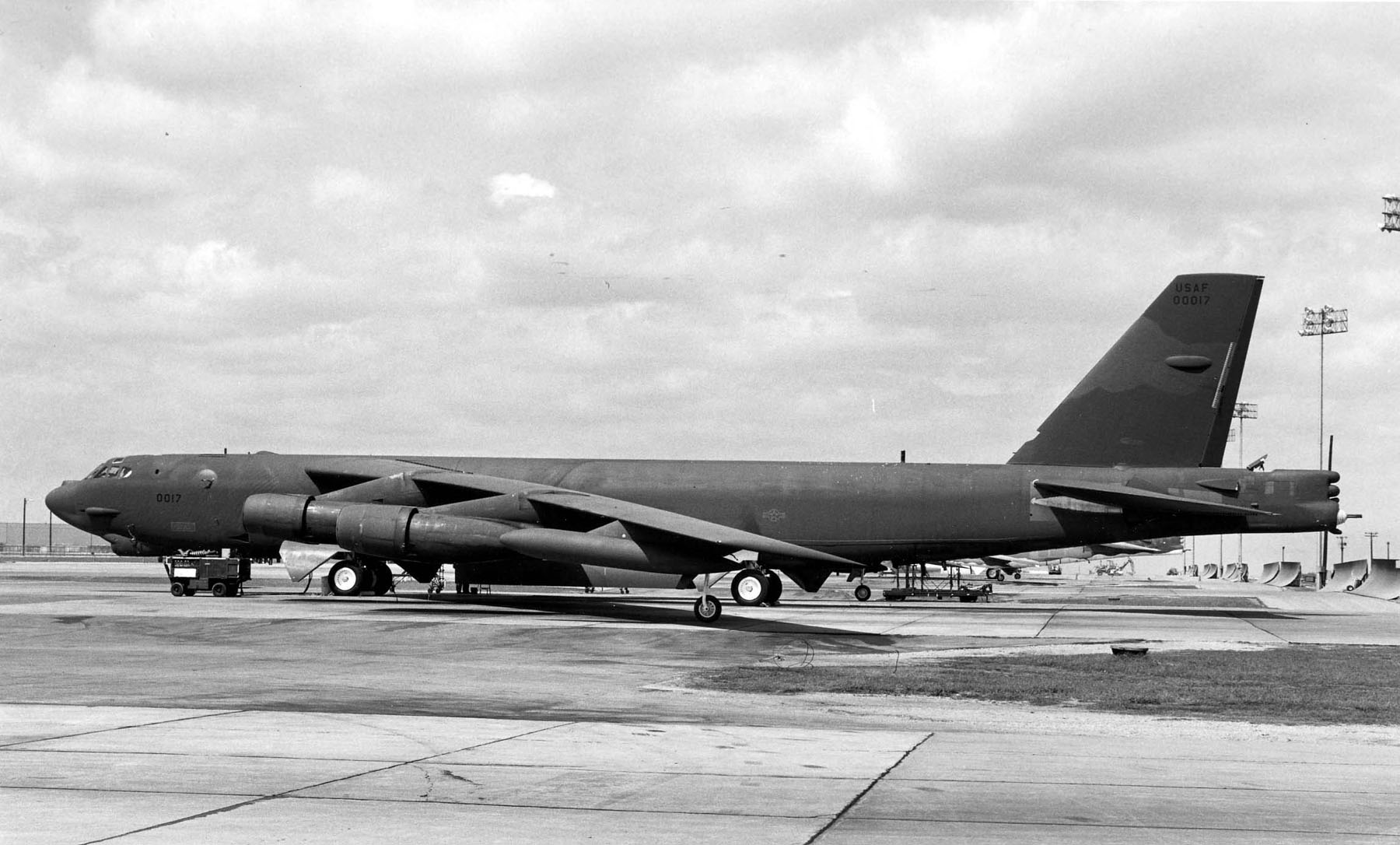
A Boeing B-52H (SN 60-0017), the type assigned to the 379th Bomb Wing at Wurtsmith AFB during the 1960s and 1970s

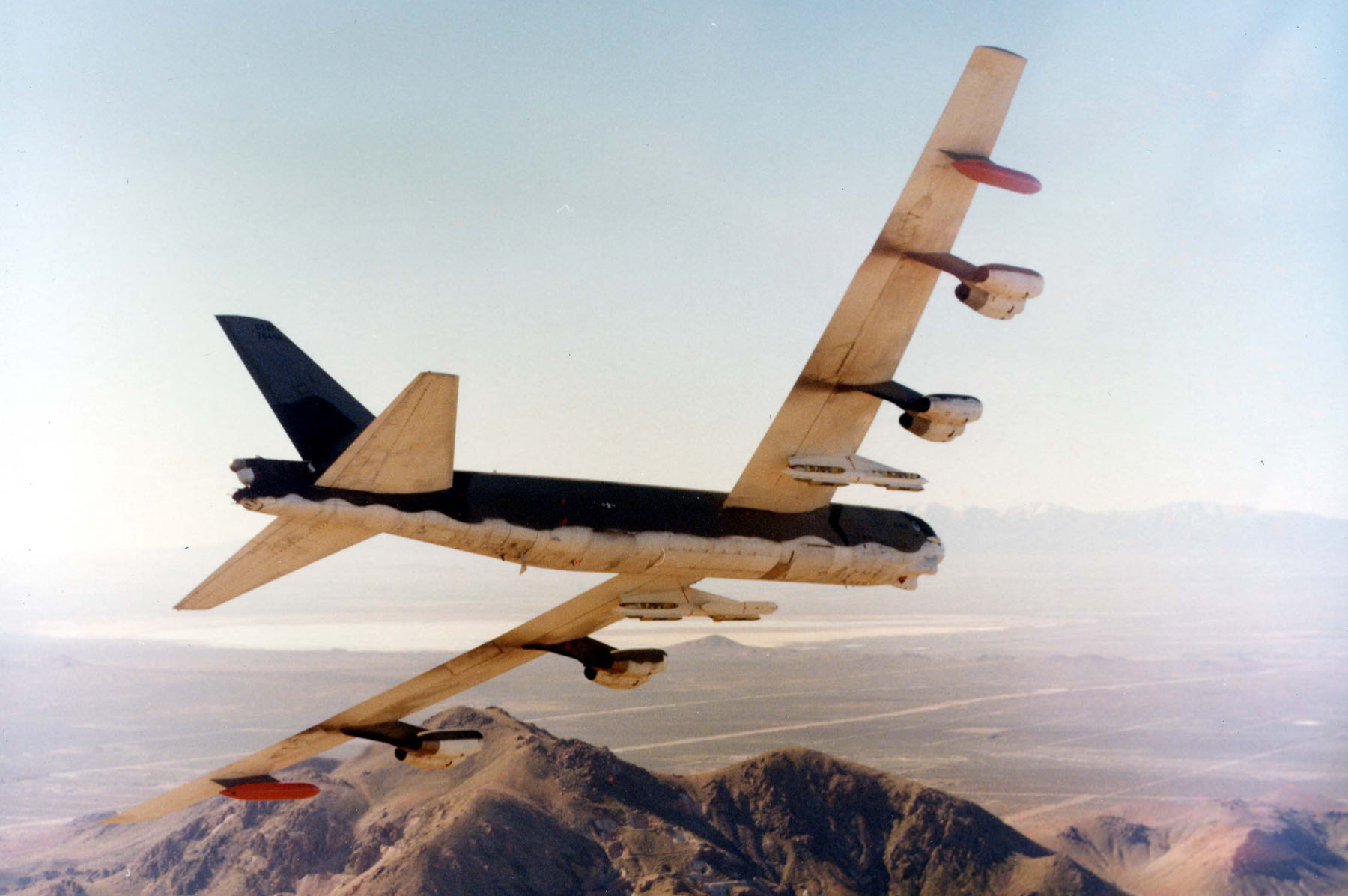
A B-52G in flight. Note the external wing pylons and larger bomb bays to accommodate conventional bombs

  - 7th Expeditionary Airborne Command and Control Squadron (E-8)
  - 340th Expeditionary Air Refueling Squadron (KC-135)
  - 746th Expeditionary Airlift Squadron (C-130H/J, C-21)
  - 763d Expeditionary Reconnaissance Squadron (RC-135)
  - 816th Expeditionary Airlift Squadron (C-17)
- 379th Expeditionary Air Base Group – 2 April 2024
  - 379th Expeditionary Aeromedical Evacuation Squadron
  - 379th Expeditionary Operations Support Squadron
  - 379th Expeditionary Maintenance Squadron
  - 379th Expeditionary Civil Engineer Squadron
  - 379th Expeditionary Security Forces Squadron
  - 379th Expeditionary Communications Squadron (AF level 2005 Lt. Gen. Harold W. Grant Award winner)
  - 379th Expeditionary Contracting Squadron
  - 379th Expeditionary Logistics Readiness Squadron
  - 379th Expeditionary Medical Squadron

== History ==
=== World War II ===
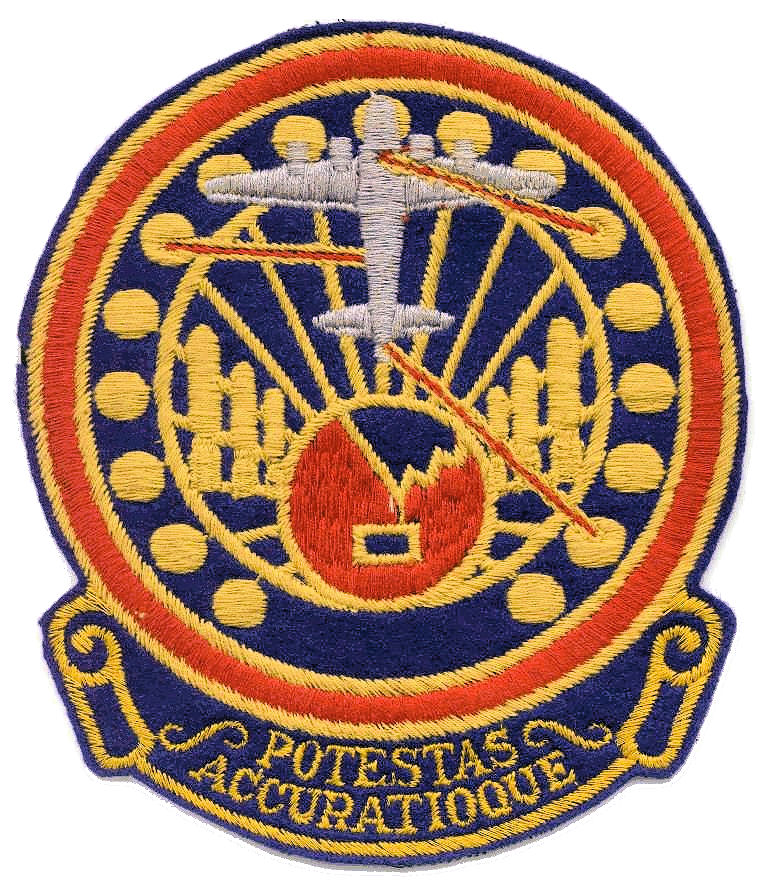
Emblem of the 379th Bombardment Group

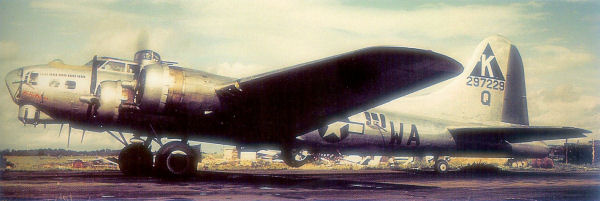
Boeing B-17G-45-BO Fortress 42-97229 524th BS, "Hi Ho Silver".

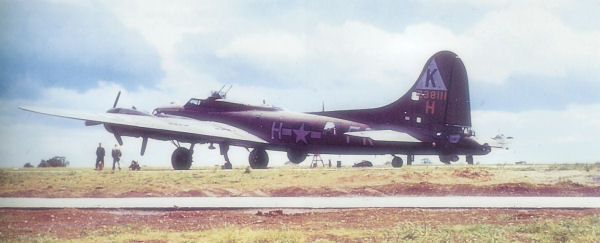
Douglas-Long Beach B-17G-30-DL Fortress 42-38111 525th BS.

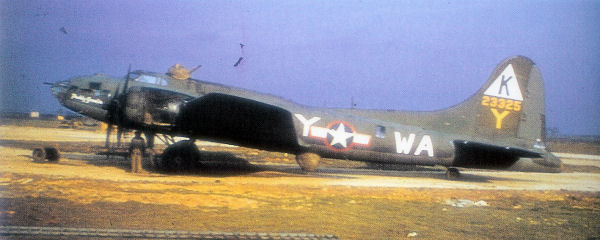
Douglas-Long Beach B-17F-45-DL Fortress 42-3325 524th BS, "Paddy Gremlin".

The group was activated on 26 November 1942 at Gowen Field, Idaho. It assembled at Wendover Field, Utah on 2 December 1942. They trained there until 2 March 1943. Then moved to Sioux City AAB Iowa on 3 February 1943 until their departure on 9 April 1943. The ground echelon moved for final processing at Camp Douglas, Wis, and then to Camp Shanks, New York. They sailed on the SS Aquitania on 10 May 1943, and arrived at Clyde on 18 May 1943. The aircraft left Sioux City on 9 April 1943 for Bangor, Maine, via Kearney, Nebraska, and Selfridge, Michigan. They commenced overseas movement on 15 April 1943 by the North Atlantic ferry route from Presque Isle, Maine via Greenland, Iceland to Prestwick, Scotland.

Arrived in England in May 1943, assigned to VIII Bomber Command, 41st Combat Bombardment Wing. Stationed at RAF Kimbolton, assigned Triangle-K as its tail identification code.

The 379th began operations with Eighth Air Force on 19 May 1943, and received a Distinguished Unit Citation for operations over Europe from May 1943 through July 1944. The group engaged primarily in bombardment of strategic targets such as industries, oil refineries, storage plants, submarine pens, airfields and communications centres in Germany, France, the Netherlands, Belgium, Norway and Poland.

Specific targets included a chemical plant in Ludwigshafen, an aircraft assembly plant in Brunswick, ball-bearing plants at Schweinfurt and Leipzig, synthetic oil refineries at Merseburg and Gelsenkirchen, marshalling yards at Hamm and Reims and airfields in Mesnil au Val and Berlin.

The Group received another DUC for flying without fighter protection into central Germany to attack vital aircraft factories on 11 January 1944. On several occasions the Group attacked interdictory targets and operated in support of ground forces. It bombed V-weapon sites, airfields, radar stations and other installations before the Normandy invasion in June 1944, bombed defended positions just ahead of the Allied landings on 6 June and struck airfields, rail choke points, and gun emplacements during the campaign that followed.

During the Battle of France, the Group bombed enemy positions to assist ground troops at St Lo during the breakthrough, 24–25 July 1944, attacked German communications and fortifications during the Battle of the Bulge, December 1944 – January 1945, and bombed bridges and viaducts in France and Germany to aid the Allied assault across the Rhine, February–March 1945.

The combat record of the 379th was the most successful of all the Eighth Air Force heavy bomber groups. It held records as far as bomb tonnage dropped – 26,459 tons – more than any other unit including those operational before the 379th arrived in the UK. It also exceeded all other UK Bomb Groups in the total number of missions flown, carrying out 330 between May 1943 and 15 May 1945. One B-17G, Ol Gappy, completed 157 missions, probably more than any other Eighth Air Force bomber.

Scheduled to transport US troops from Europe to Casablanca. The unit moved to Casablanca in early June with the last aircraft flown back to the States and the Group inactivated as Casablanca on 25 July 1945.

=== B-47 era ===
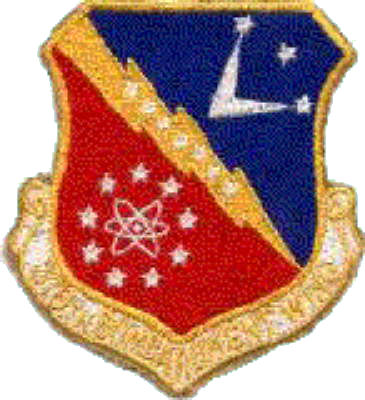
Emblem of the 379th Bombardment Wing

The wing was first activated as the 379th Bombardment Wing, Medium on 1 November 1955 at Homestead Air Force Base in Florida (replacing the 4276th Air Base Squadron). From 1 November 1955 to 31 May 1956 the unit was assigned to the 813th Air Division at Pinecastle Air Force Base, Florida. Its operational squadrons were the 524th, 525th 526th and 527th Bomb Squadrons. Upon activation, the unit was bestowed the honors, history and colors of the World War II 379th Bombardment Group.

In April 1956, the wing began training for air refueling and strategic bombardment operations with the B-47E and KC-97G. It was assigned to the 823d Air Division at Homestead from 1 June 1956 to 9 January 1961. During this time, the wing deployed to Sidi Slimane Air Base, French Morocco, from 6 March to 12 May 1957 coming under the control of SAC's 5th Air Division. Beginning in October 1960, the wing began transferring its B-47s to other SAC wings and became non-operational.

=== B-52 era ===
The 379th moved to Wurtsmith Air Force Base, Michigan without personnel or equipment in January 1961, assuming the aircraft, personnel and equipment of the discontinued 4026th Strategic Wing'. The 4026th was a SAC Major Command controlled (MAJCON) wing that had been organized on 1 August 1958. On 15 July 1960, the 4026th was assigned its first operational unit, the 920th Air Refueling Squadron equipped with Boeing KC-135A Stratotankers. The 4026th was established by SAC in a program to disperse its Boeing B-52 Stratofortress bombers over a larger number of bases, thus making it more difficult for the Soviet Union to knock out the entire fleet with a surprise first strike. One half of the wing's aircraft were maintained on fifteen-minute alert, fully fueled and ready for combat to reduce vulnerability to a Soviet missile strike. However, it never equipped with B-52s before being replaced by the 379th. The 853d Medical Group, 910th Air Refueling Squadron and the 67th Munitions Maintenance Squadron transferred to the 379th when it replaced the 4026th, but the remaining support units of the 4026th were discontinued along with the wing.

With the B-47 being programmed for retirement, and in order to retain the lineage of 379th, Headquarters SAC received authority from Headquarters USAF to discontinue the 4026th Strategic Wing and to activate an AFCON unit which could carry a lineage and history. SAC discontinued the 4026th and in its place the newly redesignated 379th Bombardment Wing, Heavy was moved from Homestead along with its 524th Bombardment Squadron on 9 January 1961, assuming the resources of the inactivated 4026th. The 379th immediately resumed training for strategic bombardment and air refueling operations.

On 9 May 1961, the 379th took delivery of SAC's first B-52H, equipped with TF33 turbofan engines and M61 Vulcan 20mm defensive armament. By the end of June, it was fully equipped with the H series of the Stratofortress. However, these early planes were not equipped with the terrain avoidance radar designed for this type and had to be retrofitted the following year.

Personnel and KC-135 tankers from the 379th were deployed to forward bases in the Pacific to support combat operations over Southeast Asia from 1965 to 1975, however its B-52H aircraft remained at Wurtsmith on nuclear alert.

In 1977, the 379th exchanged their B-52Hs for the conventional bomb capable B-52G. In 1989, the Air Force selected Wurtsmith as one of seven bases that would house LGM-118A Peacekeeper ICBM Peacekeeper Rail Garrison. A Rail Garrison would address the survivability problem by which 25 trains, each with two missiles, would use the national railroad system to conceal themselves. It was intended that this system would become operational in late 1992, but budgetary constraints and the changing international situation led to it being scrapped.

=== Farewell to the Buff ===
Retirement of the B-52G began in the late 1980s, however the Gulf War of 1990–1991 resulted in a temporary delay in the inactivation of B-52G units. Wurtsmith-based B-52s were flown on missions against Iraq staged out of Prince Abdullah AB in Jeddah, Saudi Arabia. These planes were part of the 1708th Bombardment Wing (Provisional), a provisional wing formed from B-52s out of Barksdale, Castle, Wurtsmith, and others. The planes arrived at dawn on the first day of the air war.

One plane flew 29 missions out of Jeddah, the most of any bomber crew in the theater. During the Gulf War, 379th Bomb Wing aircraft carried the "Triangle K" tail flash in honor of their World War II predecessors and heritage.

The 379th Bombardment Wing was inactivated on 30 June 1993 as a result of the 1991 Base Realignment and Closure process which closed Wurtsmith AFB. On the overcast foggy morning of 15 December 1992, the last B-52, 57–6492, Old Crow Express, was flown to Davis–Monthan Air Force Base.

=== Twenty-first century ===
The wing was reactivated at Al Udeid Air Base, Qatar, in 2002. It has fought in Operation Iraqi Freedom, Operation Enduring Freedom, Operation New Dawn, Operation Odyssey Dawn and provided airpower to Combined Joint Task Force - Horn of Africa. The wing and its associate units operate more than 100 aircraft, providing combat power, aeromedical evacuation and intelligence support for three theaters of operations, as well as facilitating humanitarian flights.

== Lineage ==
379th Bombardment Group

- Constituted as the 379th Bombardment Group (Heavy) on 28 October 1942

Activated on 3 November 1942
Redesignated 379th Bombardment Group, Heavy c. 20 August 1943
Inactivated on 25 July 1945

- Consolidated with the 379th Bombardment Wing as the 379th Bombardment Wing on 31 January 1984

379th Air Expeditionary Wing

- Constituted as the 379th Bombardment Wing, Medium on 23 March 1953

Activated on 1 November 1955
Redesignated 379th Bombardment Wing, Heavy on 9 January 1961
Consolidated with the 379th Bombardment Group on 31 January 1984
Inactivated on 30 June 1993

- Redesignated 379th Air Expeditionary Wing and converted to provisional status on 4 December 2001
- Activated in April 2002

=== Assignments ===
- II Bomber Command, 3 November 1942 – April 1943
- 1st Bombardment Wing, May 1943 – 13 September 1943 (attached to 201st Provisional Combat Bombardment Wing after 13 May 1943)
- 41st Combat Bombardment Wing, 13 September 1943
- European Air Materiel Command, 12 – 25 July 1945
- Second Air Force, 1 November 1955 (attached to 813th Air Division)
- 823d Air Division, 1 June 1956 (attached to 5th Air Division, 6 March–12 May 1957)
- 40th Air Division, 9 January 1961
- Strategic Air Command, 8 June 1988
- Ninth Air Force, 1 June 1992 – 30 June 1993
- Air Combat Command to activate or inactivate any time after 4 December 2001.

Attached to United States Air Forces Central Command, April 2002

=== Components ===
Groups

- 64th Air Expeditionary Group, 23 September 2005 – 1 May 2014
- 379th Air Base Group (later 379th Combat Support Group, 379th Support Group, 379th Expeditionary Support Group, 379th Expeditionary Mission Support Group), 1 November 1955 – 1 June 1956, 9 January 1961 – 15 June 1993, c. 12 Dec 2001 – present
- 379th Logistics Group (later 379th Expeditionary Logistics Group, 379th Expeditionary Maintenance Group), 1 September 1991 – 15 April 1993, 12 Dec 2001 – 2 April 2024
- 379th Medical Group (see 853d Medical Group)
- 379th Operations Group (later 379th Expeditionary Operations Group), 1 September 1991 – 31 December 1992, c. 12 December 2001 – 2 April 2024
- 853d Medical Group (later USAF Hospital, Wurtsmith, 379th Strategic Hospital, 379th Medical Group, 379th Expeditionary Medical Group), 9 January 1961 – 1 May 1993, c. 12 Dec 2001 – 2 April 2024
- 379th Expeditionary Mission Support Group

Squadrons

- 19th Air Refueling Squadron, (attached 1 February–30 June 1956)
- 67th Munitions Maintenance Squadron, 9 January 1961 – 30 September 1972
- 379th Airborne Missile Maintenance Squadron, 1 November 1962 – 30 June 1974
- 379th Armament & Electronics Maintenance Squadron (later 379th Avionics Maintenance Squadron), 1 November 1955 – 1 September 1991
- 379th Field Maintenance Squadron, 1 November 1955 – 1 September 1991
- 379th Munitions Maintenance Squadron, 30 September 1972 – 1 September 1991
- 379th Periodic Maintenance Squadron (later 379th Organizational Maintenance Squadron), 1 November 1955 – 1 September 1991
- 379th Supply Squadron, 1 April 1960 – 1 July 1963, c. 1 July 1975 – 1 September 1991
- 379th Transportation Squadron, c. 1 July 1975 – 1 September 1991
- 524th Bombardment Squadron, 3 November 1942 – 25 July 1945, 1 November 1955 – 1 September 1991
- 525th Bombardment Squadron, 3 November 1942 – 25 July 1945, 1 November 1955 – 9 January 1961
- 526th Bombardment Squadron, 3 November 1942 – 25 July 1945, 1 November 1955 – 9 January 1961
- 527th Bombardment Squadron, 3 November 1942 – 25 July 1945, 1 November 1958 – 9 January 1961
- 920th Air Refueling Squadron, 9 January 1961 – 1 September 1991

Other

- USAF Hospital, Wurtsmith (see 853d Medical Group)
- 379th Strategic Hospital (see 853d Medical Group)

=== Stations ===
- Geiger Field, Washington, 3 November 1942
- Wendover Field, Utah, 19 November 1942
- Sioux City Army Air Base, Iowa, 3 February–April 1943
- RAF Kimbolton (Station 117), England, 21 May 1943 – 12 June 1945 (air echelon at RAF Bovingdon (Station 112), 24 April–21 May 1943)
- Casablanca Airfield, French Morocco, 17 June–25 July 1945
- Homestead Air Force Base, Florida, 1 November 1955
- Wurtsmith Air Force Base, Michigan, 9 January 1961 – 30 June 1993

=== Aircraft ===
- KC-97 Stratofreighter, 1956
- B-47 Stratojet, 1956–1960
- B-52 Stratofortress, 1961–1993
- KC-135 Stratotanker, 1961–1993
- McDonnell Douglas F-15C Eagle (2003–2006)
- McDonnell Douglas KC-10A Extender (2001–2003)
- Rockwell B-1B Lancer (since 2007)
- Boeing RC-135V/W Rivet Joint – present
- Northrop Grumman E-8C Joint STARS 1988-2023
- Lockheed P-3C Orion
- Boeing KC-135R Stratotanker (since 2003)
- Boeing C-17A Globemaster III (since 2006)
- Lockheed C-130H Hercules (since 2003)
- Lockheed Martin C-130J-30 Super Hercules (since 2009)
- Learjet C-21 – present

=== Awards ===
- Air Force Outstanding Unit Award (for the period 1 July 1970 to 30 June 1971)
- Omaha Trophy for the best aircraft or missile organization in the Strategic Air Command
- Commander in Chief, Strategic Air Command, Flying Wing of the Year Award (1971)
- SAC Charles D. Trail Materiel Award
- Second Air Force Sweeney Award
- Second Air Force Martensen Award
- Fairchild Trophy for the best strategic bombardment wing in SAC (1987)
- SAC Proud Shield bombing and navigation competition (1987)
- Air Force Meritorious Unit Award (for the periods 1 September 2003 to 31 May 2004, and 1 June 2005 to 31 May 2006)
- Air Force Gallant Unit Citation (for period between 1 April 2025 to 30 September 2025)

== See also ==
- List of B-47 units of the United States Air Force
- List of B-52 Units of the United States Air Force
