= 920th Air Refueling Squadron =

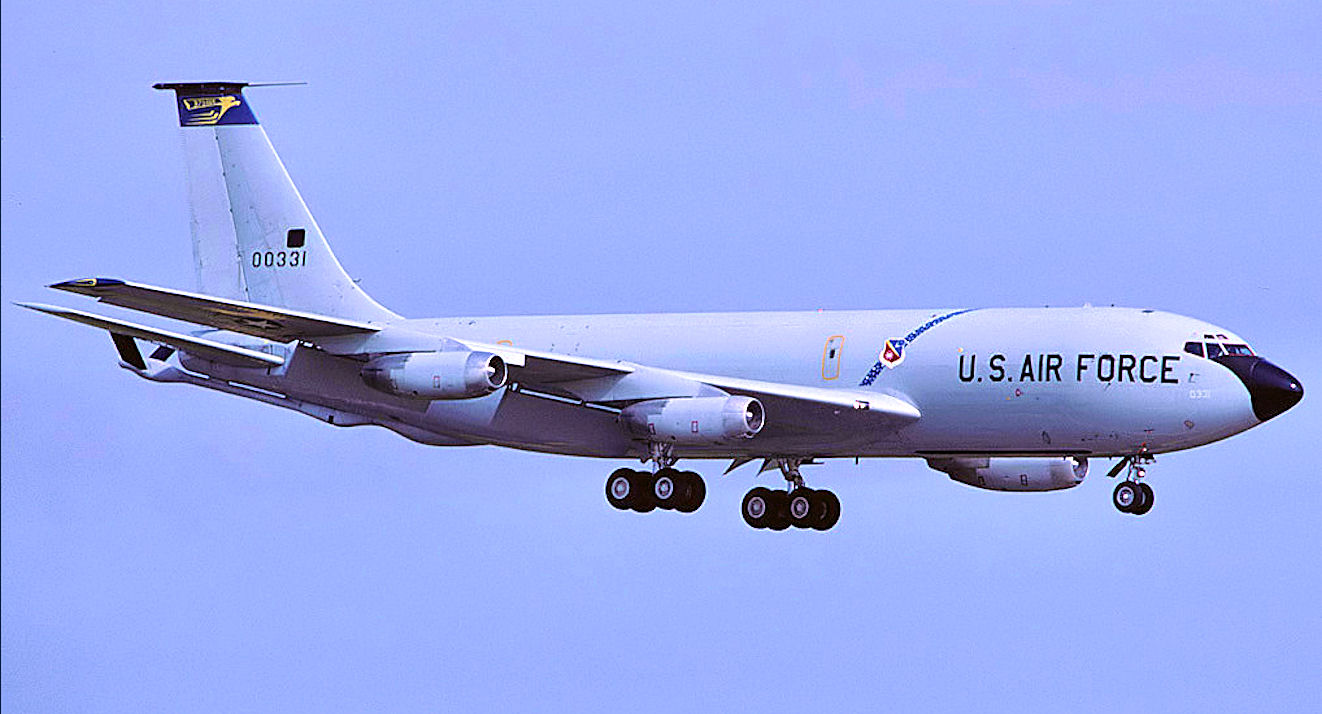
- 920th Air Refueling Squadron KC-135A Stratotanker (Note: Aircraft is Boeing KC-135A-BN Stratotanker, serial 60-0331. Note the 379th Bombardment Wing emblem on the SAC "Milky Way" band on fuselage. This plane was modified as a KC-135R in 1989.)
- Active: 1942–1944; 1944–1946; 1960–1992
- Country: United States
- Branch: United States Air Force
- Role: Air refueling
- Mottos: Any Time, Any Place
- Decorations: Air Force Outstanding Unit Award

Insignia
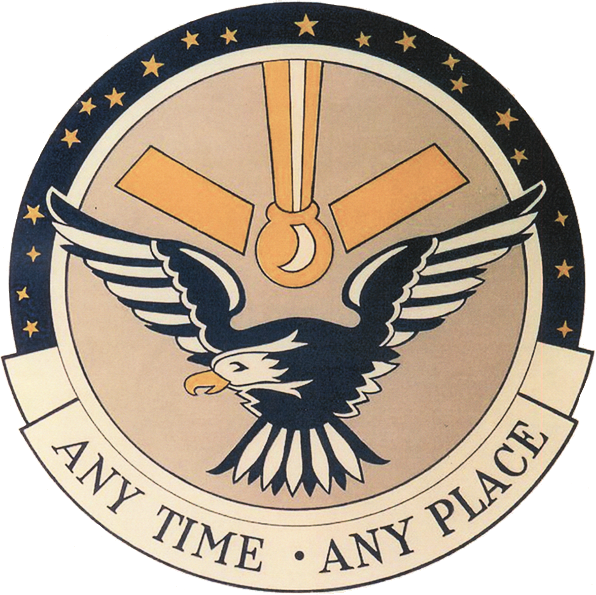
- 920th Air Refueling Squadron emblem

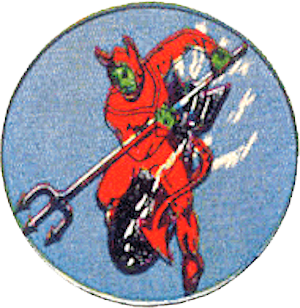
- 420th Bombardment Squadron emblem (Note: Approved 27 January 1943. Description: On a light blue disc, a red serpentine devil, green face and gloves, holding a trident black and riding a black aerial bomb, falling to base, speed lines white.)

The 920th Air Refueling Squadron is an inactive United States Air Force unit. It was last assigned to the 379th Bombardment Wing at Wurtsmith Air Force Base, Michigan where it was inactivated on 30 September 1992.

The first predecessor of the squadron was the 420th Bombardment Squadron which served as a heavy bomber operational and replacement training unit from 1942 until the spring of 1944 when it was inactivated in a general reorganization of United States Army Air Forces training units.

The 420th reformed as a Boeing B-29 Superfortress unit four months later. It partly deployed to the Pacific, but the Japanese surrender took place before the air echelon deployed and the squadron was inactivated once the ground echelon returned to the United States.

The 920th Air Refueling Squadron was activated in the spring of 1960 by Strategic Air Command at Carswell Air Force Base, Texas, but soon moved to Wurtsmith, where it served for over thirty years. The squadron maintained part of its strength on alert to support the Emergency War Order. It deployed crews and aircraft to support Strategic Air Command (SAC) and Pacific Air Forces operations during the Vietnam War. In the fall of 1985 the 920th and 420th squadrons were consolidated into a single unit. In 1992 the unit was transferred from SAC to Air Mobility Command, but was inactivated shortly after the transfer.

== History ==
=== World War II ===
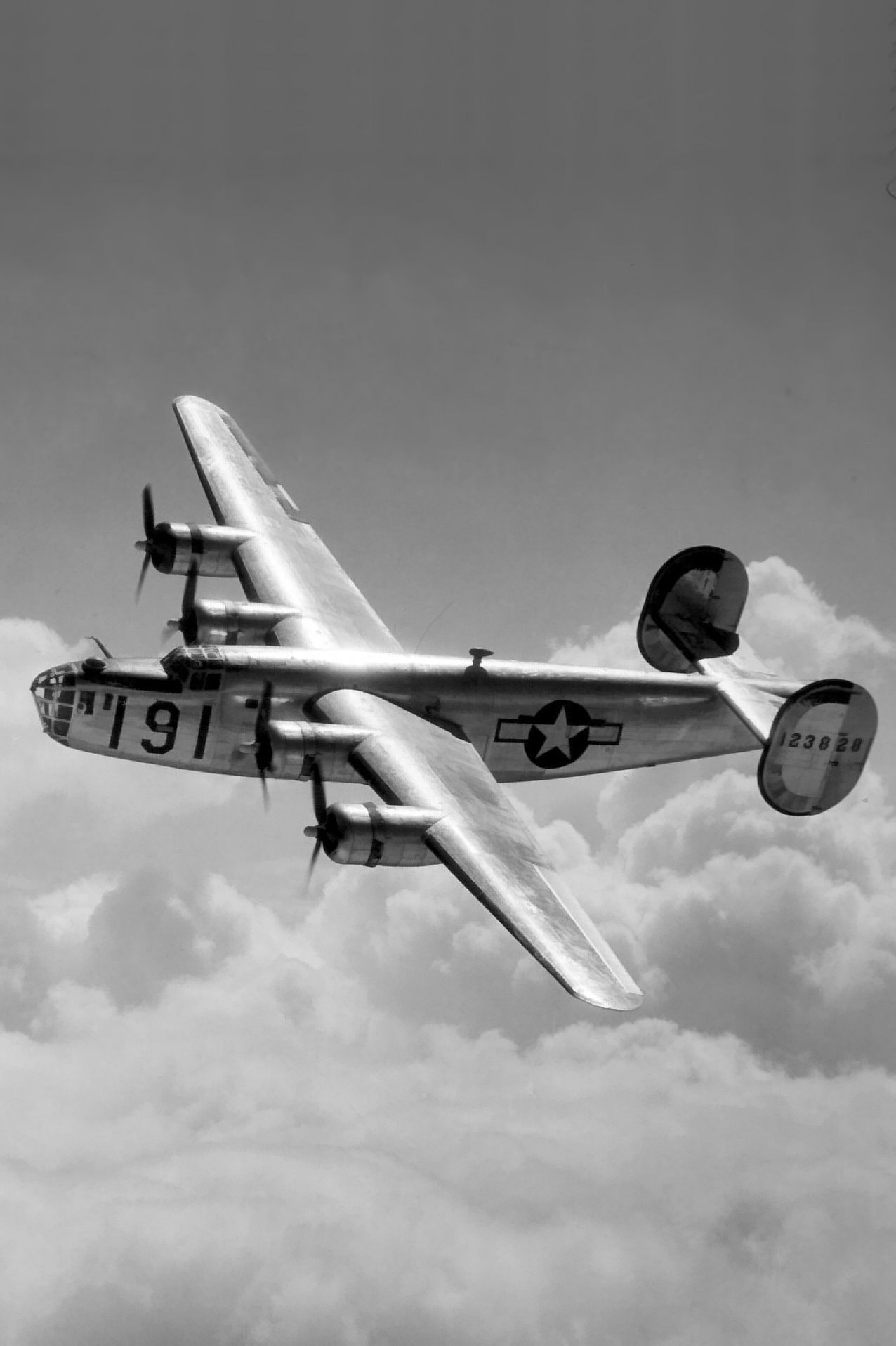
B-24 of a US-based training unit

The 30th Reconnaissance Squadron was constituted in early 1942 as a Consolidated B-24 Liberator reconnaissance unit, but its mission changed to bombardment and it was redesignated the 420th Bombardment Squadron before it was activated at Geiger Field, Washington in June 1942. It became a heavy bomber Operational Training Unit (OTU) as one of the four squadrons of the 302d Bombardment Group, which served with a training wing of Second Air Force. The OTU program involved the use of an oversized parent unit to provide cadres to "satellite groups." The 420th later became a replacement training unit (RTU) for deployed combat units. RTUs were oversized units that trained individual pilots or aircrews for units already deployed overseas. At the end of 1943 the squadron moved east with its group headquarters, where it became an element of First Air Force. However, the United States Army Air Forces found that standard military units, based on relatively inflexible tables of organization were proving less well adapted to the training mission. Accordingly, a more functional system was adopted in which each base was organized into a separate numbered unit. Accordingly, the unit was inactivated in April 1944 and its personnel transferred to the 114th Army Air Forces Base Unit (Bombardment, Heavy).

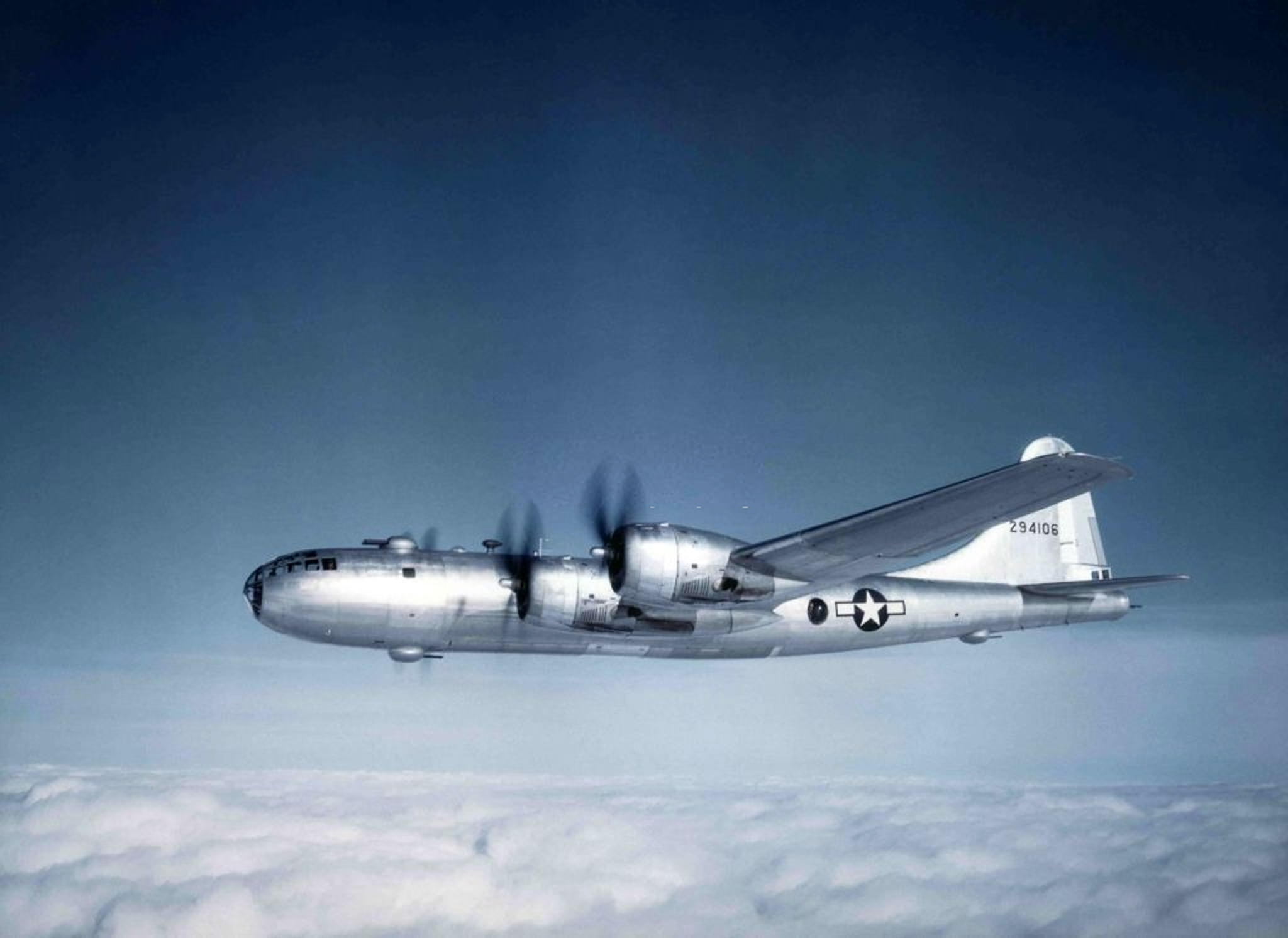
Boeing B-29 bomber

The squadron became a Boeing B-29 Superfortress very heavy bombardment squadron in August 1944 and was activated again in September 1944 at Dalhart Army Air Field as one of the three squadrons of the 382d Bombardment Group. The squadron again trained with Second Air Force. Training was considerably delayed due to equipment shortages. The unit did not begin combat training with B-29s until March 1945. The ground echelon deployed to Northern Mariana Islands by ship in early August 1945 but the air echelon remained behind until after the Japanese surrender. The ground echelon remained in the Marianas supporting other units' aircraft. The ground echelon returned to the port of embarkation in December 1945 and the unit inactivated in early January 1946.

=== Cold War & Vietnam War ===
The 920th Air Refueling Squadron was organized on 15 April 1960 by Strategic Air Command (SAC) at Carswell Air Force Base, Texas and assigned to the 7th Bombardment Wing. The squadron was apparently not equipped or manned before moving to Wurtsmith Air Force Base, Michigan on 15 July 1960, where it was assigned to the 4026th Strategic Wing and equipped with Boeing KC-135 Stratotankers. At Wurtsmith the squadron provided worldwide air refueling for SAC Boeing B-52 Stratofortress strategic bombers and other USAF aircraft as directed. One third of the squadron's aircraft were maintained on fifteen-minute alert, fully fueled and ready for combat to reduce vulnerability to a Soviet missile strike. This was increased to half the squadron's aircraft in 1962.

The squadron deployed aircraft and crews to Alaska to support Operation Chrome Dome airborne alert missions. The squadron also supported SAC reconnaissance operations in Europe. In February 1963, The 379th Bombardment Wing assumed the aircraft, personnel and equipment of the discontinued 4026th wing. The 4026th was a Major Command controlled (MAJCON) wing, which could not carry a permanent history or lineage, and SAC wanted to replace it with a permanent unit. The 920th was transferred to the newly activated 379th wing.

The 920th deployed aircraft and flight crews to the Western Pacific between 1965 and 1975 to support SAC Operation Arc Light and tactical aircraft flying combat missions over Southeast Asia during the Vietnam War. It also supported fighter aircraft deploying to Southeast Asia in Operations Coronet Town and Coronet Circle. In 1968 the squadron absorbed personnel and equipment from the 907th Air Refueling Squadron, which inactivated at Glasgow Air Force Base, Montana. During the Vietnam era, crews from the 920th were deployed to the Young Tiger Tanker Task Force, flying air refueling support from U-Tapao Royal Thai Navy Airfield. In 1975, the USAF implemented Palace Lightning, the plan to withdraw its aircraft and personnel from Thailand. All 920th aircraft and personnel left U-Tapao in December 1975, and in fact, the last SAC aircraft to leave the base and fly the final Young Tiger Tanker Task Force mission was a 920th KC-135. The aircraft departed on 21 Dec 1975, and was crewed by Capt. Gary Schreck, aircraft commander, 1st Lt. Steve Farrar, copilot, 1st Lt. Roger Rosenberry, navigator, and SSgt. Lee Evans, boom operator.

The squadron returned to normal peacetime operations after 1975. It deployed personnel and aircraft to the Middle East in 1990 in support of Operation Desert Shield and in 1991 in support of Operation Desert Storm. When SAC was inactivated in June 1992, the squadron was reassigned to the 305th Operations Group of Air Mobility Command, (AMC) which was stationed at Grissom Air Force Base, Indiana. The squadron's aircraft were assigned to other AMC units and it was inactivated on 30 September 1992.

== Lineage ==
420th Bombardment Squadron

- Constituted as the 30th Reconnaissance Squadron (Heavy) on 28 January 1942

Redesignated 420th Bombardment Squadron (Heavy) on 22 April 1942
Activated on 1 June 1942
Inactivated on 10 April 1944

- Redesignated 420th Bombardment Squadron, Very Heavy on 4 August 1944

Activated on 19 September 1944
Inactivated on 4 January 1946

- Consolidated with the 920th Air Refueling Squadron on 19 September 1985 as the 920th Air Refueling Squadron

920th Air Refueling Squadron

- Constituted as the 920th Air Refueling Squadron, Heavy on 17 February 1960 and activated (not organized)

Organized on 15 April 1960

- Consolidated with the 420th Bombardment Squadron on 19 September 1985

Redesignated 920th Air Refueling Squadron on 1 September 1991
Inactivated on 30 September 1992

=== Assignments ===
- 302d Bombardment Group: 1 June 1942 – 10 April 1944
- 382d Bombardment Group: 19 September 1944 – 4 January 1946
- Strategic Air Command: 17 February 1960 (not organized)
- 7th Bombardment Wing: 15 April 1960
- 4026th Strategic Wing: 15 June 1960
- 379th Bombardment Wing: 1 February 1963
- 379th Operations Group: 1 September 1991
- 305th Operations Group: 1 June 1992 – 30 September 1992

=== Stations ===
- Geiger Field, Washington, 1 June 1942
- Davis-Monthan Field, Arizona, 23 June 1942
- Wendover Field, Utah, 30 July 1942
- Pueblo Army Air Base, Colorado, 1 October 1942;
- Davis-Monthan Field, Arizona, 1 December 1942
- Clovis Army Air Field, New Mexico, 29 January 1943
- Langley Field, Virginia, 17 December 1943
- Chatham Army Air Field, Georgia, 10 February 1944 – 10 April 1944,
- Dalhart Army Air Field, Texas, 19 September 1944
- Smoky Hill Army Air Field, Kansas, 11 December 1944 – 1 August 1945
- Guam, 8 September 1945 (ground echelon only. Air echelon remained in US until inactivation)
- Tinian, c. October 1945 – 15 December 1945 (ground echelon)
- Camp Anza, California, 28 December 1945 – 4 January 1946
- Carswell Air Force Base, Texas, 15 April 1960
- Wurtsmith Air Force Base, Michigan, 15 June 1960 – 30 September 1992

=== Aircraft ===
- Consolidated B-24 Liberator, 1942–1944
- Boeing B-29 Superfortress, 1945
- Boeing KC-135A Stratotanker, 1960–1992

=== Awards and campaigns ===
Award streamer	Award	Dates	Notes
	Air Force Outstanding Unit Award	1 July 1963 – 30 June 1964	920th Air Refueling Squadron
	Air Force Outstanding Unit Award	1 July 1970 – 30 June 1971	920th Air Refueling Squadron

Service Streamer	Campaign	Dates	Notes
	American Theater without inscription	1 June 1942 – 10 April 1944, 19 September 1944 – 4 January 1946	420th Bombardment Squadron
	Asiatic-Pacific Theater without inscription	8 September 1945 – 15 December 1945	420th Bombardment Squadron

== See also ==
- List of United States Air Force air refueling squadrons
- List of B-29 Superfortress operators
- B-24 Liberator units of the United States Army Air Forces
- List of MAJCOM wings of the United States Air Force
- List of USAF Bomb Wings and Wings assigned to Strategic Air Command
- List of USAF Strategic Wings assigned to the Strategic Air Command
