= 763d Expeditionary Reconnaissance Squadron =

- Country: United States
- Branch: United States Air Force
- Role: Reconnaissance
- Size: Squadron
- Part of: 379th Expeditionary Operations Group
- Garrison/HQ: Al Udeid Air Base

Aircraft flown
- Reconnaissance: Boeing RC-135V/W

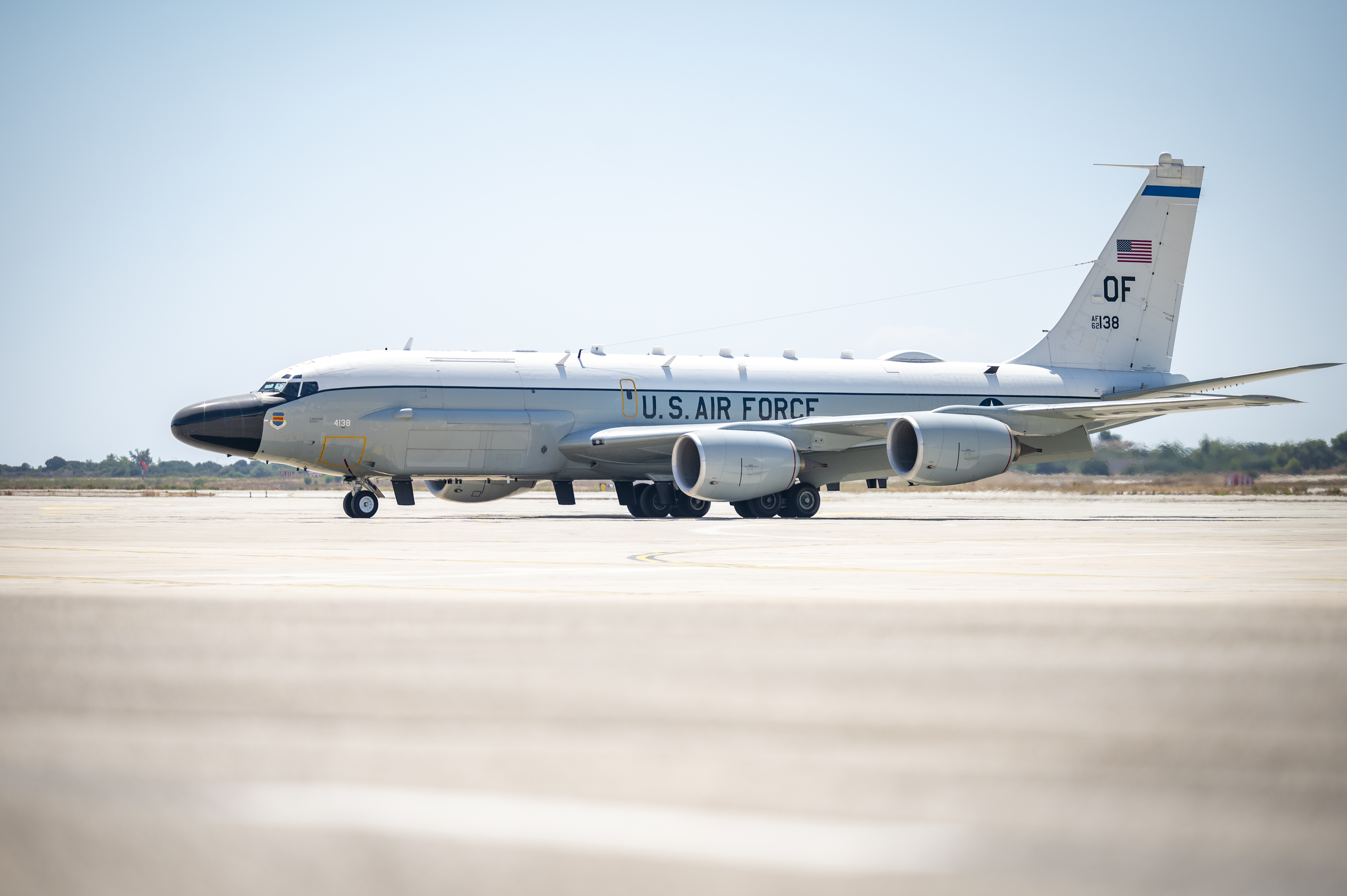
A Boeing RC-135W of the 763rd ERS at Naval Support Activity Souda Bay

The 763d Expeditionary Reconnaissance Squadron is a reconnaissance squadron of the United States Air Force currently assigned to 379th Expeditionary Operations Group, a United States Air Forces Central Command unit.

On August 9, 1990, the first RC-135 Rivet Joint mission of the 55th Wing flew over the U.S. Central Command area of responsibility. That mission officially began the 4077th Reconnaissance Squadron. In 1998 the name changed to the 763rd Expeditionary Reconnaissance Squadron.

== See also ==
- List of United States Air Force reconnaissance squadrons
