= Wurtsmith Air Force Base =

US Air Force base

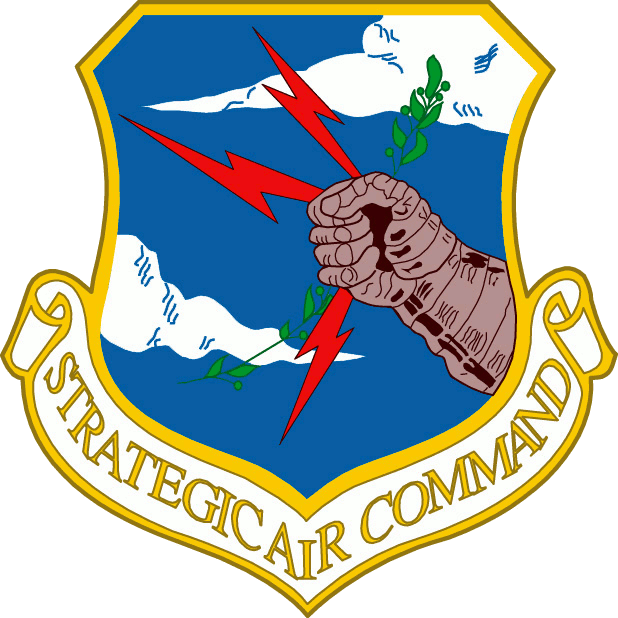
Wurtsmith Air Force Base
- Part of Air/Aersopace Defense Command (ADC) and Strategic Air Command (SAC)
- Oscoda Township, Iosco County, State of Michigan, United States of America
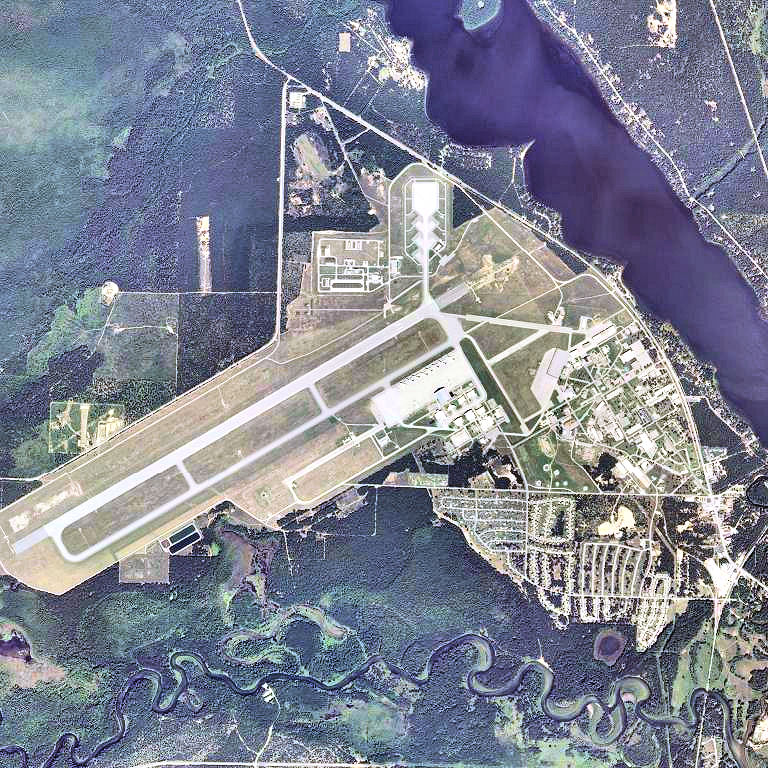
- 2006 USGS Airphoto. Note the christmas tree alert staging area at top center.

Site information
- Type: Air Force Base
- Controlled by: United States Air Force

Location
- Location of Wurtsmith Air Force Base
- Coordinates: 44°27′09″N 083°22′49″W

Site history
- Built: 1923
- In use: 1923–1993

Garrison information
- Garrison: 379th Bombardment Wing

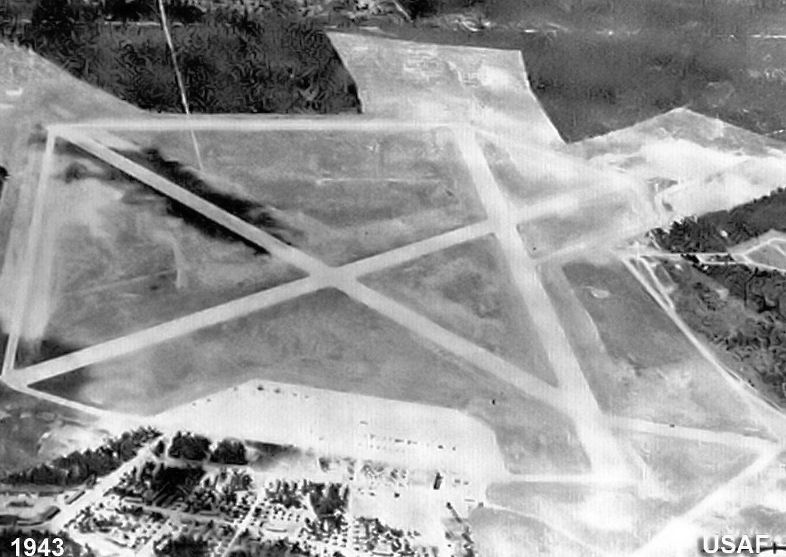
Oscoda Army Airfield, 1943

Wurtsmith Air Force Base is a decommissioned United States Air Force base in Iosco County, Michigan. Near Lake Huron, it operated for seventy years, from 1923 until decommissioned in 1993. On January 18, 1994, Wurtsmith was listed as a Superfund site, due to extensive groundwater contamination with heavy metals, polycyclic aromatic hydrocarbons, volatile organic compounds, including trichloroethylene, 1,1-dichloroethane, 1,1,1-trichloroethane, and vinyl chloride. In 2010, Per- and polyfluoroalkyl substances contamination was discovered, and as of 2022 remediation is still ongoing.

During the Cold War, Wurtsmith was one of three Strategic Air Command (SAC) bases in Michigan with the B-52 bomber, the others (Kincheloe AFB and Sawyer AFB) were in the Upper Peninsula. The base was named in honor of Major General Paul Wurtsmith, commander of SAC's Eighth Air Force, who was killed when his B-25 Mitchell bomber crashed on Cold Mountain near Asheville, North Carolina, on September 13, 1946.

In 2022, Granot Loma was being touted as a potential space port in the Upper Peninsula, in tandem with Wurtsmith.

== Previous names ==
- Camp Skeel, November 1931
- Oscoda Army Air Field, August 1942
- Oscoda Air Force Base, 24 June 1948
- Wurtsmith Air Force Base, 15 February 1953 – 30 June 1993

== Major commands to which assigned ==
- General Headquarters Air Force, 26 June 1936
- Third Air Force, 2 September 1942
- Air Service Command, 12 December 1942
- Third Air Force, 5 March 1943
- First Air Force, 14 August 1943
- Continental Air Forces, 16 April 1945

Re-designated Strategic Air Command, 21 March 1946

- Continental Air Command,1 January 1949
- Air Defense Command, 1 January 1951
- Strategic Air Command, 1 April 1960
- Air Combat Command, 1 June 1992 – 30 June 1993

== Major units assigned ==
- First Pursuit Group, 15 October 1927
- 100th Base HQ and Air Base Squadron, 31 October 1942
- 524th Base HQ and Air Base Squadron, 21 June 1943
- 134th AAF Base Unit, 14 April 1944 – 12 April 1945
- 4301st Base Services Squadron, 1 August 1948

Re-designated 2476th Base Service Squadron, 1 January 1949
Re-designated 4655th Base Service Squadron, 1 December 1950

- 332d Fighter Group, 2 April 1943 – 9 July 1943
- 100th Fighter Squadron, 29 October 1943 – 8 November 1943
- 301st Fighter Squadron, 21 May 1943 – 10 July 1943
- 302d Fighter Squadron, 19 November 1943 – December 1943
- 403d Fighter Squadron, May 1943 – 15 December 1943
- 754th Aircraft Control and Warning Squadron, 27 November 1950 – 20 July 1951
- 63d Fighter-Interceptor Squadron, 5 January 1951 – 17 August 1955
- 527th Air Service Group

Re-designated 527th Air Defense Group, 16 February 1953 – 15 October 1955

- 75th Fighter-Interceptor Squadron, 1 October 1968 - 30 November 1969
- 445th Fighter-Interceptor Squadron, 15 August 1955 – 30 September 1968
- 31st Fighter-Interceptor Squadron, 8 June 1956 – 20 August 1957
- 18th Fighter-Interceptor Squadron, 20 August 1957 – 27 April 1960
- 4026th Strategic Wing, 1 August 1958 – 9 January 1961
- 40th Air Division, 1 July 1959 – 8 June 1988
- 920th Air Refueling Squadron, 15 July 1960 – 15 June 1993
- 379th Bombardment Wing, 9 January 1961 – 30 June 1993
- 94th Fighter-Interceptor Squadron, 1 December 1969 - 30 June 1971

== Environmental contamination ==
On January 18, 1994 Wurtsmith was listed as a Superfund due to extensive groundwater contamination with heavy metals, polycyclic aromatic hydrocarbons, volatile organic compounds, including trichloroethylene, 1,1-dichloroethane, 1,1,1-trichloroethane, and vinyl chloride.

In March 2010 the Michigan Department of Environment, Great Lakes, and Energy (EGLE) became aware of Per- and polyfluoroalkyl substances concentrations in groundwater, when EGLE staff sampled at a former fire training area on the base. Air Force completed the PFAS Preliminary Assessment, Site Inspection, and planned the Remedial Investigation under the Comprehensive Environmental Response, Compensation, and Liability Act. Air Force performed three removal actions and planned two interim remedial actions. On November 1, 2017, more than twenty-two years after being listed as a superfundsite Wurtsmith held its first Restoration Advisory Board meeting.

During the COVID-19 pandemic, Wurtsmith Restoration Advisory Board (RAB) meetings became virtual events, yet in August 2021 RAB members said that progress was made on the WAFB cleanup, and that the relationship between the Air Force and the community has improved.

== See also ==
- Michigan World War II Army Airfields
- Central Air Defense Force (Air Defense Command)
