= Camp Anza =

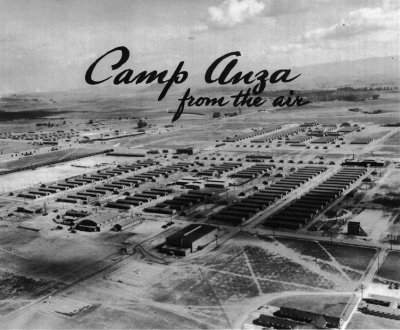
- US Army Camp Camp Anza in 1945

- Location within California
- 33°56′35″N 117°27′47″W
- Location: Riverside, California

History
- Built: 1942

Site notes
- Area: 1,240 acres (500 ha)
- Architect: US Army

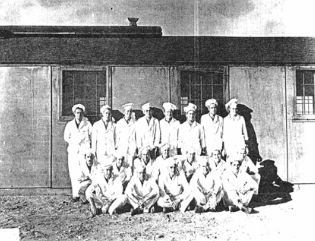
Camp Anza in 1945 US Army cooking training

Camp Anza was a United States Army installation, in Riverside, California, during World War II. Construction began on July 3, 1942, and was completed on February 15, 1943. The camp was named after Juan Bautista de Anza, an early explorer who camped near the site in 1774. The US Army purchased the 1,240-acre site from the Willits J. Hole Ranch (1910–1942), a barley and wheat farm. Before 1910 the land was part of Rancho La Sierra (1797–1910).

The post was activated on December 2, 1942, initially designated as Arlington Staging Area and Arlington Special Training Center, and renamed Camp Anza on December 12, 1942. Camp Anza was a large army base with 512 buildings housing 20,000 troops. Over 600,000 troops were processed over the three years of use. The camp had over a hundred wood barracks. Also Built were: headquarters, recreation rooms, chapel, laundry building, Southern Pacific Railroad station, library, fire station, newspaper print room (Anza Zip), 2,000 seat outdoor theater, water storage tower, motor pool, heating plant, and mess halls. Bob Hope, Jack Benny and Eddie Cantor often entertained troops there. The Pepsodent Show Starring Bob Hope, a radio shows was broadcast from the camp one night. Most troops at the camp were shipped out at the Los Angeles Port of Embarkation at Camp Ross. Before departing troops had immunizations, gas masks training, completed a will, had rope ladder climbing training, recorded personal property, and at Hole Lake, abandoned ship training. Possessing took eight to ten days before shipping out to the Pacific War. In August, 1945, returning troops started to arrive at Camp Anza. To serve the troops the camp also had a camp hospital. The 8th Italian Quartermaster Service Company, one of many Italian Service Units worked at Camp Anza. Camp Anza was deactivated on March 31, 1946.

Philip H. Philbin Jr. purchased the camp in 1948 for $510,000. Philbin sold off much of the camp. Six local schools starting using the former camp. The street layout of the camp was kept. A housing subdivision called Anza Village and Arlanza Neighborhood was built on the land. Today there remains: a few barracks, chapel, the headquarters, laundry facility, officer's club and warehouse; all reused buildings. The city has a Historical Resources Inventory of the buildings.

Units stationed at the camp:

- 229th Military Police Company (Zone of the Interior) (ASF)
- 1941st Service Command Unit (Station Complement) (ASF)
- 8th Italian Quartermaster Service Company (ASF)
- 385th Army Service Forces Band (ASF)
- Detachment, 9206th Transportation Corps Technical Service Unit (Los Angeles Port of Embarkation (ASF)
- 22nd Army Air Forces Base Unit (Army Air Forces Command Group, Non-Divisional Unit) (AAF)

== See also ==
- American Theater (1939–1945)
- California during World War II
- Desert Training Center
- Military history of the United States during World War II
- United States home front during World War II
