= List of NCIS episodes =

NCIS and its characters were originally introduced in a two-part episode of the CBS television series JAG in April 2003. The show premiered on September 23, 2003, in the United States.

Created by Donald P. Bellisario and Don McGill, and executive produced by Bellisario, Shane Brennan, Gary Glasberg, George Schenck, Frank Cardea, and Steven D. Binder, NCIS stars Mark Harmon as Supervisory Special Agent Leroy Jethro Gibbs, and Gary Cole as Supervisory Special Agent Alden Parker in charge of NCIS' Major Case Response Team. Based out of Washington, D.C., the team includes special agents Caitlin Todd (Sasha Alexander), Anthony DiNozzo (Michael Weatherly), Timothy McGee (Sean Murray), Ziva David (Cote de Pablo), Eleanor Bishop (Emily Wickersham), Alexandra Quinn (Jennifer Esposito), Nicholas Torres (Wilmer Valderrama), and Jessica Knight (Katrina Law), forensic specialists Abby Sciuto (Pauley Perrette) and Kasie Hines (Diona Reasonover), medical examiners Jimmy Palmer (Brian Dietzen) and Donald "Ducky" Mallard (David McCallum), medical examiners assistant Gerald Jackson (Pancho Demmings) and SIS attaché Clayton Reeves (Duane Henry). Operational psychologist Dr. Jacqueline Sloane (Maria Bello) assists the team during troubled times, while successive Directors Tom Morrow (Alan Dale), Jennifer Shepard (Lauren Holly), and Leon Vance (Rocky Carroll) command from on high.

As of November 17, 2026, 513 episodes of NCIS have aired, currently in its twenty-fourth season.

== Series overview ==
Season	Episodes	Originally released		Rank	Rating
Season	Episodes	First released	Last released	Rank	Rating
Intro	2	April 22, 2003	April 29, 2003	—N/a	—N/a
1	23	September 23, 2003	May 25, 2004	23	7.8
2	23	September 28, 2004	May 24, 2005	22	8.8
3	24	September 20, 2005	May 16, 2006	12	9.8
4	24	September 19, 2006	May 22, 2007	15	9.0
5	19	September 25, 2007	May 20, 2008	11	9.2
6	25	September 23, 2008	May 19, 2009	5	10.9
7	24	September 22, 2009	May 25, 2010	4	11.5
8	24	September 21, 2010	May 17, 2011	5	11.8
9	24	September 20, 2011	May 15, 2012	2	12.3
10	24	September 25, 2012	May 14, 2013	1	13.5
11	24	September 24, 2013	May 13, 2014	1	12.6
12	24	September 23, 2014	May 12, 2015	2	11.6
13	24	September 22, 2015	May 17, 2016	1	12.8
14	24	September 20, 2016	May 16, 2017	2	11.4
15	24	September 26, 2017	May 22, 2018	2	10.3
16	24	September 25, 2018	May 21, 2019	3	9.6
17	20	September 24, 2019	April 14, 2020	3	10.1
18	16	November 17, 2020	May 25, 2021	4	10.3
19	21	September 20, 2021	May 23, 2022	4	11.9
20	22	September 19, 2022	May 22, 2023	3	12.7
21	10	February 12, 2024	May 6, 2024	4	9.66
22	20	October 14, 2024	May 5, 2025	11	10.59
23	20	October 14, 2025	May 12, 2026	9	10.00
24	TBA	October 6, 2026	TBA	TBA	TBA

== Episodes ==
=== Introductory episodes ===
The program and its characters are introduced during the eighth season of JAG. The JAG episodes, "Ice Queen" and "Meltdown", served as pilot episodes for the show. The character Special Agent Vivian Blackadder (Robyn Lively) does not appear in the series because producer Donald Bellisario felt that "she was a little soft for this kind of role". In October 2003, the two episodes were edited together and aired as "Navy NCIS: The Beginning".

No. overall	No. in season	Title	Directed by	Written by	Original release date	Prod. code	U.S. viewers (millions)
178	20	"Ice Queen"	Donald P. Bellisario	Donald P. Bellisario & Don McGill	April 22, 2003	178	13.84
The NCIS team is called in to investigate the mysterious death of a JAG officer, Lieutenant Loren Singer, when a young Boy Scout looking for his stray arrow discovers her body. As a result, a full murder investigation is opened and the NCIS team are tasked with finding a suspect for Lt. Singer's murder while interviewing her former JAG colleagues. The episode ends with Harmon Rabb being read his rights before Special Agent Leroy Jethro Gibbs officially declares him to be the main suspect in the case and as such, Rabb is arrested by NCIS for Lt. Singer's murder.
179	21	"Meltdown"	Scott Brazil	Donald P. Bellisario & Don McGill	April 29, 2003	179	13.63
Harmon Rabb is court-martialed for the murder of Lieutenant Singer and he does not appear to have an alibi which means that if he is not proven innocent, he could end up in the brig for life. Soon Special Agent DiNozzo realizes the case is too perfect and starts searching for another possible suspect, one who might have a long-standing grudge against Rabb. Meanwhile, Gibbs tries to get information from Amad Bin Atwa, a terrorist, before there is another attack on an American ship.

=== Season 1 (2003–04) ===
- Sean Murray (Timothy McGee) first appears episode 7 "Sub Rosa", has one scene in episode 11 “Eye Spy”, then from episode 18–23 has a continuous arc.
- It was called Navy NCIS

No. overall	No. in season	Title	Directed by	Written by	Original release date	Prod. code	U.S. viewers (millions)
1	1	"Yankee White"	Donald P. Bellisario	Teleplay by : Donald P. Bellisario; Story by : Donald P. Bellisario & Don McGill	September 23, 2003	101	13.04
2	2	"Hung Out to Dry"	Alan J. Levi	Don McGill	September 30, 2003	102	12.08
3	3	"Seadog"	Bradford May	John C. Kelley & Donald P. Bellisario	October 7, 2003	103	12.39
4	4	"The Immortals"	Alan J. Levi	Darcy Meyers	October 14, 2003	104	11.70
5	5	"The Curse"	Terrence O'Hara	Teleplay by : Don McGill & Jeff Vlaming & Donald P. Bellisario; Story by : Donald P. Bellisario	October 28, 2003	105	13.50
6	6	"High Seas"	Dennis Smith	Teleplay by : Jeff Vlaming & Larry Moskowitz; Story by : Jeff Vlaming	November 4, 2003	106	11.77
7	7	"Sub Rosa"	Michael Zinberg	George Schenck & Frank Cardea	November 18, 2003	107	13.21
8	8	"Minimum Security"	Ian Toynton	Philip DeGuere, Jr. & Donald P. Bellisario	November 25, 2003	108	12.71
9	9	"Marine Down"	Dennis Smith	John C. Kelley	December 16, 2003	109	12.03
10	10	"Left for Dead"	James Whitmore Jr.	Teleplay by : Don McGill & Donald P. Bellisario; Story by : Don McGill	January 6, 2004	110	14.51
11	11	"Eye Spy"	Alan J. Levi	George Schenck & Frank Cardea & Dana Coen	January 13, 2004	111	14.00
12	12	"My Other Left Foot"	Jeff Woolnough	Jack Bernstein	February 3, 2004	112	10.97
13	13	"One Shot, One Kill"	Peter Ellis	Gil Grant	February 10, 2004	113	13.18
14	14	"The Good Samaritan"	Alan J. Levi	Jack Bernstein	February 17, 2004	114	13.49
15	15	"Enigma"	Thomas J. Wright	John C. Kelley	February 24, 2004	115	12.14
16	16	"Bête Noire"	Peter Ellis	Donald P. Bellisario	March 2, 2004	116	12.82
17	17	"The Truth Is Out There"	Dennis Smith	Jack Bernstein	March 16, 2004	117	13.29
18	18	"UnSEALeD"	Peter Ellis	Thomas L. Moran	April 6, 2004	118	10.83
19	19	"Dead Man Talking"	Dennis Smith	George Schenck & Frank Cardea	April 27, 2004	119	11.64
20	20	"Missing"	Jeff Woolnough	John C. Kelley	May 4, 2004	120	10.13
21	21	"Split Decision"	Terrence O'Hara	Bob Gookin	May 11, 2004	121	11.07
22	22	"A Weak Link"	Alan J. Levi	Jack Bernstein	May 18, 2004	122	10.39
23	23	"Reveille"	Thomas J. Wright	Donald P. Bellisario	May 25, 2004	123	10.86

=== Season 2 (2004–05) ===
- Sean Murray (Timothy McGee) was promoted to the main cast starting with the episode "See No Evil".
- It was called Naval Criminal Investigative Service

No. overall	No. in season	Title	Directed by	Written by	Original release date	Prod. code	U.S. viewers (millions)
24	1	"See No Evil"	Thomas J. Wright	Chris Crowe	September 28, 2004	201	14.33
25	2	"The Good Wives Club"	Dennis Smith	Gil Grant	October 5, 2004	202	14.28
26	3	"Vanished"	James Whitmore Jr.	George Schenck & Frank Cardea	October 12, 2004	203	14.86
27	4	"Lt. Jane Doe"	Dan Lerner	Teleplay by : Steven Long Mitchell & Craig W. Van Sickle & Donald P. Bellisario & Gil Grant; Story by : Steven Long Mitchell & Craig W. Van Sickle	October 19, 2004	204	14.05
28	5	"The Bone Yard"	Terrence O'Hara	John C. Kelley	October 26, 2004	205	13.68
29	6	"Terminal Leave"	Jeff Woolnough	Roger Director	November 16, 2004	206	15.27
30	7	"Call of Silence"	Thomas J. Wright	Roger Director	November 23, 2004	207	14.71
31	8	"Heart Break"	Dennis Smith	George Schenck & Frank Cardea	November 30, 2004	208	15.65
32	9	"Forced Entry"	Dennis Smith	Jesse Stern & John C. Kelley	December 7, 2004	209	14.59
33	10	"Chained"	Thomas J. Wright	Frank Military	December 14, 2004	210	14.64
34	11	"Black Water"	Terrence O'Hara	Teleplay by : John C. Kelley & Juan Carlos Coto; Story by : Juan Carlos Coto	January 11, 2005	211	15.40
35	12	"Doppelgänger"	Terrence O'Hara	Jack Bernstein	January 18, 2005	212	14.53
36	13	"The Meat Puzzle"	Thomas J. Wright	Frank Military	February 8, 2005	213	12.74
37	14	"Witness"	James Whitmore Jr.	George Schenck & Frank Cardea	February 15, 2005	214	13.40
38	15	"Caught on Tape"	Jeff Woolnough	Chris Crowe & Gil Grant & John C. Kelley	February 22, 2005	215	13.59
39	16	"Pop Life"	Thomas J. Wright	Frank Military	March 1, 2005	216	13.68
40	17	"An Eye for an Eye"	Dennis Smith	Steven Kane	March 22, 2005	217	14.86
41	18	"Bikini Wax"	Stephen Cragg	David J. North	March 29, 2005	218	14.27
42	19	"Conspiracy Theory"	Jeff Woolnough	Frank Military	April 12, 2005	219	13.89
43	20	"Red Cell"	Dennis Smith	Christopher Silber	April 26, 2005	220	13.67
44	21	"Hometown Hero"	James Whitmore Jr.	George Schenck & Frank Cardea	May 3, 2005	221	13.55
45	22	"SWAK"	Dennis Smith	Donald P. Bellisario	May 10, 2005	222	13.58
46	23	"Twilight"	Thomas J. Wright	John C. Kelley	May 24, 2005	223	14.74

=== Season 3 (2005–06) ===
- Sasha Alexander (Caitlin Todd) left the show after the 2-part premiere (”Kill Ari”).
- Cote de Pablo (Ziva David) had a continuous arc starting with the first two episodes ("Kill Ari"), and later promoted to the main cast in the episode "Silver War".
- Lauren Holly joins the supporting cast as NCIS Director Jenny Shepard. She was promoted to the main cast in the ninth episode ("Frame Up").

No. overall	No. in season	Title	Directed by	Written by	Original release date	Prod. code	U.S. viewers (millions)
47	1	"Kill Ari"	Dennis Smith	Donald P. Bellisario	September 20, 2005	302	15.48
48	2	"Kill Ari"	James Whitmore Jr.	Donald P. Bellisario	September 27, 2005	304	15.09
49	3	"Mind Games"	William Webb	Teleplay by : Jeffrey A. Kirkpatrick & John C. Kelley; Story by : Jeffrey A. Kirkpatrick	October 4, 2005	301	16.87
50	4	"Silver War"	Terrence O'Hara	Teleplay by : John C. Kelley; Story by : Joshua Lurie	October 11, 2005	305	16.78
51	5	"Switch"	Thomas J. Wright	Gil Grant	October 18, 2005	303	17.69
52	6	"The Voyeur's Web"	Dennis Smith	David J. North	October 25, 2005	306	18.01
53	7	"Honor Code"	Colin Bucksey	Christopher Silber	November 1, 2005	307	18.08
54	8	"Under Covers"	Aaron Lipstadt	L.D. Zlotoff	November 8, 2005	308	17.79
55	9	"Frame Up"	Thomas J. Wright	Laurence Walsh	November 22, 2005	309	16.43
56	10	"Probie"	Terrence O'Hara	George Schenck & Frank Cardea	November 29, 2005	310	18.17
57	11	"Model Behavior"	Stephen Cragg	David J. North	December 13, 2005	311	17.11
58	12	"Boxed In"	Dennis Smith	Dana Coen	January 10, 2006	313	17.19
59	13	"Deception"	Leslie Libman	Jack Bernstein	January 17, 2006	312	17.74
60	14	"Light Sleeper"	Colin Bucksey	Christopher Silber	January 24, 2006	314	16.97
61	15	"Head Case"	Dennis Smith	George Schenck & Frank Cardea	February 7, 2006	315	16.05
62	16	"Family Secret"	James Whitmore Jr.	Steven D. Binder	February 28, 2006	316	15.14
63	17	"Ravenous"	Thomas J. Wright	Richard C. Arthur	March 7, 2006	317	17.21
64	18	"Bait"	Terrence O'Hara	Laurence Walsh	March 14, 2006	318	17.55
65	19	"Iced"	Dennis Smith	Dana Coen	April 4, 2006	319	15.52
66	20	"Untouchable"	Leslie Libman	George Schenck & Frank Cardea	April 18, 2006	320	15.90
67	21	"Bloodbath"	Dennis Smith	Steven D. Binder	April 25, 2006	321	15.56
68	22	"Jeopardy"	James Whitmore Jr.	David J. North	May 2, 2006	322	14.95
69	23	"Hiatus"	Dennis Smith	Donald P. Bellisario	May 9, 2006	323	15.71
70	24	"Hiatus"	Dennis Smith	Donald P. Bellisario	May 16, 2006	324	16.49

=== Season 4 (2006–07) ===
No. overall	No. in season	Title	Directed by	Written by	Original release date	Prod. code	U.S. viewers (millions)
71	1	"Shalom"	William Webb	Teleplay by : John C. Kelley; Story by : Donald P. Bellisario & John C. Kelley	September 19, 2006	401	13.48
72	2	"Escaped"	Dennis Smith	Teleplay by : Steven D. Binder; Story by : Christopher Silber & Steven D. Binder	September 26, 2006	402	14.12
73	3	"Singled Out"	Terrence O'Hara	David J. North	October 3, 2006	403	15.89
74	4	"Faking It"	Thomas J. Wright	Shane Brennan	October 10, 2006	404	15.86
75	5	"Dead and Unburied"	Colin Bucksey	Nell Scovell	October 17, 2006	405	15.92
76	6	"Witch Hunt"	James Whitmore Jr.	Steven Kriozere	October 31, 2006	407	15.94
77	7	"Sandblast"	Dennis Smith	Robert Palm	November 7, 2006	406	15.44
78	8	"Once a Hero"	Thomas J. Wright	Shane Brennan	November 14, 2006	408	15.80
79	9	"Twisted Sister"	Terrence O'Hara	Steven D. Binder	November 21, 2006	409	17.00
80	10	"Smoked"	Dennis Smith	John C. Kelley & Robert Palm	November 28, 2006	410	17.96
81	11	"Driven"	Dennis Smith	Teleplay by : Richard C. Arthur & Nell Scovell & John C. Kelley; Story by : Richard C. Arthur	December 12, 2006	411	17.39
82	12	"Suspicion"	Colin Bucksey	Shane Brennan	January 16, 2007	412	15.95
83	13	"Sharif Returns"	Terrence O'Hara	Steven D. Binder	January 23, 2007	413	14.83
84	14	"Blowback"	Thomas J. Wright	Teleplay by : Christopher Silber & David J. North & Shane Brennan; Story by : Christopher Silber	February 6, 2007	414	16.16
85	15	"Friends & Lovers"	Dennis Smith	John C. Kelley	February 13, 2007	415	15.36
86	16	"Dead Man Walking"	Colin Bucksey	Nell Scovell	February 20, 2007	416	15.41
87	17	"Skeletons"	James Whitmore Jr.	Jesse Stern	February 27, 2007	417	16.16
88	18	"Iceman"	Thomas J. Wright	Shane Brennan	March 20, 2007	418	15.69
89	19	"Grace Period"	James Whitmore Jr.	John C. Kelley	April 3, 2007	419	13.79
90	20	"Cover Story"	Dennis Smith	David J. North	April 10, 2007	420	14.38
91	21	"Brothers in Arms"	Martha Mitchell	Steven D. Binder	April 24, 2007	421	14.17
92	22	"In the Dark"	Thomas J. Wright	Steven D. Binder	May 1, 2007	422	13.83
93	23	"Trojan Horse"	Terrence O'Hara	Donald P. Bellisario & Shane Brennan	May 8, 2007	423	13.88
94	24	"Angel of Death"	Dennis Smith	Donald P. Bellisario	May 22, 2007	424	14.14

=== Season 5 (2007–08) ===
- Rocky Carroll (Leon Vance) had a continuous arc starting with episode 14 ("Internal Affairs").
- Lauren Holly (Jenny Shepard) left the show after the season finale ("Judgment Day").
- This season was planned to consist of 24 episodes, but due to the 2007–08 Writers Guild of America strike, only 19 episodes were produced.

No. overall	No. in season	Title	Directed by	Written by	Original release date	Prod. code	U.S. viewers (millions)
95	1	"Bury Your Dead"	Thomas J. Wright	Shane Brennan	September 25, 2007	501	13.89
96	2	"Family"	Martha Mitchell	Steven D. Binder	October 2, 2007	502	16.43
97	3	"Ex-File"	Dennis Smith	Alfonso H. Moreno	October 9, 2007	503	16.36
98	4	"Identity Crisis"	Thomas J. Wright	Jesse Stern	October 16, 2007	504	17.55
99	5	"Leap of Faith"	Dennis Smith	George Schenck & Frank Cardea	October 23, 2007	505	17.26
100	6	"Chimera"	Terrence O'Hara	Dan E. Fesman	October 30, 2007	507	16.33
101	7	"Requiem"	Tony Wharmby	Shane Brennan	November 6, 2007	506	18.15
102	8	"Designated Target"	Colin Bucksey	Reed Steiner	November 13, 2007	508	17.39
103	9	"Lost & Found"	Martha Mitchell	David J. North	November 20, 2007	509	17.34
104	10	"Corporal Punishment"	Arvin Brown	Jesse Stern	November 27, 2007	510	17.04
105	11	"Tribes"	Colin Bucksey	Reed Steiner	January 15, 2008	511	15.82
106	12	"Stakeout"	Tony Wharmby	George Schenck & Frank Cardea	April 8, 2008	512	14.05
107	13	"Dog Tags"	Oz Scott	Dan E. Fesman & Alfonso H. Moreno	April 15, 2008	513	15.13
108	14	"Internal Affairs"	Tony Wharmby	Jesse Stern & Reed Steiner	April 22, 2008	514	14.24
109	15	"In the Zone"	Terrence O'Hara	Linda Burstyn	April 29, 2008	515	14.76
110	16	"Recoil"	James Whitmore Jr.	Teleplay by : George Schenck & Frank Cardea; Story by : Dan E. Fesman	May 6, 2008	516	14.04
111	17	"About Face"	Dennis Smith	Teleplay by : Alfonso H. Moreno & Reed Steiner; Story by : Jesse Stern	May 13, 2008	517	14.88
112	18	"Judgment Day"	Thomas J. Wright	Steven D. Binder & David J. North	May 20, 2008	518	16.52
113	19	"Judgment Day"	Thomas J. Wright	Teleplay by : David J. North & Christopher J. Waild; Story by : Steven D. Binder	May 20, 2008	519	16.52

=== Season 6 (2008–09) ===
- Rocky Carroll (Leon Vance) was promoted to the main cast starting with the episode "Last Man Standing".
- "Legend" serves as the two-part backdoor pilot for the spin-off NCIS: Los Angeles.
- This is the longest season to have 25 episodes.

No. overall	No. in season	Title	Directed by	Written by	Original release date	Prod. code	U.S. viewers (millions)
114	1	"Last Man Standing"	Tony Wharmby	Shane Brennan	September 23, 2008	601	18.03
115	2	"Agent Afloat"	Thomas J. Wright	Dan E. Fesman & David J. North	September 30, 2008	602	17.47
116	3	"Capitol Offense"	Dennis Smith	George Schenck & Frank Cardea	October 7, 2008	603	16.29
117	4	"Heartland"	Tony Wharmby	Jesse Stern	October 14, 2008	604	18.04
118	5	"Nine Lives"	Dennis Smith	Linda Burstyn & Dan E. Fesman & David J. North	October 21, 2008	605	17.23
119	6	"Murder 2.0"	Arvin Brown	Steven D. Binder	October 28, 2008	606	17.26
120	7	"Collateral Damage"	Terrence O'Hara	Alfonso H. Moreno	November 11, 2008	607	18.75
121	8	"Cloak"	James Whitmore Jr.	Jesse Stern	November 18, 2008	608	18.00
122	9	"Dagger"	Dennis Smith	Reed Steiner & Christopher J. Waild	November 25, 2008	609	18.12
123	10	"Road Kill"	Thomas J. Wright	Steven Kriozere	December 2, 2008	610	18.52
124	11	"Silent Night"	Tony Wharmby	George Schenck & Frank Cardea	December 16, 2008	611	19.94
125	12	"Caged"	Leslie Libman	Alfonso H. Moreno	January 6, 2009	612	19.10
126	13	"Broken Bird"	James Whitmore Jr.	Jesse Stern	January 13, 2009	613	18.62
127	14	"Love & War"	Terrence O'Hara	Steven D. Binder & David J. North	January 27, 2009	614	19.20
128	15	"Deliverance"	Dennis Smith	Dan E. Fesman & Reed Steiner	February 10, 2009	615	18.03
129	16	"Bounce"	Arvin Brown	David J. North & Steven D. Binder	February 17, 2009	616	18.06
130	17	"South by Southwest"	Thomas J. Wright	George Schenck & Frank Cardea	February 24, 2009	617	18.27
131	18	"Knockout"	Tony Wharmby	Jesse Stern	March 17, 2009	618	15.84
132	19	"Hide and Seek"	Dennis Smith	Dan E. Fesman	March 24, 2009	619	17.83
133	20	"Dead Reckoning"	Terrence O'Hara	Teleplay by : Reed Steiner & Christopher J. Waild; Story by : David J. North	March 31, 2009	620	17.23
134	21	"Toxic"	Thomas J. Wright	Steven D. Binder	April 7, 2009	621	17.81
135	22	"Legend"	Tony Wharmby	Shane Brennan	April 28, 2009	622	16.70
136	23	"Legend"	James Whitmore Jr.	Shane Brennan	May 5, 2009	623	16.72
137	24	"Semper Fidelis"	Tony Wharmby	Jesse Stern	May 12, 2009	624	16.20
138	25	"Aliyah"	Dennis Smith	David J. North	May 19, 2009	625	16.51

=== Season 7 (2009–10) ===
No. overall	No. in season	Title	Directed by	Written by	Original release date	Prod. code	U.S. viewers (millions)
139	1	"Truth or Consequences"	Dennis Smith	Jesse Stern	September 22, 2009	701	20.60
140	2	"Reunion"	Tony Wharmby	Steven D. Binder	September 29, 2009	702	21.37
141	3	"The Inside Man"	Thomas J. Wright	George Schenck & Frank Cardea	October 6, 2009	703	20.70
142	4	"Good Cop, Bad Cop"	Leslie Libman	Teleplay by : Jesse Stern; Story by : David J. North	October 13, 2009	704	21.04
143	5	"Code of Conduct"	Terrence O'Hara	Teleplay by : Reed Steiner & Christopher J. Waild; Story by : Christopher J. Waild	October 20, 2009	705	21.25
144	6	"Outlaws and In-Laws"	Tony Wharmby	Jesse Stern	November 3, 2009	706	20.18
145	7	"Endgame"	James Whitmore Jr.	Gary Glasberg	November 10, 2009	707	20.96
146	8	"Power Down"	Thomas J. Wright	Steven D. Binder & David J. North	November 17, 2009	708	20.34
147	9	"Child's Play"	William Webb	Reed Steiner	November 24, 2009	709	20.35
148	10	"Faith"	Arvin Brown	Gary Glasberg	December 15, 2009	710	20.69
149	11	"Ignition"	Dennis Smith	Jesse Stern	January 5, 2010	711	21.37
150	12	"Flesh and Blood"	Arvin Brown	George Schenck & Frank Cardea	January 12, 2010	712	20.85
151	13	"Jet Lag"	Tony Wharmby	Christopher J. Waild	January 26, 2010	713	20.22
152	14	"Masquerade"	James Whitmore Jr.	Steven D. Binder	February 2, 2010	714	19.23
153	15	"Jack-Knife"	Dennis Smith	Jesse Stern	February 9, 2010	715	19.75
154	16	"Mother's Day"	Tony Wharmby	Gary Glasberg & Reed Steiner	March 2, 2010	716	19.62
155	17	"Double Identity"	Mark Horowitz	George Schenck & Frank Cardea	March 9, 2010	717	19.58
156	18	"Jurisdiction"	Terrence O'Hara	Lee David Zlotoff	March 16, 2010	718	18.00
157	19	"Guilty Pleasure"	James Whitmore Jr.	Reed Steiner & Christopher J. Waild	April 6, 2010	719	16.45
158	20	"Moonlighting"	Thomas J. Wright	Steven D. Binder & Jesse Stern	April 27, 2010	720	16.29
159	21	"Obsession"	Tony Wharmby	George Schenck & Frank Cardea	May 4, 2010	721	15.10
160	22	"Borderland"	Terrence O'Hara	Steven D. Binder	May 11, 2010	722	17.23
161	23	"Patriot Down"	Dennis Smith	Gary Glasberg	May 18, 2010	723	15.96
162	24	"Rule Fifty-One"	Dennis Smith	Jesse Stern	May 25, 2010	724	16.30

=== Season 8 (2010–11) ===
No. overall	No. in season	Title	Directed by	Written by	Original release date	Prod. code	U.S. viewers (millions)
163	1	"Spider and the Fly"	Dennis Smith	Gary Glasberg	September 21, 2010	801	19.41
164	2	"Worst Nightmare"	Tony Wharmby	Steven D. Binder	September 28, 2010	802	19.15
165	3	"Short Fuse"	Leslie Libman	George Schenck & Frank Cardea	October 5, 2010	803	19.81
166	4	"Royals and Loyals"	Arvin Brown	Reed Steiner	October 12, 2010	804	19.20
167	5	"Dead Air"	Terrence O'Hara	Christopher J. Waild	October 19, 2010	805	19.41
168	6	"Cracked"	Tony Wharmby	Nicole Mirante-Matthews	October 26, 2010	806	20.18
169	7	"Broken Arrow"	Arvin Brown	George Schenck & Frank Cardea	November 9, 2010	807	19.87
170	8	"Enemies Foreign"	Dennis Smith	Jesse Stern	November 16, 2010	808	19.43
171	9	"Enemies Domestic"	Mark Horowitz	Jesse Stern	November 23, 2010	809	18.78
172	10	"False Witness"	James Whitmore Jr.	Steven D. Binder	December 14, 2010	810	19.87
173	11	"Ships in the Night"	Thomas J. Wright	Reed Steiner & Christopher J. Waild	January 11, 2011	811	21.93
174	12	"Recruited"	Arvin Brown	Gary Glasberg	January 18, 2011	812	21.09
175	13	"Freedom"	Craig Ross Jr.	Nicole Mirante-Matthews	February 1, 2011	813	22.85
176	14	"A Man Walks Into a Bar…"	James Whitmore Jr.	Gary Glasberg	February 8, 2011	814	20.35
177	15	"Defiance"	Dennis Smith	George Schenck & Frank Cardea	February 15, 2011	815	19.40
178	16	"Kill Screen"	Tony Wharmby	Teleplay by : Steven D. Binder; Story by : Steven Kriozere	February 22, 2011	816	21.32
179	17	"One Last Score"	Michael Weatherly	Jesse Stern	March 1, 2011	817	19.21
180	18	"Out of the Frying Pan"	Terrence O'Hara	Teleplay by : Reed Steiner & Christopher J. Waild; Story by : Leon Carroll, Jr.	March 22, 2011	818	19.46
181	19	"Tell-All"	Kevin Rodney Sullivan	Andrew Bartels	March 29, 2011	819	18.73
182	20	"Two-Faced"	Thomas J. Wright	Nicole Mirante-Matthews & Reed Steiner	April 5, 2011	820	19.40
183	21	"Dead Reflection"	William Webb	George Schenck & Frank Cardea	April 12, 2011	821	19.87
184	22	"Baltimore"	Terrence O'Hara	Steven D. Binder	May 3, 2011	822	17.87
185	23	"Swan Song"	Tony Wharmby	Jesse Stern	May 10, 2011	823	17.62
186	24	"Pyramid"	Dennis Smith	Gary Glasberg	May 17, 2011	824	18.62

=== Season 9 (2011–12) ===
No. overall	No. in season	Title	Directed by	Written by	Original release date	Prod. code	U.S. viewers (millions)
187	1	"Nature of the Beast"	Tony Wharmby	Gary Glasberg	September 20, 2011	903	19.96
188	2	"Restless"	James Whitmore Jr.	Steven D. Binder	September 27, 2011	902	19.51
189	3	"The Penelope Papers"	Arvin Brown	Nicole Mirante-Matthews	October 4, 2011	901	19.35
190	4	"Enemy on the Hill"	Dennis Smith	George Schenck & Frank Cardea	October 11, 2011	904	18.98
191	5	"Safe Harbor"	Terrence O'Hara	Reed Steiner & Christopher J. Waild	October 18, 2011	905	19.41
192	6	"Thirst"	Thomas J. Wright	Scott Williams	October 25, 2011	906	19.43
193	7	"Devil's Triangle"	Leslie Libman	Steven D. Binder & Reed Steiner	November 1, 2011	907	19.71
194	8	"Engaged"	James Whitmore Jr.	Gina Lucita Monreal	November 8, 2011	908	20.38
195	9	"Engaged"	Tony Wharmby	Gary Glasberg	November 15, 2011	909	20.00
196	10	"Sins of the Father"	Arvin Brown	George Schenck & Frank Cardea	November 22, 2011	910	18.49
197	11	"Newborn King"	Dennis Smith	Christopher J. Waild	December 13, 2011	911	19.13
198	12	"Housekeeping"	Terrence O’Hara	Scott Williams	January 3, 2012	912	19.81
199	13	"A Desperate Man"	Leslie Libman	Nicole Mirante-Matthews	January 10, 2012	913	21.03
200	14	"Life Before His Eyes"	Tony Wharmby	Gary Glasberg	February 7, 2012	914	20.98
201	15	"Secrets"	Leslie Libman	Steven D. Binder	February 14, 2012	915	19.59
202	16	"Psych Out"	Dennis Smith	Teleplay by : Reed Steiner; Story by : Gary Glasberg & Reed Steiner	February 21, 2012	916	19.29
203	17	"Need to Know"	Michelle MacLaren	George Schenck & Frank Cardea	February 28, 2012	917	18.20
204	18	"The Tell"	Thomas J. Wright	Gina Lucita Monreal	March 20, 2012	918	19.05
205	19	"The Good Son"	Terrence O'Hara	Nicole Mirante-Matthews & Scott Williams	March 27, 2012	919	18.67
206	20	"The Missionary Position"	Arvin Brown	Allison Abner	April 10, 2012	920	17.66
207	21	"Rekindled"	Mark Horowitz	Christopher J. Waild & Reed Steiner	April 17, 2012	921	18.08
208	22	"Playing with Fire"	Dennis Smith	George Schenck & Frank Cardea	May 1, 2012	922	17.58
209	23	"Up in Smoke"	James Whitmore Jr.	Steven D. Binder	May 8, 2012	923	18.20
210	24	"Till Death Do Us Part"	Tony Wharmby	Gary Glasberg	May 15, 2012	924	19.05

=== Season 10 (2012–13) ===
- Brian Dietzen as M.E. Assistant (Jimmy Palmer) was promoted to the main cast as of this season.

No. overall	No. in season	Title	Directed by	Written by	Original release date	Prod. code	U.S. viewers (millions)
211	1	"Extreme Prejudice"	Tony Wharmby	Gary Glasberg	September 25, 2012	925	20.48
212	2	"Recovery"	Dennis Smith	Scott Williams	October 2, 2012	926	18.87
213	3	"Phoenix"	Terrence O'Hara	Steven D. Binder	October 9, 2012	927	18.51
214	4	"Lost at Sea"	Tony Wharmby	Christopher J. Waild	October 23, 2012	928	17.78
215	5	"The Namesake"	Arvin Brown	George Schenck & Frank Cardea	October 30, 2012	1001	18.83
216	6	"Shell Shock"	Leslie Libman	Nicole Mirante-Matthews	November 13, 2012	1002	17.05
217	7	"Shell Shock"	Thomas J. Wright	Gina Lucita Monreal	November 20, 2012	1003	16.47
218	8	"Gone"	James Whitmore Jr.	Teleplay by : Scott Williams; Story by : Reed Steiner	November 27, 2012	1004	19.76
219	9	"Devil's Trifecta"	Arvin Brown	Steven D. Binder	December 11, 2012	1005	17.65
220	10	"You Better Watch Out"	Tony Wharmby	George Schenck & Frank Cardea	December 18, 2012	1006	19.59
221	11	"Shabbat Shalom"	Dennis Smith	Christopher J. Waild	January 8, 2013	1007	21.11
222	12	"Shiva"	Arvin Brown	Teleplay by : Scott Williams; Story by : Christopher J. Waild & Gary Glasberg	January 15, 2013	1008	22.86
223	13	"Hit and Run"	Dennis Smith	Teleplay by : Gina Lucita Monreal; Story by : Gary Glasberg & Gina Lucita Monreal	January 29, 2013	1009	22.07
224	14	"Canary"	Terrence O'Hara	Christopher J. Waild	February 5, 2013	1010	21.79
225	15	"Hereafter"	Tony Wharmby	Nicole Mirante-Matthews	February 19, 2013	1011	21.08
226	16	"Detour"	Mario Van Peebles	Steven D. Binder	February 26, 2013	1012	20.69
227	17	"Prime Suspect"	James Whitmore Jr.	George Schenck & Frank Cardea	March 5, 2013	1013	20.81
228	18	"Seek"	Michael Weatherly	Scott Williams	March 19, 2013	1014	19.79
229	19	"Squall"	Thomas J. Wright	Bill Nuss	March 26, 2013	1015	18.62
230	20	"Chasing Ghosts"	Arvin Brown	Nicole Mirante-Matthews	April 9, 2013	1016	17.22
231	21	"Berlin"	Terrence O'Hara	Scott Williams & Gina Lucita Monreal	April 23, 2013	1017	17.33
232	22	"Revenge"	James Whitmore Jr.	George Schenck & Frank Cardea	April 30, 2013	1018	18.29
233	23	"Double Blind"	Dennis Smith	Christopher J. Waild & Steven D. Binder	May 7, 2013	1019	17.56
234	24	"Damned If You Do"	Tony Wharmby	Gary Glasberg	May 14, 2013	1020	18.79

=== Season 11 (2013–14) ===
- Cote de Pablo as Special Agent (Ziva David) departed the show after the second episode, "Past, Present, and Future".
- Emily Wickersham as NSA Analyst and then Probationary Special Agent, (Eleanor Bishop), is introduced in episode nine, "Gut Check", and was later promoted to the main cast in episode twelve, "Kill Chain".
- "Crescent City" serves as the two-part pilot for NCIS: New Orleans.

No. overall	No. in season	Title	Directed by	Written by	Original release date	Prod. code	U.S. viewers (millions)
235	1	"Whiskey Tango Foxtrot"	Tony Wharmby	Gary Glasberg	September 24, 2013	1101	20.02
236	2	"Past, Present, and Future"	James Whitmore Jr.	Teleplay by : Scott Williams & Gina Lucita Monreal; Story by : Gary Glasberg	October 1, 2013	1102	19.98
237	3	"Under the Radar"	Dennis Smith	George Schenck & Frank Cardea	October 8, 2013	1103	18.33
238	4	"Anonymous Was a Woman"	Terrence O'Hara	Steven D. Binder	October 15, 2013	1104	18.83
239	5	"Once a Crook"	Arvin Brown	Christopher Silber	October 22, 2013	1105	19.00
240	6	"Oil & Water"	Thomas J. Wright	Jennifer Corbett	October 29, 2013	1106	19.30
241	7	"Better Angels"	Tony Wharmby	Gina Lucita Monreal	November 5, 2013	1107	19.18
242	8	"Alibi"	Holly Dale	George Schenck & Frank Cardea	November 12, 2013	1108	19.37
243	9	"Gut Check"	Dennis Smith	Christopher J. Waild	November 19, 2013	1109	19.66
244	10	"Devil's Triad"	Arvin Brown	Steven D. Binder	December 10, 2013	1110	19.30
245	11	"Homesick"	Terrence O'Hara	Scott Williams	December 17, 2013	1111	19.65
246	12	"Kill Chain"	James Whitmore Jr.	Christopher Silber	January 7, 2014	1112	20.84
247	13	"Double Back"	Tony Wharmby	Gina Lucita Monreal	January 14, 2014	1113	19.72
248	14	"Monsters and Men"	Dennis Smith	Jennifer Corbett	February 4, 2014	1114	19.53
249	15	"Bulletproof"	Leslie Libman	Christopher J. Waild	February 25, 2014	1115	17.03
250	16	"Dressed to Kill"	Thomas J. Wright	George Schenck & Frank Cardea	March 4, 2014	1116	17.85
251	17	"Rock and a Hard Place"	Arvin Brown	Steven D. Binder	March 18, 2014	1117	17.11
252	18	"Crescent City"	James Whitmore Jr.	Gary Glasberg	March 25, 2014	1118	17.52
253	19	"Crescent City"	Tony Wharmby	Gary Glasberg	April 1, 2014	1119	17.16
254	20	"Page Not Found"	Terrence O'Hara	Christopher J. Waild	April 8, 2014	1120	17.39
255	21	"Alleged"	Arvin Brown	Scott Williams	April 15, 2014	1121	17.12
256	22	"Shooter"	Dennis Smith	George Schenck & Frank Cardea	April 29, 2014	1122	17.25
257	23	"The Admiral's Daughter"	James Whitmore Jr.	Christopher Silber & Steven D. Binder	May 6, 2014	1123	15.88
258	24	"Honor Thy Father"	Tony Wharmby	Gary Glasberg & Gina Lucita Monreal	May 13, 2014	1124	16.95

=== Season 12 (2014–15) ===
No. overall	No. in season	Title	Directed by	Written by	Original release date	Prod. code	U.S. viewers (millions)
259	1	"Twenty Klicks"	Tony Wharmby	Gary Glasberg & Scott Williams	September 23, 2014	1201	18.23
260	2	"Kill the Messenger"	Dennis Smith	George Schenck & Frank Cardea	September 30, 2014	1202	18.84
261	3	"So It Goes"	Leslie Libman	Steven D. Binder	October 7, 2014	1203	17.30
262	4	"Choke Hold"	Terrence O'Hara	Christopher J. Waild	October 14, 2014	1204	17.26
263	5	"The San Dominick"	Arvin Brown	Christopher Silber	October 21, 2014	1205	17.13
264	6	"Parental Guidance Suggested"	Thomas J. Wright	Jennifer Corbett	October 28, 2014	1206	17.53
265	7	"The Searchers"	Tony Wharmby	Gina Lucita Monreal	November 11, 2014	1207	17.49
266	8	"Semper Fortis"	Dennis Smith	Matthew R. Jarrett & Scott J. Jarrett	November 18, 2014	1208	18.10
267	9	"Grounded"	Bethany Rooney	Scott Williams	November 25, 2014	1209	16.01
268	10	"House Rules"	Terrence O'Hara	Christopher J. Waild	December 16, 2014	1210	17.53
269	11	"Check"	Alrick Riley	Steven D. Binder	January 6, 2015	1211	19.76
270	12	"The Enemy Within"	James Whitmore Jr.	George Schenck & Frank Cardea	January 13, 2015	1212	19.87
271	13	"We Build, We Fight"	Rocky Carroll	Jennifer Corbett	February 3, 2015	1213	18.64
272	14	"Cadence"	Tony Wharmby	Christopher Silber	February 10, 2015	1214	18.77
273	15	"Cabin Fever"	Bethany Rooney	Scott Williams	February 17, 2015	1215	18.06
274	16	"Blast from the Past"	Dennis Smith	David J. North	February 24, 2015	1216	17.38
275	17	"The Artful Dodger"	Terrence O'Hara	Gina Lucita Monreal	March 10, 2015	1217	16.22
276	18	"Status Update"	Holly Dale	Christopher J. Waild	March 24, 2015	1218	16.23
277	19	"Patience"	Thomas J. Wright	Steven D. Binder	March 31, 2015	1219	16.60
278	20	"No Good Deed"	Arvin Brown	George Schenck & Frank Cardea	April 7, 2015	1220	16.85
279	21	"Lost in Translation"	Tony Wharmby	Jennifer Corbett	April 14, 2015	1221	15.84
280	22	"Troll"	Dennis Smith	Scott Williams	April 28, 2015	1222	14.85
281	23	"The Lost Boys"	James Whitmore Jr.	Gina Lucita Monreal	May 5, 2015	1223	14.05
282	24	"Neverland"	Tony Wharmby	Gary Glasberg	May 12, 2015	1224	14.94

=== Season 13 (2015–16) ===
- Episode 12 begins a crossover event that concludes on NCIS: New Orleans season 2 episode 12.
- Michael Weatherly (Anthony DiNozzo) departed the series after the season finale "Family First".

No. overall	No. in season	Title	Directed by	Written by	Original release date	Prod. code	U.S. viewers (millions)
283	1	"Stop the Bleeding"	Tony Wharmby	Gary Glasberg & Scott Williams	September 22, 2015	1301	18.19
284	2	"Personal Day"	Terrence O'Hara	Gina Lucita Monreal	September 29, 2015	1302	16.53
285	3	"Incognito"	James Whitmore Jr.	George Schenck & Frank Cardea	October 6, 2015	1303	16.87
286	4	"Double Trouble"	Dennis Smith	Christopher J. Waild	October 13, 2015	1304	16.04
287	5	"Lockdown"	Bethany Rooney	Stephen D. Binder	October 20, 2015	1305	17.21
288	6	"Viral"	Rocky Carroll	Jennifer Corbett	October 27, 2015	1306	16.81
289	7	"16 Years"	Mark Horowitz	Brendan Fehily	November 3, 2015	1307	17.97
290	8	"Saviors"	Tony Wharmby	Scott Williams	November 10, 2015	1308	16.68
291	9	"Day In Court"	Dennis Smith	George Schenck & Frank Cardea	November 17, 2015	1309	16.59
292	10	"Blood Brothers"	Arvin Brown	Teleplay by : Jennifer Corbett; Story by : Gary Glasberg & Jennifer Corbett	November 24, 2015	1310	16.19
293	11	"Spinning Wheel"	Terrence O'Hara	Steven D. Binder	December 15, 2015	1311	15.53
294	12	"Sister City (Part I)"	Leslie Libman	Christopher J. Waild	January 5, 2016	1312	18.97
295	13	"Déjà Vu"	Rocky Carroll	Matthew R. Jarrett & Scott J. Jarrett	January 19, 2016	1313	17.51
296	14	"Decompressed"	Thomas J. Wright	Brendan Fehily	February 9, 2016	1314	16.94
297	15	"React"	Bethany Rooney	Jennifer Corbett	February 16, 2016	1315	17.34
298	16	"Loose Cannons"	Alrick Riley	Scott Williams	February 23, 2016	1316	17.47
299	17	"After Hours"	Terrence O'Hara	Cindi Hemingway	March 1, 2016	1317	15.44
300	18	"Scope"	Tony Wharmby	Gary Glasberg & Gina Lucita Monreal	March 15, 2016	1318	15.10
301	19	"Reasonable Doubts"	Thomas J. Wright	George Schenck & Frank Cardea	March 22, 2016	1319	15.90
302	20	"Charade"	Edward Ornelas	Brendan Fehily	April 5, 2016	1320	15.67
303	21	"Return to Sender"	Leslie Libman	Christopher J. Waild	April 19, 2016	1321	14.80
304	22	"Homefront"	Dennis Smith	Gina Lucita Monreal & Jennifer Corbett	May 3, 2016	1322	14.86
305	23	"Dead Letter"	James Whitmore Jr.	Steven D. Binder	May 10, 2016	1323	16.04
306	24	"Family First"	Tony Wharmby	Gary Glasberg & Scott Williams	May 17, 2016	1324	18.01

=== Season 14 (2016–17) ===
- The first season not to feature longtime cast member Michael Weatherly, who left the series after 13 seasons in the thirteenth season finale.
- Jennifer Esposito (Alexandra "Alex" Quinn) and Wilmer Valderrama (Nicholas "Nick" Torres) join the cast. Jennifer Esposito departed in the season finale.
- Duane Henry (MI6 Senior Officer Clayton Reeves) was promoted to the main cast in the fifth episode ("Philly").
- Pandora's Box (Part I) episode begins a crossover event that concludes in NCIS: New Orleans episode, Pandora's Box, Part II.

No. overall	No. in season	Title	Directed by	Written by	Original release date	Prod. code	U.S. viewers (millions)
307	1	"Rogue"	Tony Wharmby	Gary Glasberg & Jennifer Corbett	September 20, 2016	1401	16.00
308	2	"Being Bad"	James Whitmore Jr.	Steven D. Binder	September 27, 2016	1402	15.52
309	3	"Privileged Information"	Edward Ornelas	George Schenck & Frank Cardea	October 4, 2016	1403	14.44
310	4	"Love Boat"	Terrence O'Hara	Christopher J. Waild	October 11, 2016	1404	14.77
311	5	"Philly"	Allan Arkush	Scott Williams	October 18, 2016	1405	14.76
312	6	"Shell Game"	Thomas J. Wright	Brendan Fehily	October 25, 2016	1406	14.08
313	7	"Home of the Brave"	Alrick Riley	Gina Lucita Monreal	November 15, 2016	1407	14.73
314	8	"Enemy Combatant"	Tony Wharmby	Jennifer Corbett	November 22, 2016	1409	14.86
315	9	"Pay to Play"	Arvin Brown	Cindi Hemingway	December 6, 2016	1408	14.64
316	10	"The Tie That Binds"	Arvin Brown	Steven D. Binder	December 13, 2016	1411	14.74
317	11	"Willoughby"	Tony Wharmby	Gina Lucita Monreal	January 3, 2017	1412	15.79
318	12	"Off the Grid"	Rocky Carroll	George Schenck & Frank Cardea	January 17, 2017	1413	15.49
319	13	"Keep Going"	Terrence O'Hara	Teleplay by : Scott Williams; Story by : Matthew R. Jarrett & Scott J. Jarrett	January 24, 2017	1410	16.21
320	14	"Nonstop"	Mark Horowitz	Brendan Fehily	February 7, 2017	1414	15.57
321	15	"Pandora's Box (Part I)"	Alrick Riley	Christopher J. Waild	February 14, 2017	1416	15.29
322	16	"A Many Splendored Thing"	Michael Zinberg	David J. North & Steven D. Binder	February 21, 2017	1415	14.87
323	17	"What Lies Above"	Leslie Libman	Scott Williams	March 7, 2017	1417	14.17
324	18	"M.I.A."	Thomas J. Wright	Jennifer Corbett	March 14, 2017	1418	14.16
325	19	"The Wall"	Bethany Rooney	Gina Lucita Monreal	March 28, 2017	1419	14.35
326	20	"A Bowl of Cherries"	Edward Ornelas	Brendan Fehily	April 4, 2017	1420	13.83
327	21	"One Book, Two Covers"	Terrence O'Hara	David J. North	April 18, 2017	1421	13.32
328	22	"Beastmaster"	Bethany Rooney	Christopher J. Waild	May 2, 2017	1422	12.88
329	23	"Something Blue"	James Whitmore Jr.	Jennifer Corbett & Scott Williams	May 9, 2017	1423	13.39
330	24	"Rendezvous"	Tony Wharmby	George Schenck & Frank Cardea & Steven D. Binder	May 16, 2017	1424	13.33

=== Season 15 (2017–18) ===
- Maria Bello (Jacqueline Sloane) made her series debut in episode 4, "Skeleton Crew", before her promotion to sries regular in episode 5, "Fake It 'Til You Make It".
- Pauley Perrette (Abby Sciuto) and Duane Henry (Clayton Reeves) departed the show in episode 22, "Two Steps Back".

No. overall	No. in season	Title	Directed by	Written by	Original release date	Prod. code	U.S. viewers (millions)
331	1	"House Divided"	Tony Wharmby	Steven D. Binder	September 26, 2017	1501	13.29
332	2	"Twofer"	James Whitmore Jr.	Scott Williams	October 3, 2017	1502	13.50
333	3	"Exit Strategy"	Terrence O'Hara	Christopher J. Waild	October 10, 2017	1503	13.60
334	4	"Skeleton Crew"	Rocky Carroll	Jennifer Corbett	October 17, 2017	1504	12.85
335	5	"Fake It 'Til You Make It"	Thomas J. Wright	David J. North	October 24, 2017	1506	13.30
336	6	"Trapped"	Bethany Rooney	Brendan Fehily	October 31, 2017	1505	12.11
337	7	"Burden of Proof"	Dennis Smith	Gina Lucita Monreal	November 7, 2017	1507	13.47
338	8	"Voices"	Tony Wharmby	Steven D. Binder	November 14, 2017	1508	13.08
339	9	"Ready or Not"	Terrence O'Hara	Scott Williams	November 21, 2017	1509	12.54
340	10	"Double Down"	Alrick Riley	Christopher J. Waild	December 12, 2017	1510	12.58
341	11	"High Tide"	Tony Wharmby	David J. North & Steven D. Binder	January 2, 2018	1512	14.10
342	12	"Dark Secrets"	Bethany Rooney	George Schenck & Frank Cardea	January 9, 2018	1511	14.24
343	13	"Family Ties"	Rocky Carroll	Brendan Fehily	January 23, 2018	1513	13.97
344	14	"Keep Your Friends Close"	Mark Horowitz	Gina Lucita Monreal	February 6, 2018	1514	13.90
345	15	"Keep Your Enemies Closer"	Thomas J. Wright	Jennifer Corbett	February 27, 2018	1515	12.45
346	16	"Handle with Care"	Alrick Riley	Scott J. Jarrett & Matthew R. Jarrett	March 6, 2018	1516	12.92
347	17	"One Man's Trash"	Michael Zinberg	Scott Williams	March 13, 2018	1517	13.26
348	18	"Death from Above"	Rocky Carroll	Christopher J. Waild	March 27, 2018	1518	11.94
349	19	"The Numerical Limit"	Leslie Libman	David J. North & Steven D. Binder	April 3, 2018	1519	12.23
350	20	"Sight Unseen"	Bethany Rooney	Brendan Fehily	April 17, 2018	1520	11.58
351	21	"One Step Forward"	James Whitmore Jr.	Gina Lucita Monreal	May 1, 2018	1521	12.35
352	22	"Two Steps Back"	Michael Zinberg	Jennifer Corbett	May 8, 2018	1522	15.08
353	23	"Fallout"	Terrence O'Hara	Teleplay by : David J. North & Christopher J. Waild; Story by : Christopher J. Waild	May 15, 2018	1523	12.71
354	24	"Date with Destiny"	Tony Wharmby	Scott Williams & George Schenck & Frank Cardea	May 22, 2018	1524	12.07

=== Season 16 (2018–19) ===
- Diona Reasonover (Kasie Hines) was promoted to the main cast.
- Cote de Pablo (Ziva David) made a guest appearance in the season finale.
- This is the final season to have 24 episodes.

No. overall	No. in season	Title	Directed by	Written by	Original release date	Prod. code	U.S. viewers (millions)
355	1	"Destiny's Child"	Tony Wharmby	Steven D. Binder	September 25, 2018	1601	12.56
356	2	"Love Thy Neighbor"	Terrence O'Hara	Scott Williams	October 2, 2018	1602	12.13
357	3	"Boom"	Leslie Libman	Brendan Fehily	October 9, 2018	1604	12.36
358	4	"Third Wheel"	James Whitmore Jr.	Christopher J. Waild	October 16, 2018	1603	11.87
359	5	"Fragments"	Michael Zinberg	Gina Lucita Monreal	October 23, 2018	1605	11.26
360	6	"Beneath the Surface"	Rocky Carroll	Scott J. Jarrett & Matthew R. Jarrett	October 30, 2018	1606	12.32
361	7	"A Thousand Words"	Alrick Riley	David J. North	November 13, 2018	1607	12.47
362	8	"Friendly Fire"	Thomas J. Wright	Jennifer Corbett	November 20, 2018	1608	11.95
363	9	"Tailing Angie"	Terrence O'Hara	George Schenck	December 4, 2018	1609	12.04
364	10	"What Child Is This?"	Michael Zinberg	Scott Williams	December 11, 2018	1610	12.28
365	11	"Toil and Trouble"	Leslie Libman	Christopher J. Waild	January 8, 2019	1611	12.08
366	12	"The Last Link"	Rocky Carroll	Brendan Fehily	January 15, 2019	1612	12.21
367	13	"She"	Mark Horowitz	Gina Lucita Monreal	February 12, 2019	1614	13.37
368	14	"Once Upon a Tim"	Tony Wharmby	David J. North & Steven D. Binder	February 19, 2019	1613	12.74
369	15	"Crossing the Line"	Michael Zinberg	Jennifer Corbett	February 26, 2019	1615	11.77
370	16	"Bears and Cubs"	Diana Valentine	Scott Williams	March 12, 2019	1616	12.08
371	17	"Silent Service"	Rocky Carroll	Scott J. Jarrett & Matthew R. Jarrett	March 26, 2019	1617	12.18
372	18	"Mona Lisa"	Alrick Riley	David J. North & Brendan Fehily	April 2, 2019	1618	11.89
373	19	"Perennial"	Tony Wharmby	Gina Lucita Monreal	April 9, 2019	1619	11.82
374	20	"Hail & Farewell"	Michael Zinberg	Jennifer Corbett	April 16, 2019	1620	11.88
375	21	"Judge, Jury..."	James Whitmore Jr.	Christopher J. Waild	April 30, 2019	1621	11.80
376	22	"...and Executioner"	Terrence O'Hara	Christopher J. Waild & David J. North	May 7, 2019	1622	11.66
377	23	"Lost Time"	Diana Valentine	Teleplay by : Scott Williams; Story by : Scott Williams & Frank Cardea	May 14, 2019	1623	11.70
378	24	"Daughters"	Tony Wharmby	Steven D. Binder	May 21, 2019	1624	12.10

=== Season 17 (2019–20) ===
- Cote de Pablo (Ziva David) had a recurring role in the season.
- On March 13, 2020, CBS announced that the filming of season 17 had been suspended due to the COVID-19 pandemic resulting in only 20 episodes being filmed.

No. overall	No. in season	Title	Directed by	Written by	Original release date	Prod. code	U.S. viewers (millions)
379	1	"Out of the Darkness"	Terrence O'Hara	Gina Lucita Monreal	September 24, 2019	1701	12.57
380	2	"Into the Light"	Tony Wharmby	Steven D. Binder	October 1, 2019	1702	12.51
381	3	"Going Mobile"	Thomas J. Wright	Scott Williams	October 8, 2019	1703	11.19
382	4	"Someone Else's Shoes"	Michael Zinberg	Christopher J. Waild	October 15, 2019	1704	10.87
383	5	"Wide Awake"	Diana Valentine	Brendan Fehily	October 22, 2019	1705	11.34
384	6	"Institutionalized"	Tony Wharmby	David J. North	November 5, 2019	1706	10.88
385	7	"No Vacancy"	Rocky Carroll	Marco Schnabel	November 12, 2019	1707	11.65
386	8	"Musical Chairs"	Michael Zinberg	Kate Torgovnick May	November 19, 2019	1708	11.12
387	9	"IRL"	Terrence O'Hara	Christopher J. Waild	November 26, 2019	1709	11.06
388	10	"The North Pole"	James Whitmore Jr.	Gina Lucita Monreal	December 17, 2019	1710	11.10
389	11	"In the Wind"	Rocky Carroll	Scott Williams	January 7, 2020	1711	10.39
390	12	"Flight Plan"	Tawnia McKiernan	Brendan Fehily	January 14, 2020	1712	10.12
391	13	"Sound Off"	William Webb	Lisa Di Trolio	January 21, 2020	1713	11.36
392	14	"On Fire"	Mark Horowitz	David J. North & Steven D. Binder	January 28, 2020	1714	12.12
393	15	"Lonely Hearts"	Michael Zinberg	Marco Schnabel	February 11, 2020	1715	11.75
394	16	"Ephemera"	Diana Valentine	Christopher J. Waild	February 18, 2020	1716	11.91
395	17	"In a Nutshell"	Michael Zinberg	Katie White	March 10, 2020	1717	10.75
396	18	"Schooled"	Alrick Riley	Kate Torgovnick May & Steven D. Binder	March 24, 2020	1718	13.22
397	19	"Blarney"	Rocky Carroll	Scott Williams	March 31, 2020	1719	13.65
398	20	"The Arizona"	James Whitmore Jr.	Gina Lucita Monreal	April 14, 2020	1720	13.49

=== Season 18 (2020–21) ===
- Maria Bello (Jacqueline Sloane) departed the show in episode 8 "True Believer".
- Emily Wickersham (Eleanor Bishop) departed the show after the season finale "Rule 91".

No. overall	No. in season	Title	Directed by	Written by	Original release date	Prod. code	U.S. viewers (millions)
399	1	"Sturgeon Season"	Michael Zinberg	Scott Williams	November 17, 2020	1801	10.35
400	2	"Everything Starts Somewhere"	Terrence O'Hara	Steven D. Binder	November 24, 2020	1802	10.15
401	3	"Blood and Treasure"	Diana Valentine	Christopher J. Waild	December 8, 2020	1803	8.53
402	4	"Sunburn"	Rocky Carroll	Marco Schnabel	January 19, 2021	1804	9.63
403	5	"Head of the Snake"	Tawnia McKiernan	Brendan Fehily & David J. North	January 19, 2021	1805	8.74
404	6	"1mm"	Diana Valentine	Gina Lucita Monreal	January 26, 2021	1806	10.02
405	7	"The First Day"	James Whitmore Jr.	Margaret Rose Lester	February 9, 2021	1807	9.74
406	8	"True Believer"	Terrence O'Hara	Jill Weinberger	March 2, 2021	1808	9.60
407	9	"Winter Chill"	Michael Zinberg	Scott Williams	March 9, 2021	1809	9.77
408	10	"Watchdog"	Diana Valentine	Brendan Fehily & David J. North	March 16, 2021	1810	9.98
409	11	"Gut Punch"	Rocky Carroll	Christopher J. Waild	April 6, 2021	1811	10.26
410	12	"Sangre"	James Whitmore Jr.	Marco Schnabel	April 27, 2021	1812	8.56
411	13	"Misconduct"	Tawnia McKiernan	Brendan Fehily & Margaret Rose Lester & David J. North	May 4, 2021	1813	9.70
412	14	"Unseen Improvements"	Diana Valentine	Steven D. Binder & Scott Williams	May 11, 2021	1814	8.94
413	15	"Blown Away"	Michael Zinberg	Marco Schnabel & Christopher J. Waild	May 18, 2021	1815	8.73
414	16	"Rule 91"	Diana Valentine	Brendan Fehily & David J. North	May 25, 2021	1816	8.96

=== Season 19 (2021–22) ===
- Katrina Law (Jessica Knight) was promoted to the main cast.
- Gary Cole (Alden Parker) makes his debut in episode 2 and joins the main cast in episode 3.
- Mark Harmon (Leroy Jethro Gibbs) departed the show in episode 4 "Great Wide Open", but remains on the title sequence for the remainder of the season.
- Episode 17 begins a crossover event that concludes on NCIS: Hawaiʻi season 1 episode 18.

No. overall	No. in season	Title	Directed by	Written by	Original release date	Prod. code	U.S. viewers (millions)
415	1	"Blood in the Water"	Michael Zinberg	Christopher J. Waild	September 20, 2021	1901	8.46
416	2	"Nearly Departed"	Terrence O'Hara	Scott Williams	September 27, 2021	1902	8.06
417	3	"Road to Nowhere"	Rocky Carroll	Marco Schnabel	October 4, 2021	1903	7.97
418	4	"Great Wide Open"	Terrence O'Hara	Brendan Fehily & David J. North	October 11, 2021	1904	7.66
419	5	"Face the Strange"	Diana Valentine	Steven D. Binder	October 18, 2021	1905	7.65
420	6	"False Start"	James Whitmore Jr.	Katherine Beattie & Christopher J. Waild	November 1, 2021	1906	7.28
421	7	"Docked"	Michael Zinberg	Marco Schnabel & Yasemin Yilmaz	November 8, 2021	1908	7.32
422	8	"Peacekeeper"	Rocky Carroll	Margaret Rose Lester & Scott Williams	November 29, 2021	1907	7.34
423	9	"Collective Memory"	Leslie Libman	Kimberly-Rose Wolter & David J. North	December 6, 2021	1909	7.25
424	10	"Pledge of Allegiance"	Rocky Carroll	Brendan Fehily	January 3, 2022	1910	6.94
425	11	"All Hands"	Martha Mitchell	Christopher J. Waild	January 17, 2022	1911	7.26
426	12	"Fight or Flight"	James Whitmore Jr.	Katherine Beattie	January 24, 2022	1912	7.79
427	13	"The Helpers"	Diana Valentine	Brian Dietzen & Scott Williams	February 28, 2022	1913	7.12
428	14	"First Steps"	Michael Zinberg	Yasemin Yilmaz	March 7, 2022	1914	7.43
429	15	"Thick as Thieves"	Terrence O'Hara	Marco Schnabel	March 14, 2022	1915	7.55
430	16	"The Wake"	Rocky Carroll	Katie White	March 21, 2022	1916	6.66
431	17	"Starting Over"	Michael Zinberg	Margaret Rose Lester & Scott Williams	March 28, 2022	1917	6.83
432	18	"Last Dance"	Terrence O'Hara	Brendan Fehily & David J. North	April 18, 2022	1918	6.34
433	19	"The Brat Pack"	Michael Zinberg	Katherine Beattie & Kimberly-Rose Wolter	May 2, 2022	1919	7.27
434	20	"All or Nothing"	Tawnia McKiernan	Story by : Marco Schnabel & Yasemin Yilmaz; Teleplay by : Yasemin Yilmaz	May 16, 2022	1920	6.51
435	21	"Birds of a Feather"	Terrence O'Hara	Christopher J. Waild	May 23, 2022	1921	7.47

=== Season 20 (2022–23) ===
- Episode 1 begins a crossover event that concludes on NCIS: Hawaiʻi season 2 episode 1.
- Episode 10 begins a crossover event that continues on NCIS: Hawaiʻi season 2 episode 10 and concludes on NCIS: Los Angeles season 14 episode 10.
- David McCallum (Donald Mallard) made his final appearance in the season finale "Black Sky" before his death.

No. overall	No. in season	Title	Directed by	Written by	Original release date	Prod. code	U.S. viewers (millions)
436	1	"A Family Matter"	Tawnia McKiernan	Scott Williams	September 19, 2022	2001	5.82
437	2	"Daddy Issues"	Michael Zinberg	Christopher J. Waild	September 26, 2022	2002	6.11
438	3	"Unearth"	Diana Valentine	Yasemin Yilmaz	October 3, 2022	2003	6.92
439	4	"Leave No Trace"	William Webb	Chad Gomez Creasey	October 10, 2022	2004	6.60
440	5	"Guardian"	James Whitmore Jr.	Marco Schnabel	October 17, 2022	2005	6.91
441	6	"The Good Fighter"	José Clemente Hernandez	Kimberly-Rose Wolter	October 24, 2022	2006	6.97
442	7	"Love Lost"	Rocky Carroll	Brendan Fehily & David J. North	November 14, 2022	2007	6.44
443	8	"Turkey Trot"	Lionel Coleman	Diona Reasonover & Scott Williams	November 21, 2022	2008	6.79
444	9	"Higher Education"	Claudia Yarmy	Katherine Beattie	December 5, 2022	2009	6.43
445	10	"Too Many Cooks"	Michael Zinberg	Christopher J. Waild	January 9, 2023	2010	7.93
446	11	"Bridges"	Lionel Coleman	Chad Gomez Creasey	January 16, 2023	2011	6.16
447	12	"Big Rig"	Rocky Carroll	Marco Schnabel	January 23, 2023	2012	7.54
448	13	"Evil Eye"	Michael Zinberg	Brendan Fehily & Kimberly-Rose Wolter	February 6, 2023	2013	7.15
449	14	"Old Wounds"	Diana Valentine	Brian Dietzen & Scott Williams	February 13, 2023	2014	7.05
450	15	"Unusual Suspects"	James Whitmore Jr.	Katherine Beattie	February 27, 2023	2015	7.01
451	16	"Butterfly Effect"	Tawnia McKiernan	Christopher J. Waild	March 13, 2023	2016	7.19
452	17	"Stranger in a Strange Land"	James Whitmore Jr.	Chad Gomez Creasey	March 20, 2023	2017	6.60
453	18	"Head Games"	Michael Zinberg	Sydney Mitchel	April 10, 2023	2018	6.84
454	19	"In the Spotlight"	Rocky Carroll	Yasemin Yilmaz	May 1, 2023	2019	6.81
455	20	"Second Opinion"	Tawnia McKiernan	Marco Schnabel	May 8, 2023	2020	6.64
456	21	"Kompromat"	Lionel Coleman	Scott Williams	May 15, 2023	2021	6.66
457	22	"Black Sky"	Diana Valentine	Brendan Fehily & David J. North	May 22, 2023	2022	6.73

=== Season 21 (2024) ===
- This is the first season to not feature David McCallum as Ducky Mallard as McCallum died around a week before this season entered production. "The Stories We Leave Behind" paid tribute to him and is dedicated to him.
- Michael Weatherly (Anthony DiNozzo) returned as a special guest star in the episode "The Stories We Leave Behind," making this his first appearance on the show after his exit in the season 13 finale ("Family First").
- This is the second season with less episodes than planned, this time due to the 2023 Writers Guild of America strike, which is the same type of strike that caused season 5 to consist of only 19 episodes

No. overall	No. in season	Title	Directed by	Written by	Original release date	Prod. code	U.S. viewers (millions)
458	1	"Algún Día"	Diana Valentine	Christopher J. Waild	February 12, 2024	2101	7.32
459	2	"The Stories We Leave Behind"	Michael Zinberg	Brian Dietzen & Scott Williams	February 19, 2024	2102	7.43
460	3	"Lifeline"	Rocky Carroll	Marco Schnabel	February 26, 2024	2103	7.00
461	4	"Left Unsaid"	Daniela Ruah	Yasemin Yilmaz	March 4, 2024	2104	6.91
462	5	"The Plan"	Lionel Coleman	Katherine Beattie & Chad Gomez Creasey	March 25, 2024	2105	6.15
463	6	"Strange Invaders"	Claudia Yarmy	Gina Gold & Aurorae Khoo & Steven D. Binder	April 1, 2024	2106	5.90
464	7	"A Thousand Yards"	Diana Valentine	Christopher J. Waild	April 15, 2024	2107	6.70
465	8	"Heartless"	Michael Zinberg	Sydney Mitchel & Brendan Fehily	April 22, 2024	2108	6.29
466	9	"Prime Cut"	Diana Valentine	Teleplay by : Marco Schnabel; Story by : Chad Gomez Creasey & Marco Schnabel	April 29, 2024	2109	6.66
467	10	"Reef Madness"	José Clemente Hernandez	Scott Williams	May 6, 2024	2110	6.84

=== Season 22 (2024–25) ===
No. overall	No. in season	Title	Directed by	Written by	Original release date	Prod. code	U.S. viewers (millions)
468	1	"Empty Nest"	Diana Valentine	Christopher J. Waild	October 14, 2024	2201	6.42
469	2	"Foreign Bodies"	Lionel Coleman	Marco Schnabel	October 21, 2024	2202	5.37
470	3	"The Trouble with Hal"	Michael Zinberg	Scott Williams	October 28, 2024	2203	4.92
471	4	"Sticks & Stones"	James Whitmore Jr.	Steven D. Binder	November 4, 2024	2204	4.76
472	5	"In from the Cold"	Tawnia McKiernan	Matthew Lau	November 11, 2024	2205	5.26
473	6	"Knight and Day"	Rocky Carroll	Amy Rutberg	November 25, 2024	2206	4.92
474	7	"Hardboiled"	José Clemente Hernandez	Andrew Bartels	December 2, 2024	2207	5.62
475	8	"Out of Control"	Diana Valentine	Steven D. Binder & Scott Williams	December 9, 2024	2208	4.89
476	9	"Humbug"	Lionel Coleman	Christopher J. Waild	December 16, 2024	2209	4.92
477	10	"Baker's Man"	Rocky Carroll	Andrew Bartels	January 27, 2025	2210	5.71
478	11	"For Better or Worse"	Michael Zinberg	Marco Schnabel	February 3, 2025	2211	5.34
479	12	"Fun and Games"	James Whitmore Jr.	Teleplay by : Matthew Lau & Steven D. Binder; Story by : Matthew Lau	February 10, 2025	2212	5.39
480	13	"Bad Blood"	José Clemente Hernandez	Sydney Mitchel	February 24, 2025	2213	5.36
481	14	"Close to Home"	Tawnia McKiernan	Amy Rutberg	March 3, 2025	2214	5.22
482	15	"Moonlit"	Marc Roskin	Scott Williams	March 24, 2025	2215	5.42
483	16	"Ladies' Night"	Rocky Carroll	Sydney Mitchel	March 31, 2025	2216	5.28
484	17	"Killer Instinct"	Lionel Coleman	Andrew Bartels	April 14, 2025	2217	5.07
485	18	"After the Storm"	Diana Valentine	Matthew Lau & Sydney Mitchel	April 21, 2025	2218	5.80
486	19	"Irreconcilable Differences"	Michael Zinberg	Christopher J. Waild	April 28, 2025	2219	5.50
487	20	"Nexus"	José Clemente Hernandez	Marco Schnabel	May 5, 2025	2220	5.59

=== Season 23 (2025–26) ===
- Emily Wickersham (Eleanor Bishop) returns as a guest this season.
- Rocky Carroll (Leon Vance) departed the series in the thirteenth episode "All Good Things".

No. overall	No. in season	Title	Directed by	Written by	Original release date	Prod. code	U.S. viewers (millions)
488	1	"Prodigal Son"	Diana Valentine	Christopher J. Waild	October 14, 2025	2301	5.33
489	2	"Prodigal Son"	James Whitmore Jr.	Christopher J. Waild	October 21, 2025	2302	5.79
490	3	"The Sound and the Fury"	Tawnia McKiernan	Scott Williams	October 28, 2025	2303	5.37
491	4	"Gone Girls"	Rocky Carroll	Amy Rutberg	November 4, 2025	2304	5.45
492	5	"Now and Then"	José Clemente Hernandez	Marco Schnabel	November 11, 2025	2305	5.63
493	6	"Page-Turner"	Marc Roskin	Sydney Mitchel & Steven D. Binder	November 18, 2025	2306	5.56
494	7	"God Only Knows"	Lee Friedlander	Andrew Bartels	December 2, 2025	2307	6.06
495	8	"Stolen Moments"	Diana Valentine	Brian Dietzen & Jesse Stern	December 9, 2025	2308	5.89
496	9	"Heaven and Nature"	James Whitmore Jr.	Scott Williams	December 16, 2025	2309	5.57
497	10	"Her"	Rocky Carroll	Christopher J. Waild	March 3, 2026	2310	5.31
498	11	"Army of One"	Tawnia McKiernan	Amy Rutberg	March 10, 2026	2311	4.89
499	12	"In Too Deep"	Michael Zinberg	Marco Schnabel	March 17, 2026	2312	4.95
500	13	"All Good Things"	José Clemente Hernandez	Steven D. Binder	March 24, 2026	2313	5.55
501	14	"Fleeting"	Marc Roskin	Andrew Bartels	March 31, 2026	2314	5.04
502	15	"Knick-Knack"	Kevin Berlandi	Christopher J. Waild	April 7, 2026	2315	5.00
503	16	"S.O.S."	Rocky Carroll	Sydney Mitchel & Amy Rutberg	April 14, 2026	2316	4.91
504	17	"Reboot"	Lionel Coleman	Scott Williams	April 21, 2026	2317	5.24
505	18	"Bad Impressions"	James Whitmore Jr.	Marco Schnabel	April 28, 2026	2318	5.13
506	19	"Deal with the Devil"	Diana Valentine	Andrew Bartels	May 5, 2026	2319	5.35
507	20	"Sons and Daughters"	José Clemente Hernandez	Christopher J. Waild	May 12, 2026	2320	5.44

=== Season 24 (2026–27) ===
- Michael Weatherly (Anthony DiNozzo) rejoins the main cast as of this season.

No. overall	No. in season	Title	Directed by	Written by	Original release date	Prod. code	U.S. viewers (millions)
508	1	"Wayward Son"	Diana Valentine	Steven D. Binder & Christopher J. Waild	October 6, 2026	2401	6.45
509	2	"Clean Slate"	Marc Roskin	Steven D. Binder & Christopher J. Waild	October 13, 2026	2402	5.92
510	3	"Sleeping Dogs"	José Clemente Hernandez	Marco Schnabel	October 20, 2026	2403	6.20
511	4	"Like and Subscribe"	Tawnia McKiernan	Sydney Mitchel & Amy Rutberg	October 27, 2026	2404	5.98
512	5	"Speechless"	Marc Roskin	Scott Williams	November 10, 2026	2405	6.10
513	6	"Ride or Die"	James Whitmore Jr.	Andrew Bartels	November 17, 2026	2406	TBD
514	7	"Lucky Shot"	Michael Zinberg	Marco Schnabel & Rob Wright	December 1, 2026	2407	TBD
515	8	"The Chair"	Lee Friedlander	Christopher J. Waild	December 8, 2026	2408	TBD

== Home media ==
Season	Episodes	DVD release dates			
Season	Episodes	Region 1	Region 2	Region 4	Discs
Intro	2	March 17, 2009	June 21, 2010	August 5, 2010	5
1	23	June 6, 2006	July 24, 2006	August 10, 2006	6
2	23	November 14, 2006	October 16, 2006	October 12, 2006	6
3	24	April 24, 2007	June 18, 2007	March 15, 2007	6
4	24	October 23, 2007	May 19, 2008	July 10, 2008	6
5	19	August 26, 2008	June 22, 2009	May 7, 2009	5
6	25	August 25, 2009	July 19, 2010	June 3, 2010	6
7	24	August 24, 2010	June 13, 2011	July 7, 2011	6
8	24	August 23, 2011	July 30, 2012	September 1, 2011	6
9	24	August 21, 2012	June 24, 2013	August 1, 2012	6
10	24	August 20, 2013	August 18, 2014	August 21, 2013	6
11	24	August 19, 2014	November 30, 2015	August 20, 2014	6
12	24	August 18, 2015	October 24, 2016	August 26, 2015	6
13	24	August 23, 2016	January 12, 2017	September 29, 2016	6
14	24	August 29, 2017	February 1, 2018	August 30, 2017	6
15	24	August 21, 2018	February 14, 2019	August 15, 2018	6
16	24	September 3, 2019	February 6, 2020	August 28, 2019	6
17	20	July 28, 2020	March 4, 2021	August 12, 2020	5
18	16	August 17, 2021	March 24, 2022	September 1, 2021	4
19	21	August 16, 2022	February 9, 2023	October 12, 2022	5
20	22	August 22, 2023	TBA	TBA	6
21	10	August 13, 2024	TBA	TBA	3
22	20	September 9, 2025	TBA	TBA	5
23	20	September 22, 2026	TBA	TBA	5

== See also ==
- NCIS (franchise)
- List of JAG episodes
- List of Hawaii Five-0 episodes
- List of NCIS: Los Angeles episodes
- List of NCIS: New Orleans episodes
- List of NCIS: Hawaiʻi episodes
- List of NCIS: Sydney episodes
- List of NCIS: Origins episodes
