= Rick Peters =

American actor

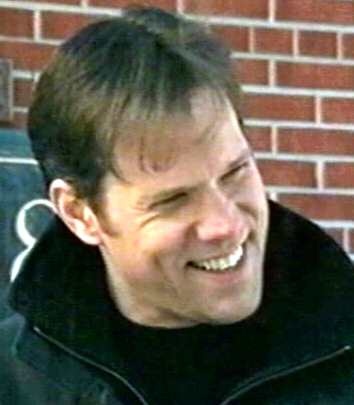
- Occupation: Actor
- Years active: 1992–present

Rick Peters is an American actor. He has appeared in several films and numerous television shows, and is perhaps best known for his role as Bobby Manning in Sue Thomas: F.B.Eye. He also plays the role of Elliot Larson in the 4th season of Dexter.

== Selected filmography ==
=== Film ===
Year	Title	Role	Notes
1994	Night of the Demons 2	Rick	
1997	Leprechaun 4: In Space	Private 'Mooch'	
1997	The Disappearance of Kevin Johnson	Willis Stevens	
1997	Elvis Meets Nixon	Elvis Presley	
1998	This Matter of Marriage	Steve	
2000	Gun Shy	Bennett	
2001	Night Class	Jake Franklin	
2006	The Craving Heart	Lou	

=== Television ===
Year	Title	Role	Notes
1993	Against the Grain	Bobby Taylor	Series regular
1994	McKenna	Dale Goodwin	Series regular
1994	Full House	Roger	Episode: "A Date with Fate"
1997	Pensacola: Wings of Gold	Craig	Recurring
1999	Happy Face Murders	Billy Lee	Television film
1999–2000	The Hoop Life	Greg Marr	Series regular
2000	The Pretender	Garrett Mohr	Episode: "Junk"
2001	Providence	Mitch	Recurring
2001	CSI: Crime Scene Investigation	Jerry Walden	Episode: "Scuba Doobie-Doo"
2002	Sue Thomas: F.B.Eye	Bobby Manning	56 episodes
2002	Smallville	Bob Rickman	Episode: "Hug"
2002	Andy Richter Controls the Universe	Milo	Episode: "The Show Might Go On"
2005	CSI: Miami	Robert Smith	Episode: "Killer Date"
2005	Close to Home	Curt	Episode: "Pilot"
2005	Veronica Mars	Dr. Tom Griffith	6 episodes
2006	Aquaman	Agent Brigman	Series regular
2006	Heroes	Tom McHenry	Episodes: "Nothing to Hide" and "Six Months Ago"
2007	Shark	Rob Demato	Episode: "Here Comes the Judge"
2007	Without a Trace	Dale Enty	Episode: "At Rest"
2009	Dexter	Elliot Larson	Recurring
2010	The Event	US Marshall	Recurring
2011	Grey's Anatomy	Sean Greene	Episode: "This Is How We Do It"
2011	The Mentalist	CBI Agent Ed Masterson	Episode: "Little Red Book"
2012	NCIS	Vincent Maple	Episodes: "Playing With Fire" and "Up in Smoke"
2013	Major Crimes Season 2	Michael Harris	Episode: "Pick Your Poison"
2014	NCIS: Los Angeles	Adrian Davis	Episode: "Windfall"
2015	Agent Carter	Dr. Honicky	Episode: "A Sin to Err"
2016	Criminal Minds	Warden Bart Shulman	Episode: "Devil's Backbone"
2019	Bixler High Private Eye	Russell Dewitt	Television film
