= Phoenix (NCIS) =

- NCIS episode
- Episode no.: Season 10; Episode 3
- Directed by: Terrence O'Hara
- Written by: Steven D. Binder
- Original air date: October 9, 2012

Guest appearances
- René Auberjonois as Dr. Felix Blackwell; Michael Des Barres as Del Finney; Amanda Walsh as Ellen Roberts; Shelley Robertson as Navy Captain Beverly Sharp; Jim Hoffmaster as Administrator

Episode chronology
← Previous "Recovery"	Next → "Lost at Sea"
- NCIS season 10

"Phoenix" is the third episode of the tenth season of the American police procedural drama NCIS, and the 213th episode overall. It originally aired on CBS in the United States on October 9, 2012. The episode is written by Steven D. Binder and directed by Terrence O'Hara, and was seen by 18.51 million viewers.

== Plot ==
Still on enforced leave from NCIS after his heart attack, Ducky decides to re-visit one of his old cold cases, having deceased Navy Commander Bruce Roberts exhumed and re-autopsied in secret. He has learned that Roberts had a congenital liver disorder that made him unusually subsceptible to oleander poisoning, and was murdered that way rather than dying of accidental alcohol poisoning as he had thought. Meanwhile, the team investigates the death of Marine Sergeant Raymond Hill, who was about to flee the country. A copy of Ducky's exhumation order is found in his papers, meaning the cases are related. Gibbs, in keeping with his Rule #38 ("Your case, your lead") puts Ducky in charge of the investigation, since Roberts's murder occurred first.

Abby finds traces of radioactive JSC-1 (a synthetic replica of lunar soil) on Roberts' clothing. NASA scientist Dr. Felix Blackwell, when questioned, says ordinary JSC-1 is harmless, but the radioactive material could be used in making a dirty bomb. The team begins to suspect that Commander Roberts and Sergeant Hill were involved in smuggling materials to make WMDs.

Hill's email records eventually lead them to Del Finney, a former rock star who admits, while being interrogated by Ducky, that Hill sold him what he thought was a Moon rock stolen from a North Carolina museum. When Abby examines the "Moon rock" and finds it is a replica made out of JSC-1, Ducky concludes that Hill was running a con game, selling similar replicas to Finney, Commander Roberts, and several other wealthy buyers. Hill killed Roberts when the latter began to suspect his Moon rock was fake. His accomplice was Dr. Blackwell, who falsified the results when Finney and the other buyers sent samples of their "Moon rocks" to NASA to be tested for authenticity. Blackwell killed Hill when Commander Roberts was exhumed, fearing the earlier murder would be traced back to him. Blackwell is arrested, and Gibbs informs Ducky that he has finally been cleared to resume his duties as chief medical examiner, much to an overworked Palmer's relief.

== Production ==
"Phoenix" is written by Steven D. Binder and directed by Terrence O'Hara. Binder compared Ducky's last months to a Phoenix, who after some time eventually returns. "The phoenix has become a universal symbol of rebirth and renewal - which made it the perfect title for this Ducky-centric episode. The heart attack was Act I. Act II was Ducky struggling to get his footing. And this episode is Act III… Ducky gets his mojo back." About the crime in the episode, Binder based it on the real life theft of the Mona Lisa in 1911. "I had read years ago that the Mona Lisa was stolen in 1911. But not because someone wanted the painting itself. It was stolen so the bad guys could sell knock-offs to millionaires and pass them off as the real thing. I thought that was clever."

Michael Des Barres guest stars as ex-rock star Del Finney. "I have worked on over 100 hours of television, and I have never been on a set where everyone involved made me feel that I could fly with the material, and feel safe enough, respected enough to do good work", Des Barres says. Some of the music used in the episode is from Des Barres' new album "Carnaby Street".

== Gibbs' rules ==
Rule number 38 is mentioned in this episode; "Your case, your lead", told by Gibbs to Ducky. It was previously introduced in the Season Six episode "Bounce", when Gibbs willingly takes a subordinate role to Tony, while the team is re-investigating a case that first arose during Tony's brief tenure as team leader, in Gibbs's absence.

== Reception ==
"Phoenix" was seen by 18.51 million live viewers following its broadcast on October 9, 2012, with an 11.5/18 share among all households, and 3.4/10 share among adults aged 18 to 49. A rating point represents one percent of the total number of television sets in American households, and a share means the percentage of television sets in use tuned to the program. In total viewers, "Phoenix" easily won NCIS and CBS the night. The spin-off NCIS: Los Angeles drew second and was seen by 15.18 million viewers. Compared to last week's episode "Recovery", "Phoenix" was down in both viewers and adults 18-49.

Steve Marsi from TV Fanatic gave the episode 4 (out of 5) and stated that "NCIS was a rocking good time tonight, and not just because of an eccentric '80s one-hit wonder or a faux lunar sample. "Phoenix" featured an unorthodox case with an unexpected team member running point. None other than Dr. Mallard got to run the show this week after Gibbs evoked Rule #38: Your case, your lead."
