= NCIS crossover event =

Television crossover event

- NCIS crossover event
- Original air date: January 9, 2023

Part 1: NCIS
- Episode title: "Too many Cooks"
- Episode no.: Season 20; Episode 10
- Directed by: Michael Zinberg
- Written by: Christopher J. Waild
- Production code: NCISS2010

Part 2: NCIS: Hawaiʻi
- Episode title: "Deep Fake"
- Episode no.: Season 2 Episode 10
- Directed by: Jimmy Whitmore
- Written by: Christopher Silber
- Production code: NCISHAWIS210

Part 3: NCIS: Los Angeles
- Episode title: "A Long Time Coming"
- Episode no.: Season 14; Episode 10
- Directed by: Dennis Smith
- Written by: R. Scott Gemmill
- Production code: NCISLA1409

The NCIS crossover event is a three-part crossover event between NCIS and its two spin-offs NCIS: Hawaiʻi and NCIS: Los Angeles that aired on CBS on January 9, 2023.

== Cast and characters ==
The following contains a list of actors receiving main billing in the crossover event:

Actor	Character	Episode		
Actor	Character	NCIS	NCIS: Hawaiʻi	NCIS: Los Angeles
Sean Murray	Timothy McGee	Main		
Wilmer Valderrama	Nicholas Torres	Main		Guest
Katrina Law	Jessica Knight	Main		
Brian Dietzen	Jimmy Palmer	Main	Guest	
Diona Reasonover	Kasie Hines	Main		
Rocky Carroll	Leon Vance	Main		
David McCallum	Donald "Ducky" Mallard	Main (Note: Despite being credited David McCallum did not appear in the episode)		
Gary Cole	Alden Parker	Main	Guest	Guest
Vanessa Lachey	Jane Tennant	Guest	Main	Guest
Alex Tarrant	Kai Holman		Main	
Noah Mills	Jesse Boone	Guest	Main	
Yasmine Al-Bustami	Lucy Tara		Main (Note: Despite being credited Yasmine Al-Bustami did not appear in the episode)	Guest
Jason Antoon	Ernie Malik		Main	
Tori Anderson	Kathrine Marie "Kate" Whistler		Main	
Tori Anderson	Kathrine Marie "Kate" Whistler		Main	
Kian Talan	Alex Tennant		Main (Note: Despite being credited Kian Talan did not appear in the episode)	
Chris O'Donnell	Grisha "G." Callen	Guest	Guest	Main
Daniela Ruah	Kensi Blye			Main
Eric Christian Olsen	Marty Deeks			Main
Medalion Rahimi	Fatima Namazi			Main
Caleb Castille	Devin Roundtree			Main
Gerald McRaney	Hollace Kilbride			Main
LL Cool J	Sam Hanna	Guest	Guest	Main

== Plot ==
=== Part 1: NCIS Season 20 Episode 10 "Too Many Cooks" ===
Agents from Hawaii and Los Angeles convene in DC to attend the retirement party of Dale Harding (Robert Picardo), a beloved FLETC professor, but when he commits suicide that morning the teams work together to determine why he had classified files. McGee is briefly thought to be responsible for treason, though he is cleared of wrongdoing soon after. The case escalates to a manhunt for Simon Williams, whose picture has been on the NCIS Most Wanted wall for a lengthy period, then takes a grim turn when Palmer and Tennant go missing.

=== Part 2: NCIS: Hawaiʻi Season 2 Episode 10 "Deep Fake" ===
Tennant and DC medical examiner Jimmy Palmer, along with Los Angeles agent Sam Hanna, are kidnapped and held prisoner by a woman claiming to be a CIA agent investigating Simon Williams. Meanwhile, DC agent-in-charge Parker works with the Hawaii branch to find their missing teammates. They have a similar situation with a CIA agent, who turns out to be an imposter. The team eventually discovers that Simon Williams is a pseudonym as part of a prior CIA assassination program, and that anyone affiliated with it is now in grave danger. Upon discovering that one of the members is none other than his boss, retired Navy Admiral Hollace Kilbride, Sam's partner, NCIS Special Agent G. Callen prepares to return to Los Angeles with Tennant accompanying him.

=== Part 3: NCIS: Los Angeles Season 14 Episode 10 "A Long Time Coming" ===
As Kilbride goes missing, Fatima and Roundtree are attacked by gunmen led by rogue CIA agent Morgan Miller with the abduction seeing Roundtree being kidnapped. The team continues to work with their D.C. and Hawaii colleagues to find Roundtree all while investigating the Simon Williams program. Meanwhile Rountree is tortured for information on Kilbride's whereabouts while the teams learn their identities have been posted on the Dark Web which means every cartel member, hitman, gang and psychopath are also after them to claim the bounties on their heads.

== Production ==
On October 3, 2022, it was announced that an official three-way crossover between NCIS and it's spin-offs NCIS: Hawaiʻi and NCIS: Los Angeles would air in the beginning of 2023.

== Reception ==
=== Ratings ===
Viewership and ratings per episode of NCIS crossover event
No.	Title	Air date	Timeslot (ET)	Rating (18–49)	Viewers (millions)	DVR (18–49)	DVR viewers (millions)	Total (18–49)	Total viewers (millions)
1	"Too Many Cooks - NCIS"	January 9, 2023	Monday; 8:00 p.m.	0.56	7.93	0.3	3.33	0.8	11.25
2	"Deep Fake - NCIS: Hawaii"	January 9, 2023	Monday; 9:00 p.m.	0.53	7.19	0.3	3.19	0.8	10.55
3	"A Long Time Coming - NCIS: Los Angeles"	January 9, 2023	Monday; 10:00 p.m.	0.5	6.64	0.3	3.16	0.8	9.96

In the United States, the first part of the crossover was watched live by 7.93 million viewers. The second part was watched live by 7.36 million viewers, while the third and final part was watched live by 6.80 million viewers.
