= Mark Horowitz (director) =

American television producer and director

Mark Horowitz is an American television producer and director. He has produced and directed for JAG, NCIS, and Doogie Howser, M.D.
