= Recovery (NCIS) =

- NCIS episode
- Episode no.: Season 10; Episode 2
- Directed by: Dennis Smith
- Written by: Scott Williams
- Original air date: October 2, 2012

Guest appearances
- Steve Valentine as Miles Wolf; Jessica Collins as Judy Ford; Daniel Louis Rivas as Kyle Davis; Robb Derringer as Jon Phelps; Emily C. Chang as Phyllis Moss; Anna Osceola as Navy Ensign Grace Watkins; Larry Bagby as Craig Wilson; Andrea C. Robinson as Midge Watkins; Jeff Campanella as Store Clerk

Episode chronology
← Previous "Extreme Prejudice"	Next → "Phoenix"
- NCIS season 10

"Recovery" is the second episode of the tenth season of the American police procedural drama NCIS, and the 212th episode overall. It originally aired on CBS in the United States on October 2, 2012. The episode is written by Scott Williams and directed by Dennis Smith, and was seen by 18.87 million viewers.

== Plot ==
The NCIS building goes under renovations following the bombing four months prior, with the traumatic events forcing Gibbs and his team to undergo mandatory psych evaluations. Then, they are called into service when the former armory manager is found dead in the river, having disappeared after the bombing. Soon, they discover she was murdered. It turns out that one of the heads of the renovation is the murderer, jealous of her boyfriend (an armorer)'s relationship with the manager. Meanwhile, Abby is shown to have nightmares that she is dead in autopsy. Gibbs asks the psychologist to check on Abby. She later tells Gibbs that the nightmares are a result of her fear of being alone, leading Gibbs to advise her to talk to her biological brother. She manages to do so and they acknowledge their bloodline, and she later invites him to dinner with her at Gibbs' house. When the psychologist, Miles Wolf (Steve Valentine), confronts Vance, he reveals that he wants the building back to its original standards as he wants to go back in time and prevent the attack, believing he is responsible for the attack.

== Production ==
"Recovery" is written by Scott Williams and directed by Dennis Smith. "Our agents recover a co-worker who’s been missing since our season finale bombing. But they also begin recovering from the loss of any true sense of security", Williams says about the characters in the episode. Pauley Perrette, who portrays Abby, told TV Line that "Abby is the sensitive one — she feels the most pain and worries about everyone — so she’s really, really shaken up". According to executive producer Gary Glasberg, "Gibbs sort of helps her reach out to her brother in helping her get through that". Ducky, on the other hand, "has to take a mandatory step backwards and figure out what his role is going to be", as he no longer is the active medical examiner.

== Reception ==
"Recovery" was seen by 18.87 million live viewers following its broadcast on October 2, 2012, with an 11.4/18 share among all households, and 3.7/11 share among adults aged 18 to 49. A rating point represents one percent of the total number of television sets in American households, and a share means the percentage of television sets in use tuned to the program. In total viewers, "Recovery" easily won NCIS and CBS the night. The spin-off NCIS: Los Angeles drew second and was seen by 14.91 million viewers. Compared to last week's episode "Extreme Prejudice", "Recovery" was down in both viewers and adults 18–49.

Steve Marsi from TV Fanatic gave the episode 4.5 (out of 5) and stated that "With the emotional wounds of the bombing still omnipresent, most of this week's episode struck a somber tone. The team members each battled their issues in their individual ways, and it wasn't pretty. At the same time, this installment was more about the characters than the case, which is when NCIS is at its best. It also revisited Abby's brother Kyle, a popular storyline introduced fleetingly last year. The writers did a nice job of expounding upon Abby's relationship with Kyle, and of course with Gibbs, as a result of the traumatic blast. Sometimes, we learn the most about ourselves in the darkest of times."
