= Up in Smoke (NCIS) =

- NCIS episode
- Episode no.: Season 9 Episode 23
- Directed by: James Whitmore, Jr.
- Written by: Steven D. Binder
- Original air date: May 8, 2012

Guest appearances
- Brian Dietzen as Jimmy Palmer; Jamie Lee Curtis as Samantha Ryan; Matt L. Jones as Probationary Agent Ned Dorneget; Richard Schiff as Harper Dearing; Rick Peters as Vincent Maple; Jason Gray-Stanford as Dr. Jay Berman; Dimiter D. Marinov as Ghenna Kozlov; Loren Lester as Dr. Edgar Cromwell; Dylan Kenn as Freddie Fountain

Episode chronology
← Previous "Playing with Fire"	Next → "Till Death Do Us Part"
- NCIS season 9

"Up in Smoke" is the 23rd episode of the ninth season of the American police procedural drama NCIS, and the 209th episode overall. It was written by Steven D. Binder and directed by James Whitmore, Jr. It aired on CBS on May 8, 2012 and had 18.20 million viewers.

== Plot ==
When a bug is found in Probationary Agent Ned Dorneget's tooth, the team goes full force in the effort to arrest Harper Dearing. The team receives multiple suspects, one of which is Dorneget's dentist, which ends up leading to an MTAC call from Dearing himself. He reveals the reason he is doing this is Gibbs' fault. The team discovers that Dearing's son was a Navy sailor who was killed by a manufacturing defect that could have easily been avoided, and that his plans are to take revenge on the Navy by exploiting similar weaknesses. Since Gibbs was in charge of the case, Dr Samantha Ryan surmises that Dearing has cast Gibbs as his nemesis. The team pursues a lead from information provided by Ryan that Dearing might be manufacturing defective Navy artillery rounds. However, the plot turns out to be a wild goose chase concocted by Dearing, which leads Gibbs to wonder whether Dr Ryan is really on their side or not. After receiving a text from Dearing, Gibbs calls DiNozzo and finds out from DiNozzo and Ziva that Director Vance has gone missing.

== Production ==
Richard Schiff is introduced as the character of Harper Dearing, who, following the previous episode is NCIS' most wanted fugitive. Introduced in the episode "Playing with Fire", Dearing is haunted by the loss of his son, who died in a terrorist bombing some years earlier. According to executive producer Gary Glasberg, Schiff is joining NCIS for a multi-episode arc. "This arc is something that we’ve been talking about for a while," Glasberg says of Dearing's terrorist plot which started in the episode "Rekindled".

Brian Dietzen (as Jimmy Palmer), Jamie Lee Curtis (as Dr. Samantha Ryan) and Matt L. Jones (as NCIS Probationary Agent Ned Dorneget) continued their recurring roles on NCIS.

== Reception ==
Among its 18.20 million live viewers it had an 11.7/19 share among all households, and 3.1/10 share among adults aged 18 to 49. In total viewers, "Playing with Fire" easily won NCIS and CBS the night. The spin-off NCIS: Los Angeles drew second and was seen by 14.56 million viewers. The episode was the most watched television program the week it aired. Compared to last week's episode "Playing with Fire", "Up in Smoke" was up a bit in viewers and even in adults 18-49.

Steve Marsi from TV Fanatic gave the episode 4.5 (out of 5) and stated "Few shows would leave their main character so flummoxed at such a crucial juncture, or send the team down the wrong path for the better part of an episode as "Up in Smoke" did this evening. That's part of what makes this arc (and NCIS in general) so good, though. Every chapter fits into a broader narrative, keeping you guessing as to what's next while remaining entertaining on its own merit."
