= Shell Shock (Part II) =

- NCIS episode
- Ziva tells Tony about her deceased sister and why she goes to the opera every year
- Episode no.: Season 10; Episode 7
- Directed by: Tom Wright
- Written by: Gina Monreal
- Original air date: November 20, 2012

Guest appearances
- Brad Beyer as Marine Captain Joe Westcott; Mark Rolston as George Westcott; Glen Powell as Marine Sergeant Evan Westcott; David Hoflin as Randall J. Kersey; Chris McGarry as Lieutenant Commander/Doctor Peter Sanger; Matt Caplan as Marine Private Paul "McCartney" Patterson; Alexandra Holden as Brooke Fenten; Vinicius Machado as Sam Mathis; Marc Anthony Samuel as Marine Private First Class James Hall; Tyler Ross as Adam Horne; Minni Jo Mazzola as Jessie Cantrell; Hector Atreyu Ruiz as Marine First Lieutenant Michael Torres

Episode chronology
← Previous "Shell Shock (Part I)"	Next → "Gone"
- NCIS season 10

"Shell Shock (Part II)" is the seventh episode of the tenth season of the American police procedural drama NCIS and the 217th episode overall. It originally aired on CBS in the United States on November 20, 2012. The episode is written by Gina Monreal and directed by Tom Wright and was seen by 16.47 million viewers.

Gibbs continues to work with Captain Westcott while he retraces his steps in order to help the NCIS team track down a terrorist. With Thanksgiving on the horizon, Abby's enthusiasm for the NCIS family dinner is building and Tony's curiosity is peaking when he learns Ziva is making special plans for the opera.

The episode concludes the plot introduced in "Shell Shock (Part I)".

== Plot ==
With Kersey on the run, Gibbs and the team try to track him down before he can stage his attacks. However, searches of his house and questioning his girlfriend fail to give them any leads. Meanwhile, Ziva begins acting strangely and is frustrated after a failed attempt to get tickets for an opera, which makes DiNozzo curious as he attempts to pry to find out what is troubling her.

With no options left, Gibbs brings back Westcott, hoping he can jog his memory to find out any leads. However, Westcott's PTSD interferes with his memories, and he is reluctant to help. Gibbs then takes him to the convenience store where he and Torres were last seen before Torres' death. Westcott then remembers seeing Kersey enter the store and hand over a piece of paper to a blue haired girl. As Gibbs tries to help Westcott deal with his PTSD, DiNozzo and Ziva stake out the store to see if the blue haired girl comes back. Ziva then finally admits that there's no man whatsoever due to Tony having suspected Ziva was dating someone and that Thanksgiving is in fact her deceased sister Tali's birthday, and that the holiday has always been difficult for her to deal with. She also reveals that she goes to an opera every year on Tali's birthday, as her sister had wanted to be a singer, but that they were all sold out this year. They then find and intercept the blue haired girl, who turns out to be an unwitting courier for the bomb. She leads the team to Kersey, where he is promptly arrested and his bomb is confiscated.

In interrogation, Gibbs attempts to play Kersey's conscience in order to get him to reveal the location of the second bomb. However, Kersey resists and spits on the pictures of Westcott's slain men. Witnessing this, Westcott flies into a rage and storms into Interrogation, attacking Kersey, forcing Gibbs and DiNozzo to physically restrain Westcott who then gets a sudden flashback and remembers seeing a picture of Kersey's girlfriend in the insurgent base, meaning she is his accomplice. Putting together the collected evidence, the team discovers that Kersey's girlfriend is planning to bomb a local senator's Thanksgiving party which would take out a huge number of the United States Congress in the process. They warn the police in time to have the bomb disarmed, and the team intercepts Kersey's girlfriend before she can escape, Kersey's girlfriend having disguised herself as a police officer.

With the case closed, Gibbs takes Westcott to see one of his men. They both make amends for what happened in the ambush, and are both determined to work through their PTSD. Westcott apologizes for running from the battle, but the squadmate corrects him, saying that Westcott had never fled from the battle, and in fact was the one to rescue the captured Marine. However, Westcott's guilt made him remember the event incorrectly. Westcott then feels much better about himself now that he knows that he was never a coward.

Back at NCIS headquarters, since Ziva missed the opera she had wanted to attend due to the case, DiNozzo sets up the sound system to play an opera so that she can imagine that she is at the opera with Tali at her side.

== Production ==
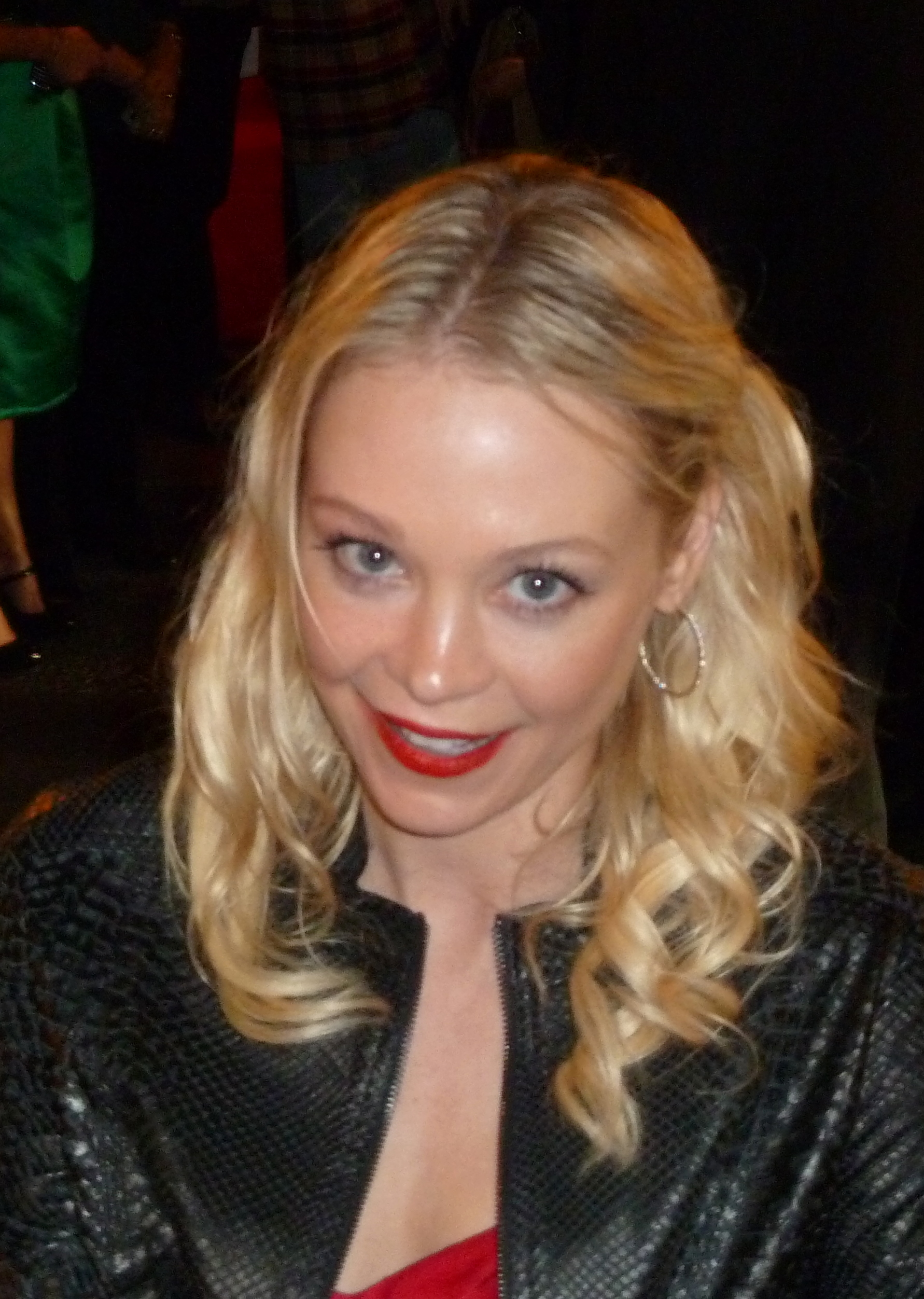
Alexandra Holden guest starred as Brooke Fenten, the girlfriend of Randall J. Kersey.

"Shell Shock (Part II)" is written by Gina Monreal and directed by Tom Wright. Alexandra Holden is introduced as Brooke Fenten, the main suspect Randall J. Kersey's girlfriend. On September 22, 2012, showrunner Gary Glasberg announced the "theme" for the season being "fallen heroes". The two-part episode "Shell Shock" is an example of this, with Marine Captain Joe Westcott suffering from PTSD after his squad was ambushed back in Iraq. "We've been talking to the Navy and the Marines about doing a PTSD story for a long time", Glasberg said. "It's a delicate subject matter, and a really important subject matter. We wanted to make sure that we did it properly and handled it properly. So there was a tremendous amount of research that went into this story, and I'm really proud of it."

The writers and the actors had to do much research to understand the impact of PTSD in the navy. According to Brad Beyer (who portrays Joe Westcott), "The one thing that stood out in my head is a lot of these guys that come back, you don't necessarily know what's wrong with them. It can be really subtle. These guys are always reliving it. They can't decipher between memory and what's going on in the present. I did the best I could to bring a sort of heightened sense to the confusion."

== Reception ==
"Shell Shock (Part II)" was seen by 16.47 million live viewers following its broadcast on November 20, 2012, with a 3.0/9 share among adults aged 18 to 49. A rating point represents one percent of the total number of television sets in American households, and a share means the percentage of television sets in use tuned to the program. In total viewers, "Shell Shock (Part II)" easily won NCIS and CBS the night. The spin-off NCIS: Los Angeles drew second and was seen by 15.13 million viewers. Compared to the last episode "Shell Shock (Part I)", "Shell Shock (Part II)" was down in both viewers and adults 18–49.

Mary Powers from TV Fanatic gave the episode 4.8 (out of 5) and stated that "While NCIS has been a primarily character-driven show, "Shell Shock Part I" was an exception, with the focus on the case. It was a very good one, too. Captain Westcott appeared to be suffering from severe PTSD, attacking a random person for no reason. But there was more to the story, as the person he attacked was one of the men in the ambush in Afghanistan that made him into the damaged man he is today. "Shell Shock, Part II," meanwhile, was unique in that the case was still fantastic, but we also enjoyed a good deal of the episode focusing on the characters as well, primarily Gibbs."
