= Playing with Fire (NCIS) =

- NCIS episode
- Episode no.: Season 9 Episode 22
- Directed by: Dennis Smith
- Written by: George Schenck & Frank Cardea
- Original air date: May 1, 2012

Guest appearances
- Joel Gretsch as NCIS Special Agent Stan Burley; Nigel Gibbs as Admiral Theodore Tully; Elizabeth Ho as NCIS Analyst Emma Park; James Harvey Ward as Andre Fullerton; Rick Peters as Vincent Maple; Karina Logue as Mrs. Johnson; Dan Martin as Mail Carrier; Rob Nagle as Wayne Usher; Patrick Faucette as Security Guard; Tony Christopher as Seaman; Robert Sloan as Tobey Abbott; Maggie Henry as Seaman Apprentice; Richard Schiff as Harper Dearing

Episode chronology
← Previous "Rekindled"	Next → "Up in Smoke"
- NCIS season 9

"Playing with Fire" is the 22nd episode of the ninth season of the American police procedural drama NCIS, and the 208th episode overall. It aired on CBS in the United States on May 1, 2012. The episode was written by George Schenck and Frank Cardea and directed by Dennis Smith, and was seen by 17.58 million viewers.

== Plot ==
In the aftermath of the arson attack aboard the USS Brewer, the NCIS team discovers evidence of it being caused by the same arson explosive from earlier. The explosive went off prematurely, causing only minor damage to the ship and two casualties, including the bomber. They also discover that a similar explosive was found on the USS Benjamin Franklin stationed in Naples, Italy. Ziva and DiNozzo team up with NCIS Agent Stan Burley to apprehend the arsonist who they manage to capture, though Burley is injured in the process. Through a transmission, Gibbs interrogates the arsonist Andre Fullerton and threatens to have him sent to a special section at GITMO's detention camp if he doesn't give him the identity of the person who hired him. Gibbs discovers that the mastermind of the bombings is an investment fund CEO named Harper Dearing. After finding out that Dearing has been missing for over a year, Gibbs declares to a room full of NCIS personnel, including Abby, Ducky and McGee as well as Tony, Burley and Ziva, that Dearing is now NCIS's most wanted fugitive, putting his picture up over that of the deceased Osama bin Laden.

Meanwhile, Ducky admits to Gibbs that he is in a moral dilemma since he inherited a large sum of money from his deceased mother, but does not know what to do with it. Ultimately, he decides to make Gibbs the executor of his will, and intends to donate much of his newfound wealth to a charity meant to provide scholarships to the children of US Marines.

== Production ==
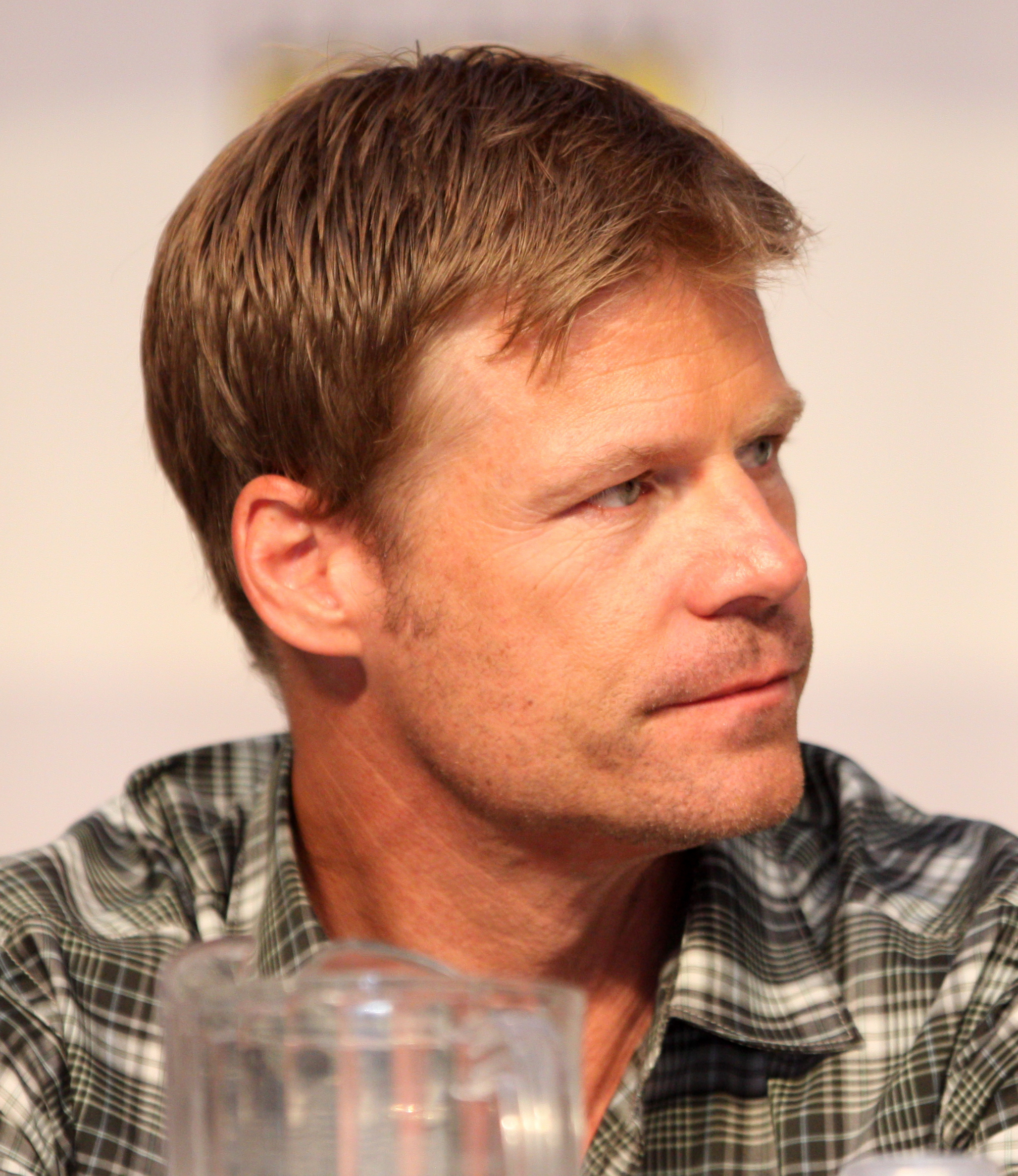
Joel Gretsch reprised his role as NCIS Special Agent Stan Burley.

"Playing with Fire" was written by George Schenck and Frank Cardea and directed by Dennis Smith. The episode marks the return of NCIS agent Stan Burley (Joel Gretsch). He was last seen in the season 1 episode "High Seas". "Over the years we've discussed bringing back Joel Gretsch as NCIS Special Agent Burley", the writers said. "He appeared in Episode 6, "High Seas." It may be the longest time interval in TV history for a character to reoccur."

The episode also feature Ducky's (David McCallum) will, which include donations to the Marine Corps. Scholarship Foundation. "For several years we've been aware that David McCallum's favorite charity is the Marine Corps. Scholarship Foundation. We finally got a chance to introduce it into a story and explain how it helps the children of Marine veterans."

== Reception ==
"Playing with Fire" was seen by 17.58 million live viewers following its broadcast on May 1, 2012, with an 11.1/18 share among all households, and 3.1/10 share among adults aged 18 to 49. A rating point represents one percent of the total number of television sets in American households, and a share means the percentage of television sets in use tuned to the program. In total viewers, "Playing with Fire" easily won NCIS and CBS the night. The spin-off NCIS: Los Angeles drew second and was seen by 15.21 million viewers. The episode was the most watched television program the week it aired. Compared to the last episode "Rekindled", "Playing with Fire" was down a bit in viewers and even in adults 18-49.

Steve Marsi from TV Fanatic gave the episode 5 (out of 5) and stated "Because of the nature of the deepening mystery, the episode was light on action for most of the hour, but the compelling, perfectly-paced story more than made up for it. When the show commits itself to continuity over multiple weeks like this, the stories are less rushed and often feel more organic."
