= Lost at Sea (NCIS) =

- NCIS episode
- Episode no.: Season 10; Episode 4
- Directed by: Tony Wharmby
- Written by: Christopher J. Waild
- Original air date: October 23, 2012

Guest appearances
- Diane Neal as CGIS Special Agent Abigail Borin; Rick Worthy as Navy Captain Logan Doyle; Bernard Curry as Seamus Quinn; Linda Park as JAG Officer Lieutenant Nora Patel; Derek Ray as Navy Lieutenant Commander David Hernandez; Amy Stewart as Katie Happ; Nondumiso Tembe as Navy Petty officer First Class Josie Sparks; Chad Gall as Navy Lieutenant Hank Joplin; Pamela Dunlap as Mom; Cuyle Carvin as Navy Lieutenant Commander Oliver Happ

Episode chronology
← Previous "Phoenix"	Next → "The Namesake"
- NCIS season 10

"Lost at Sea" is the fourth episode of the tenth season of the American police procedural drama NCIS, and the 214th episode overall. It originally aired on CBS in the United States on October 23, 2012. The episode is written by Christopher J. Waild and directed by Tony Wharmby, and was seen by 17.78 million viewers.

== Plot ==
NCIS is called in to investigate a helicopter crash when the missing crew washes up on the shore. However, the pilot is still missing. Meanwhile, Ziva is upset that DiNozzo and McGee gloat about meeting a group of girls on a night out and their arranging a next-time. Fed up of their gloating, ZIva dares the two to ask out the first woman they see, which happens to be CGIS agent Borin, who is also investigating the crash. After interviewing the two conscious crew members, the team fails to find any information that can point to the exact location of the crash or the pilot. Ducky also notes that besides severe dehydration and exposure, the crew lacks any of the injuries consistent with a helicopter crash. Soon after, while looking for any helicopter wreckage on the beach, DiNozzo and McGee find the pilot's corpse and discover that he was shot in the head. When confronted with this revelation, the crew claims that the pilot was mentally unstable and tried to commit suicide after finding out his son was terminally ill.

However, Gibbs is skeptical after hearing differing accounts from the pilot's wife and commanding officer. When the fourth crew member regains consciousness, he admits that the pilot didn't try to commit suicide. With this new evidence, the team interrogates the crew again and they finally crack, and admit that they had planned to sell the helicopter. The original plan came from the three crew and their commanding officer, who baulked at the last minute. So the others told the pilot, thinking he'd go along to get money for his son. The pilot initially went along with them, but quickly reveals he intended to catch them all and have them arrested, only to be shot and killed by the buyer. The crewmen were then forced into a life raft and left to drift far from their supposed crash point. With the crew's testimony, the team tracks down and arrests the buyer and recovers the helicopter. Meanwhile, Ziva learns that Dinozzo and McGees 'wild night' was actually an online games marathon with a sorority-sister team. She also reveals that she told Borin about the bet and that it was a ploy to teach them a lesson for not inviting her out to their recreational activities.

== Production ==
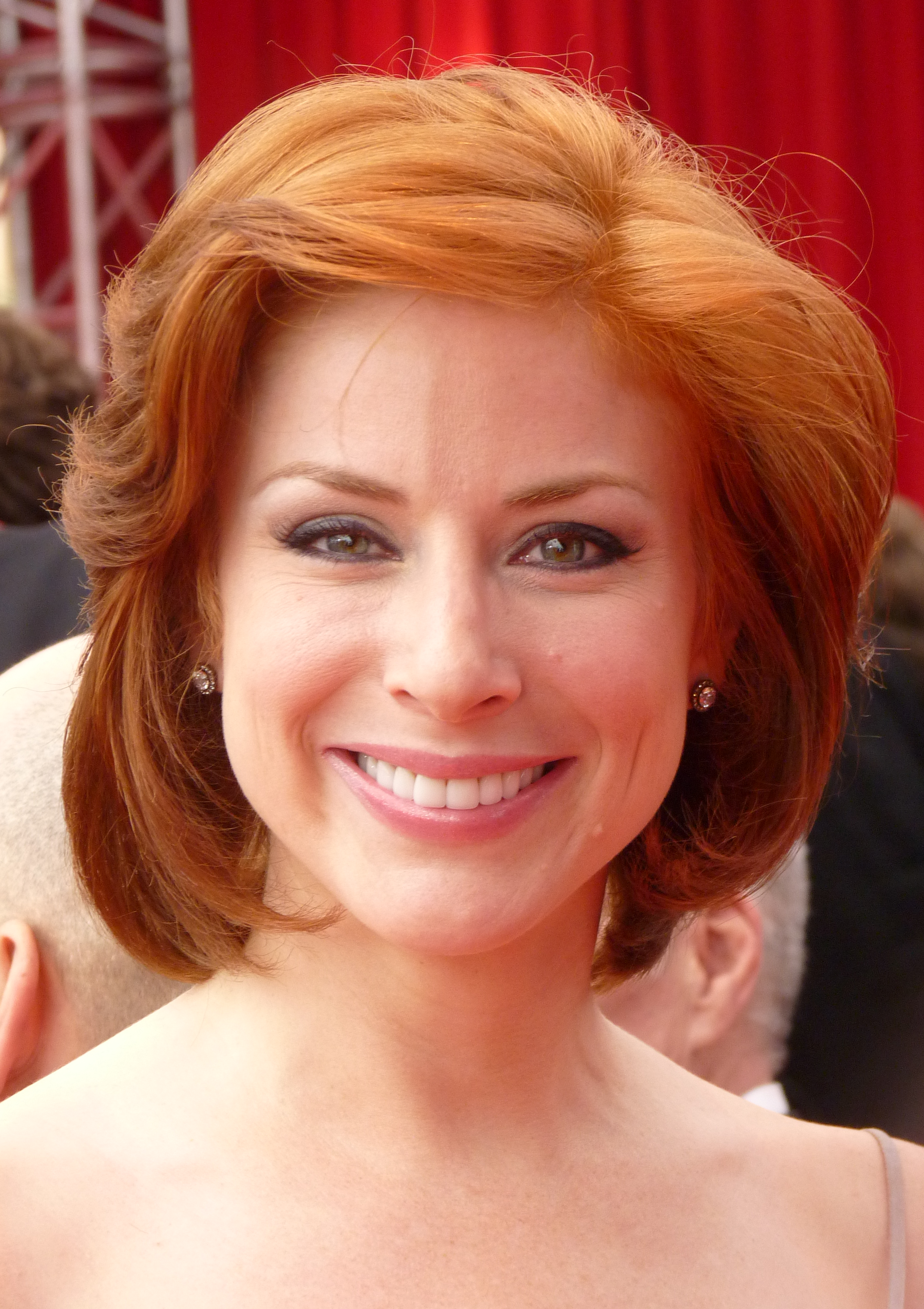
Diane Neal guest starred as CGIS Agent Abigail Borin in "Lost at Sea".

"Lost at Sea" is written by Christopher J. Waild and directed by Tony Wharmby. According to Waild, the story in "Lost at Sea" has been "kicking around" for some time. "When Gary originally tasked me with building a case surrounding a mysterious helicopter crash, I was thrilled and thought it would be a perfect opportunity to bring back CGIS Special Agent Borin. Unfortunately, at the time, production schedules did not work out and the episode was postponed."

== Reception ==
"Lost at Sea" was seen by 17.78 million live viewers following its broadcast on October 23, 2012, with a 10.9/17 share among all households, and 3.2/9 share among adults aged 18 to 49. A rating point represents one percent of the total number of television sets in American households, and a share means the percentage of television sets in use tuned to the program. In total viewers, "Lost at Sea" easily won NCIS and CBS the night. The spin-off NCIS: Los Angeles drew second and was seen by 16.53 million viewers. Compared to last week's episode "Phoenix", "Lost at Sea" was down in both viewers and adults 18-49.

Steve Marsi from TV Fanatic gave the episode 4.5 (out of 5) and stated that "The case took so many turns and [the scrap dealer] fit so nicely into Borin messing with Tony and Tim, it was easy to miss his connection to the crime ... until it was revealed that the officers were selling the machine, of course. Very enjoyable episode overall. We'll all have installments we like more than others, for various reasons, but I think we can all agree so far that NCIS has plenty left in its tank in Season 10."
