= Extreme Prejudice (NCIS) =

- NCIS episode
- Episode no.: Season 10; Episode 1
- Directed by: Tony Wharmby
- Written by: Gary Glasberg
- Original air date: September 25, 2012

Guest appearances
- Matt Craven as Secretary of the Navy Clayton Jarvis; Joe Spano as Senior FBI Agent Tobias Fornell; Richard Schiff as Harper Dearing; Roberta Hanlen as Joann Dearing; Heather Stephens as Lorraine; Javier Grajeda as Dr. Kelly Whelan; Jossie Thacker as Nurse Wanda Dupree

Episode chronology
← Previous "Till Death Do Us Part"	Next → "Recovery"
- NCIS season 10

"Extreme Prejudice" is the first episode of the tenth season of the American police procedural drama NCIS, and the 211th episode overall. It originally aired on CBS in the United States on September 25, 2012. The episode is written by Gary Glasberg and directed by Tony Wharmby, and was seen by 20.48 million viewers.

In this episode, NCIS and the FBI hunt down Harper Dearing after being ordered by the President to "terminate him with extreme prejudice" for the NCIS bombing.

== Plot ==
Following the events of the season nine finale, the NCIS team regroup in the aftermath of the Navy Yard bombing. Gibbs, Abby, and Vance escape the explosion with only a few cuts, while McGee is hospitalized after being impaled in the stomach by a shard of glass. Ziva and Tony remain unaccounted for, trapped in an elevator, though they are able to escape. At the same time in Florida, Ducky manages to survive his heart attack, while Palmer is forced to leave his side and return to the Navy Yard to autopsy the dead. Angered by the bombing of the Navy Yard and NCIS Headquarters, SECNAV Clayton Jarvis conveys that the President has authorized the use of "extreme prejudice" to bring Dearing to justice. The FBI, CIA, and Homeland Security are called in to aid in the hunt for Harper Dearing, with FBI Agent and Gibbs' close friend Tobias Fornell leading the effort. Dearing sets a trap, however, that results in the murder of multiple FBI agents. Realizing that Dearing simply wants to be left alone, now that he has accomplished all he set out to do, NCIS creates a fake announcement that they have arrested Dearing's ex-wife for aiding and abetting, in hopes of forcing Dearing to continue playing the game that he started. However, the pursuit ends when Dearing seemingly kills himself to avoid capture.

Two months later, Gibbs is still unconvinced of Dearing's death, his suspicions confirmed when Ducky and Palmer discover the dead body is not Dearing, but rather his previously deceased brother. After Gibbs puts pressure on Dearing's sister-in-law Joann to reveal his location, NCIS and FBI raid Dearing's bomb-making cabin in the Appalachians, only to find that he has once again eluded them. Gibbs convinces Vance that the only way to approach Dearing is to approach him alone; Vance hesitantly agrees, and Gibbs is finally able to confront Dearing, who compares himself with Gibbs and the pain of unjustly losing a child. Gibbs stabs and kills Dearing in self-defense before Dearing can shoot him, as the latter man planned to do, ending Dearing's threat permanently. The episode ends in late September with Gibbs passing by a memorial to the victims of the bombing, while a conversation between Dearing and his deceased son Evan plays in the background.

== Production ==
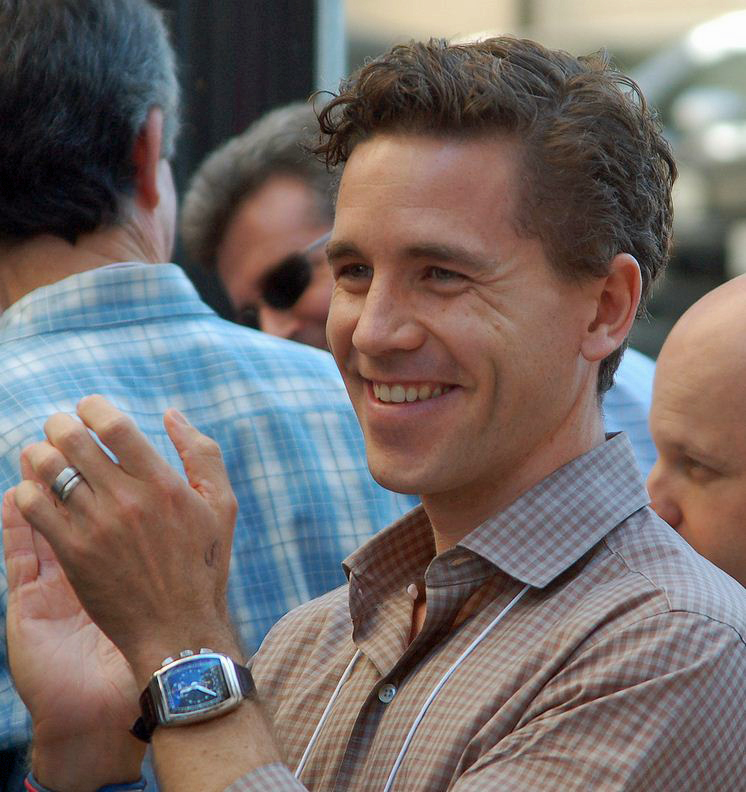
Brian Dietzen was promoted to series regular in this episode.

"Extreme Prejudice" is written by Gary Glasberg and directed by Tony Wharmby. This is the first episode to feature Brian Dietzen as a series regular on the show. Previously Dietzen had a recurring role on NCIS, starting in late season 1. "After eight years of being with the show, I got a contract with CBS, and I couldn’t be happier about it," Dietzen said to Entertainment Weekly.

Executive producer Gary Glasberg wanted to have a different ending of the episode. Instead of using a gun, Gibbs brings a knife. "For the actual take-down scene at the end, I wanted to do something different", he said. Glasberg also reveals that some of the "moments" from the episode will be continued later in the season. "Like every season opener, this episode had to wrap up one story and launch several others. Ziva's father, Eli, called to check on her. McGee talked about his dad, the Admiral. And don't forget Gibbs measuring his basement as he prepared to begin building something new. Each is a thread you'll see again as the coming season progresses."

== Reception ==
"Extreme Prejudice" was seen by 20.48 million live viewers following its broadcast on September 25, 2012, with a 12.5/19 share among all households, and 4.1/12 share among adults aged 18 to 49. A rating point represents one percent of the total number of television sets in American households, and a share means the percentage of television sets in use tuned to the program. In total viewers, "Extreme Prejudice" easily won NCIS and CBS the night. It's the second largest premiere on the show, only beaten by the season 7 episode "Truth or Consequences" back in 2009. The spin-off NCIS: Los Angeles drew second and was seen by 16.74 million viewers. The episode was the second most watched television program the week it aired. Compared to the last episode "Till Death Do Us Part", "Extreme Prejudice" was up in both viewers and adults 18–49.

In Canada "Extreme Prejudice" was seen by 2.61 million live viewers following its broadcast on September 25, 2012.

Steve Marsi from TV Fanatic gave the episode 4.5 (out of 5) and stated that "As premieres go, it didn't quite live up to the hype, with the conclusion a bit anticlimactic and parts feeling somewhat disjointed. Nevertheless, it was enjoyable, and it's great to have the team back in one piece."
