= Shell Shock (Part I) =

- NCIS episode
- Gibbs and Tony find Westcott
- Episode no.: Season 10; Episode 6
- Directed by: Leslie Libman
- Written by: Nichole Mirante-Matthews
- Original air date: November 13, 2012

Guest appearances
- Brad Beyer as Marine Captain Joe Westcott; Mark Rolston as George Westcott; Glen Powell as Marine Sergeant Evan Westcott; David Hoflin as Randall J. Kersey; Chris McGarry as Lieutenant Commander/Doctor Peter Sanger; Vinicius Machado as Sam Mathis; Doris Morgado as Andrea Aldridge; Hector Atreyu Ruiz as Marine First Lieutenant Michael Torres

Episode chronology
← Previous "The Namesake"	Next → "Shell Shock (Part II)"
- NCIS season 10

"Shell Shock (Part I)" is the sixth episode of the tenth season of the American police procedural drama NCIS, and the 216th episode overall. It originally aired on CBS in the United States on November 13, 2012. The episode is written by Nichole Mirante-Matthews and directed by Leslie Libman, and was seen by 17.05 million viewers.

When a Marine Lieutenant who recently returned home from the Middle East is found dead from a brutal attack, the NCIS team questions the victim’s friend, Marine Captain Joe Wescott. Gibbs realizes the Captain is suffering from post-traumatic stress disorder, but knows his experience overseas may also provide a key link to the crime.

The plot continues in "Shell Shock (Part II)".

== Plot ==
The episode opens with two men fleeing a gang, only to be apprehended and severely beaten. One man is dragged into the darkness while the other escapes. The following morning, the team is summoned to examine the body of the abducted man, Lieutenant Michael Torres. It is discovered that Torres was accompanied by his commanding officer, Captain Joe Westcott, leading them to Westcott's residence. Westcott recounts the assault and expresses guilt for not attempting to rescue Torres. However, Gibbs remains skeptical about the completeness of Westcott's story. Further discrepancies arise from Ducky's autopsy, which indicates that Torres was attacked by only two individuals, contradicting Westcott's statement. Additionally, the surveillance footage of the incident is inconclusive due to corruption of the recording medium.

Gibbs then has Westcott tell him about the story of how his squad was ambushed by insurgents in Iraq shortly before their tour of duty ended. Several of Westcott's men were killed and Westcott himself witnessed one of his men getting captured. However, rather than try to help him, Westcott fled in fear. Though the captured soldier was rescued by another squadmate, he died shortly after due to his wounds. Westcott can't forgive himself for succumbing to cowardice and it is revealed that he has post-traumatic stress disorder, as he is constantly reliving the ambush in his mind.

The team manages to clean up the surveillance footage and sees that there were only three men involved in the fight: Westcott, Torres, and another man named Randall J. Kersey, who claims never to have seen Westcott nor has he been outside the country. They surmise that Westcott suffered another PTSD episode; he believed Kersey was one of the insurgents and began to assault him. Torres tried to intervene but was knocked down and struck his head on the pavement, dying instantly.

After sending Westcott to therapy to have his PTSD treated, Gibbs has McGee obtain satellite photos of the insurgent base where Westcott had been ambushed. To the team's shock, they discover that Kersey was indeed present at the base as one of the insurgents. The team raids Kersey's house but are too late: Kersey has already fled but the team discovers evidence that he had already built two bombs and is planning an attack.

Meanwhile, Tony finds an old camera with photos of his mother, who died when he was eight years old. Unfortunately, McGee gets hold of Tony's embarrassing old high school portrait and Ziva gives him a relentless amount of grief.

== Production ==
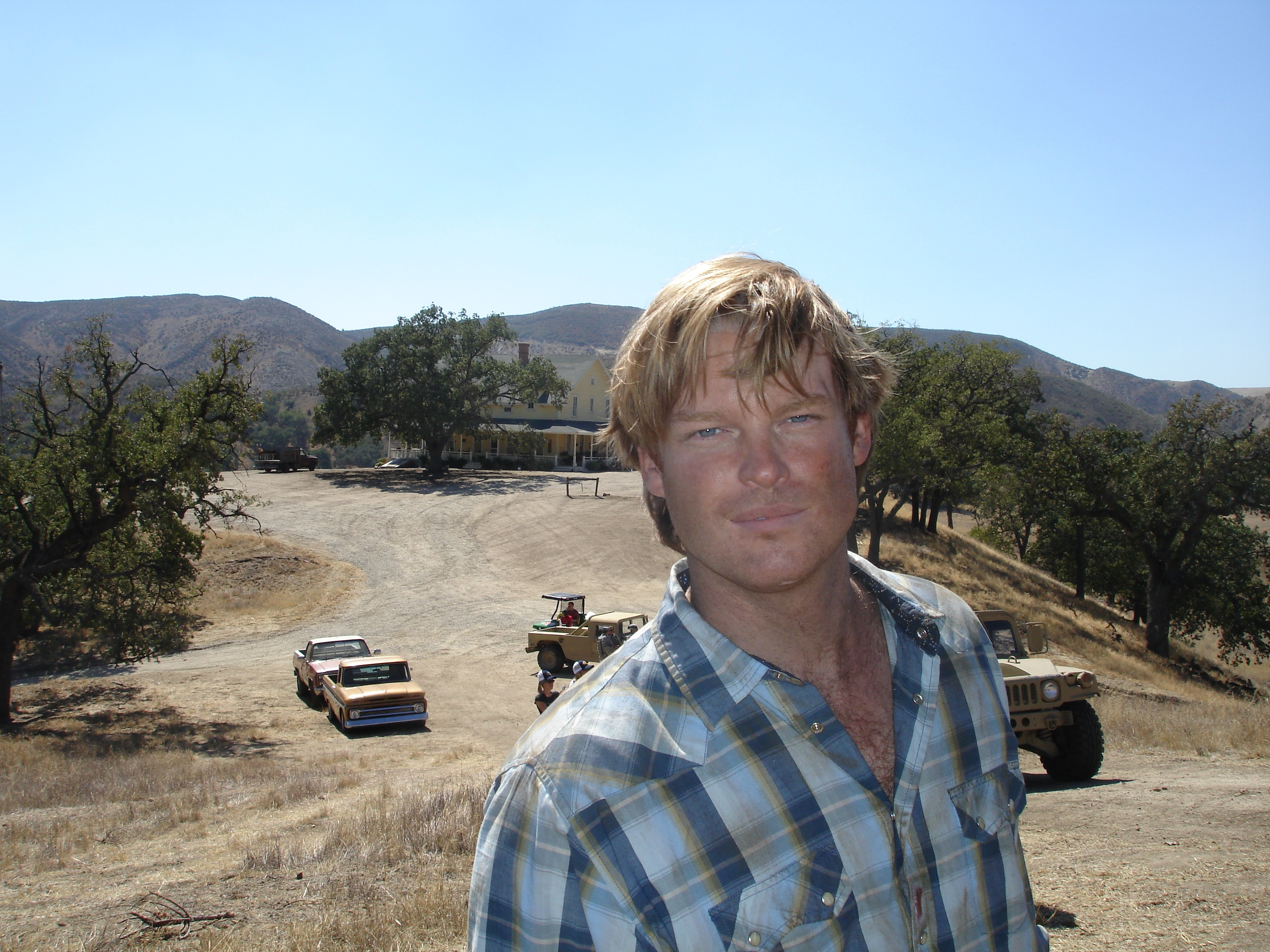
Brad Beyer guest starred as Marine Captain Joe Westcott, a marine with posttraumatic stress disorder.

"Shell Shock (Part I)" is written by Nichole Mirante-Matthews and directed by Leslie Libman. The episode is a tribute to "all of our brave men and women overseas, as well as our veterans here at home", Mirante-Matthews said. The theme of the episode is posttraumatic stress disorder (PTSD), and showrunner Gary Glasberg gave Mirante-Matthews (Part I) and Gina Lucita Monreal (Part II) the task of writing the two-part story arc in May 2012. The writers had to use "several weeks of research and conversation" to get enough information about PTSD and its effect on people in the military.

On September 13, 2012, TV Guide announced that Brad Beyer would guest star as Marine Captain Joe Westcott, who "shows signs of post-traumatic stress disorder". Together with Beyer, Glen Powell was cast to portray Westcott's brother Luke and Mark Rolston as their father George.

== Reception ==
"Shell Shock (Part I)" was seen by 17.05 million live viewers following its broadcast on November 13, 2012, with a 3.1/9 share among adults aged 18 to 49. A rating point represents one percent of the total number of television sets in American households, and a share means the percentage of television sets in use tuned to the program. In total viewers, "Shell Shock (Part I)" easily won NCIS and CBS the night. The spin-off NCIS: Los Angeles drew second and was seen by 15.77 million viewers. Compared to the last episode "Namesake", "Shell Shock (Part I)" was down in both viewers and adults 18-49.

Carla Day from TV Fanatic gave the episode 4.5 (out of 5) and stated that "[the episode] started out as a fairly routine NCIS case when a marine, Michael Torres, was found beaten to death in an alley. The investigation became more complicated when his fellow marine's story didn't check out and Gibbs figured out he was suffering from PTSD. That was a compelling story, but NCIS ended with a surprise that blew the top off the entire mystery."
