= Kimberly-Rose Wolter =

American screenwriter

Kimberly-Rose Ka'iulani Wolter is a Native-Hawaiian screenwriter. She is currently based in Los Angeles.

== Television ==
Wolter spent two years writing for the top-rated crime drama NCIS. She has developed projects with Taika Waititi (Jojo Rabbit), The Jaquemettons (MadMen), Stephanie Allain (Dear White People), John Strauss (There's Something About Mary), and Jessie Collins Entertainment. She has worked with Netflix, DreamWorks, Amazon, CBS, and MGM, as well as PowderKeg and Seven Bucks in the first all-Pasifika writers’ room. In 2019 and 2020, she was named to the CAPExBlackList and was named to the WeForShe List in 2019.

== Miss Happy Mess the Podcast ==
In 2026, Wolter began hosting and executive producing the Miss Happy Mess the Podcast, a talk podcast focused on issues affecting women, including reinvention, self-identity, parenting, relationships, and practical aspects of adult life. Episodes feature conversations with prominent women, emphasizing candid discussion, community, and support, and are influenced by Hawaiian culture and values.

== Film ==
Wolter has written and starred in two feature films, 2003's Tre, which won the Special Jury Prize at the 2007 San Francisco International Asian American Film Festival and Knots, released in 2011. She had a role in Eric Byler's 2002 feature Charlotte Sometimes and starred in 2010's Strangers. She played a nurse in the 2011 feature film Soul Surfer.

== Theatre ==
Wolter co-founded VS. Theatre Company (pronounced "versus") in 2003.

The company's first production, the West Coast premiere of "The Credeaux Canvas" in which Wolter starred as 'Amelia', was widely praised earning the Los Angeles Times "Critics Choice" who said "The performances are rich, spontaneous, and often side-splittingly funny". It was followed by acclaimed productions of John Corwin's "Navy Pier" and John Patrick Shanley's "Beggars in the House of Plenty".

== Production ==
In 2007 Wolter and VS. Theatre's co-production with The Elephant Theatre Company of "In Arabia We'd all be Kings" was named "Best Production" by the Los Angeles Drama Critic's Circle.

Wolter followed that by co-producing a 2008 staging of John Kolvenbach's "On An Average Day" which earned the Los Angeles Times "Critics Choice", Backstage West's "Critics Pick" and was described as "...searing ...a tour de force" by Variety. The success of the production led to a transfer to Chicago where Wolter's Los Angeles cast reprised their roles in a joint venture with the 'Route 66 Theatre Company'. A complimentary review in the Chicago Tribune noted the casts "...quality."

On March 19, 2011, Wolter's production of the West coast premiere of Neil LaBute's "The Mercy Seat" opened in Los Angeles. She wrote and published a short animated promotional clip to support the production.

== Directing ==
Wolter directed a public service announcement in 2010 which featured children encouraging adults to vote.

== Commercials, voiceover and promotion ==
In 2007 Wolter provided a voiceover for a video in support of Proposition 121. In 2010 Wolter appeared in a Michelob Ultra commercial with Lance Armstrong and in 2011 she was featured in a Hershey's 'Smores' ad. Wolter regularly appears on stage at E3 for Microsoft and has also worked as a spokesmodel for Palm.
