= Till Death Do Us Part (NCIS) =

- NCIS episode
- Episode no.: Season 9 Episode 24
- Directed by: Tony Wharmby
- Written by: Gary Glasberg
- Original air date: May 15, 2012

Guest appearances
- Brian Dietzen as Jimmy Palmer; Jamie Lee Curtis as Samantha Ryan; Scott Wolf as Jonathan Cole; Richard Schiff as Harper Dearing; Michelle Pierce as Breena Slater; Sheila Kelley as Victoria Dearing; Daniel Polo as Parker Ryan; Cassius Willis as NCIS Special Agent Russell Wallace; Debbie Jaffee as Waitress

Episode chronology
← Previous "Up in Smoke"	Next → "Extreme Prejudice"
- NCIS season 9

"Till Death Do Us Part" is the 24th and final episode of the ninth season of the American police procedural drama NCIS, and the 210th episode overall. It originally aired on CBS in the United States on May 15, 2012. The episode is written by Gary Glasberg and directed by Tony Wharmby, and was seen by 19.05 million viewers.

In the episode, NCIS is threatened by terrorism while Jimmy Palmer's wedding occurs.

== Plot ==
With Director Leon Vance reported missing, the NCIS team is called out to where his car has been found unoccupied. After investigating Vance's car, the team locates Vance at a family plot where Vance finds himself in a crypt, next to the body of a sailor killed in the same incident as the son of industrialist-turned-terrorist Harper Dearing. After picking him up, the team finds another message with a horse jaw that leads them to a retired NCIS agent who handled a case that sent Dearing's son to the destroyer that claimed his life. However, Dearing blows up the agent's house and leaves them a videotaped message, soon confronting Pentagon profiler Dr. Samantha Ryan by threatening her son and forcing her to flee when he buys out a judge to release her ex-husband on a technicality. Meanwhile, Jimmy is nervous on whether or not to go through with the marriage with everything going on and with no one else being able to attend, but Ducky tells him to go through with it, and that he will join him. However, Jimmy asks Breena to advance the wedding so he could return to assist with the case and so his friends could be there.

Gibbs decides to recruit convicted former officer Jonathan Cole based on Ryan's profiling of Dearing to lure him into a trap. It initially seems to have worked when Dearing tells Cole to meet him a cafe retired Navy officers attend, but Dearing doesn't show up to the meeting and instead leaves a phone for Cole. The former calls and tells Cole to relay a message to Gibbs that he was never interested in Director Vance and is really interested in justice. Back at headquarters, analyzing the call makes the team realize there is a bomb in Vance's car, installed when he was abducted, meant to blow up NCIS Headquarters at the Navy Yard and the whole building is evacuated. Cole attempts to defuse the bomb but is killed in the process (assumed), when the bomb detonates, while receiving a phone call indicating the bomb was for revenge against the Navy due to the death of his son, Evan, (revealed in "Up in Smoke") damaging part of the NCIS building with Gibbs and his team still inside. While walking alone on a beach, Ducky receives a phone call about the bombing and is asked to autopsy the bodies, but the shock and stress of the call causes him to suffer a heart attack and collapse, leaving everyone's fates unknown.

== Production ==
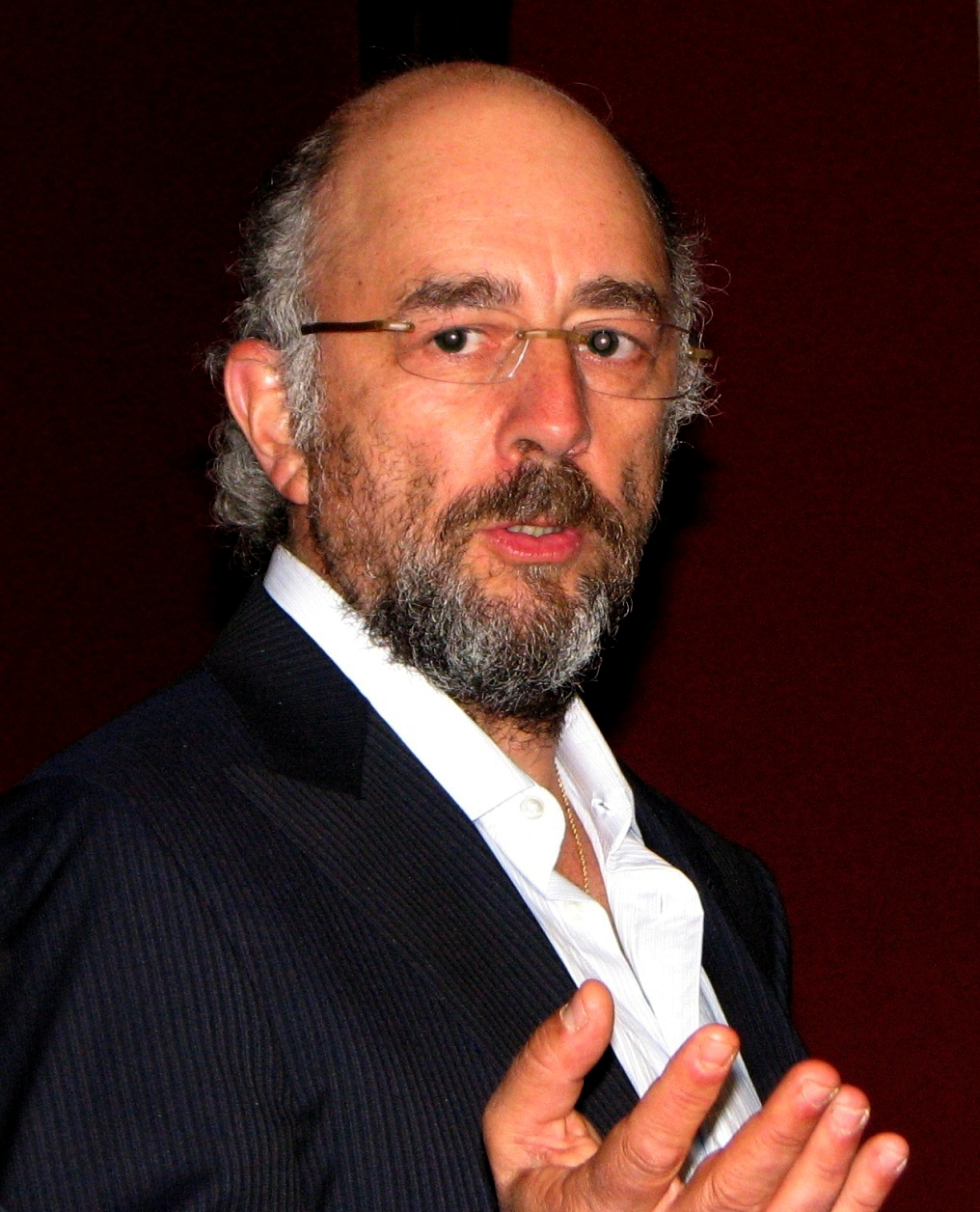
Richard Schiff guest starred as the terrorist Harper Dearing.

"Till Death Do Us Part" is written by Gary Glasberg and directed by Tony Wharmby. The ninth season ended dramatically, with many unknown fates. According to Glasberg, "NCIS has historically [...] done these end arcs or established a villain that carries through for a few episodes, and this one is really no different in that respect. The one difference in the approach in this season was we wanted to deliver a true cliffhanger". The ending scene with Ducky's heart attack was planned for a long time. "David [McCallum] and I have been talking about it for months, and he’s been preparing for it [...], and it’s really going to give his character a new perspective on life coming back from what he experienced."

Along with Ducky, the rest of the team could be in danger after the explosion, while the terrorist Harper Dearing (Richard Schiff) still is on the loose. "We know how important the NCIS family is to [the fans]. Yes, we literally just shook the foundation of NCIS. But Special Agent Leroy Jethro Gibbs would be the first to say, 'Nobody touches my family', Harper Dearing is still out there." Also Dr. Ryan (Jamie Lee Curtis) became affected by Dearing and fled to protect her son, making her further appearance on the show unknown. "That was very much a goodbye that happened between Ryan and Gibbs, and we’ll have to see how things unfold when we might be able to see her again."

A lot of characters are recurring in the episode: Brian Dietzen (as Jimmy Palmer), Jamie Lee Curtis (as Dr. Samantha Ryan), Richard Schiff (as Harper Dearing), Michelle Pierce (as Breena Slater), and Scott Wolf (as Jonathan Cole).

== Reception ==
"Till Death Do Us Part" was seen by 19.05 million live viewers following its broadcast on May 15, 2012, with a 12/20 share among all households, and 3.6/11 share among adults aged 18 to 49. A rating point represents one percent of the total number of television sets in American households, and a share means the percentage of television sets in use tuned to the program. In total viewers, "Till Death Do Us Part" easily won NCIS and CBS the night. The spin-off NCIS: Los Angeles drew second and was seen by 15.19 million viewers. The episode also was the most watched television program the week it aired. Compared to last week's episode "Up In Smoke", "Till Death Do Us Part" was up a bit in both viewers and adults 18-49.

Steve Marsi from TV Fanatic gave the episode 4.5 (out of 5) and stated that "this may not have been the best NCIS season finale, but its ending will surely go down as one of the most talked about. The final two minutes, as advertised, rocked the very foundation of the show. "Til Death Do Us Part" had some flaws, but the entire season-ending arc was first-rate, with terrific performances by the cast members tonight in particular and a cliffhanger that left us on the edge of our collective seat and with much to discuss in the months ahead as we await the start of Season 10".
