= NCIS season 9 =

Season of television series

NCIS
- Season 9
- Season 9 U.S. DVD cover
- Starring: Mark Harmon; Michael Weatherly; Cote de Pablo; Pauley Perrette; Sean Murray; Rocky Carroll; David McCallum
- No. of episodes: 24

Release
- Original network: CBS
- Original release: September 20, 2011 – May 15, 2012

Season chronology
- ← Previous; Season 8 Next → Season 10

The ninth season of NCIS, an American police procedural drama, originally aired on CBS from September 20, 2011, through May 15, 2012.

== Cast and characters ==
=== Main ===
- Mark Harmon as Leroy Jethro Gibbs, NCIS Supervisory Special Agent (SSA) of the Major Case Response Team (MCRT) assigned to Washington's Navy Yard
- Michael Weatherly as Anthony DiNozzo, NCIS Senior Special Agent, Second in Command of MCRT
- Cote de Pablo as Ziva David, NCIS Junior Special Agent
- Pauley Perrette as Abby Sciuto, Forensic Specialist for NCIS
- Sean Murray as Timothy McGee, NCIS Special Agent
- Rocky Carroll as Leon Vance, NCIS Director
- David McCallum as Dr. Donald "Ducky" Mallard, Chief Medical Examiner for NCIS

=== Also starring ===
- Brian Dietzen as Jimmy Palmer, Assistant Medical Examiner for NCIS

=== Recurring ===
- Philip Casnoff as Sean Latham, NCIS target
- Wendy Makkena as Dr. Rachel Cranston, a psychiatrist and Caitlin Todd's sister
- Sarah Jane Morris as E.J. Barrett, NCIS Senior Special Agent
- Matt Willig as Simon Cade, NCIS Special Agent
- Matt Craven as Clayton Jarvis, Secretary of the Navy
- Scott Wolf as Casey Stratton, NCIS target
- Jack Conley as Danny Sportelli, Metro P.D. Detective
- Diane Neal as Abigail Borin, CGIS Special Agent in Charge
- Daniel Louis Rivas as Kyle Davis, Abby's brother
- Joe Spano as Tobias Fornell, FBI Senior Special Agent
- Melinda McGraw as Diane Sterling, Gibbs' and Fornell's ex-wife
- John Finn as Gen. Charles T. Ellison, retired Commandant of the Marine Corps
- Meredith Eaton as Carol Wilson, immunologist and a friend of Abby Sciuto
- Matt L. Jones as Ned Dorneget, NCIS Probationary Special Agent
- Robert Wagner as Anthony DiNozzo, Sr., Tony's father
- Enrique Murciano as Ray Cruz, rogue CIA Agent
- Michelle Pierce as Breena Slater, Jimmy Palmer's fiancée
- Larry Miller as Ed Slater, Breena's father and Palmer's soon-to-be father-in-law
- Darby Stanchfield as Shannon Gibbs, Gibbs' deceased wife
- Sam Schuder as Kelly Gibbs, Gibbs' deceased daughter
- Michael O'Neill as Riley McCallister, retired Senior Special Agent for NCIS
- Ralph Waite as Jackson Gibbs, Gibbs' father
- Jamie Lee Curtis as Dr. Samantha Ryan, head of DoD PsyOps Division
- Tamer Hassan as Agah Bayar, NCIS target
- Paula Newsome as Jackie Vance, Leon Vance's wife
- Akinsola Aribo as Jared Vance, Leon Vance's son
- Kiara Muhammad as Kayla Vance, Leon Vance's daughter
- Richard Schiff as Harper Dearing, NCIS target
- Joel Gretsch as Stan Burley, NCIS Special Agent Afloat on the USS Benjamin Franklin and former member of Gibbs' team

=== Guests ===
- Lily Tomlin as Penelope Langston, McGee's grandmother
- Shohreh Aghdashloo as Mariam Bawali, Lebanese asylum seeker
- Sasha Alexander as Caitlin Todd, deceased NCIS Special Agent who was killed by Ari Haswari
- Tim Kelleher as Chris Pacci, deceased NCIS Special Agent
- Rudolf Martin as Ari Haswari, deceased rogue Mossad Agent who killed Caitlin Todd
- Muse Watson as Mike Franks, deceased retired Senior Special Agent for NCIS and Gibbs' former boss
- Lauren Holly as Jenny Shepard, deceased NCIS Director
- Sean Astin as Tyler Elliott
- Michael Kelly as Jim Porter, NCIS Special Agent, second in command in San Diego
- Cheryl Ladd as Dr. Mary Courtney

== Episodes ==
No. overall	No. in season	Title	Directed by	Written by	Original release date	Prod. code	U.S. viewers (millions)
187	1	"Nature of the Beast"	Tony Wharmby	Gary Glasberg	September 20, 2011	903	19.96
Tony is shot and unable to remember what it was all about. He must work together with Gibbs and Dr. Cranston to identify the attacker. Ziva is promoted to Special Agent.
188	2	"Restless"	James Whitmore Jr.	Steven D. Binder	September 27, 2011	902	19.51
A Marine named Thomas Hill collapses at his homecoming party, having been drugged and stabbed before arriving. As the NCIS team start digging through his past, they discover Hill's adopted younger sister is a twenty-seven-year-old serial con-artist who runs away from her foster families shortly before her "eighteenth" birthday and has a dark secret behind her scam. Meanwhile, Tony begins to feel remorse for schoolyard bullying during his time at boarding school and enlists McGee's help in making amends. However, by the end of the episode, it is revealed that Tony was the victim of bullying and not the perpetrator.
189	3	"The Penelope Papers"	Arvin Brown	Nicole Mirante-Matthews	October 4, 2011	901	19.35
NCIS is assigned the case of Paul Booth, a Navy lieutenant who is shot dead in a park after talking to his pregnant wife. Booth is revealed to have been a friend of McGee's maternal grandmother, Penelope Langston, who developed a research project for the military known as the ANAX Principle before the outbreak of the Vietnam War shut down for four decades before being restarted. During the case, McGee and his grandmother speak of how Gibbs reminds them of McGee's father. McGee ultimately decides to call his dad whom he hasn't spoken to in seven years. Meanwhile, Jimmy Palmer struggles with plans for his upcoming wedding.
190	4	"Enemy on the Hill"	Dennis Smith	George Schenck & Frank Cardea	October 11, 2011	904	18.98
The NCIS team must protect a Navy Lt. Cmdr. when they discover an assassin is trying to kill him. Abby decides to donate her kidney.
191	5	"Safe Harbor"	Terrence O'Hara	Reed Steiner & Christopher J. Waild	October 18, 2011	905	19.41
Abigail Borin returns to NCIS when a U.S. Coast Guard Petty Officer, Cooper, is shot while inspecting an incoming vessel. The NCIS team discover that a Lebanese family seeking asylum has stowed away on the boat. As Ziva begins to bond with the family, evidence emerges that Cooper was shot with ammunition sold to the Lebanese government, and Gibbs begins to suspect a political connection. Meanwhile, concerned that he is lonely, the team tries to find the perfect girlfriend for Gibbs, but once they decide on a candidate, Gibbs revealed that he had already dated her, but broke up because "perfect is boring".
192	6	"Thirst"	Thomas J. Wright	Scott Williams	October 25, 2011	906	19.43
An NCIS case changes from accidental death to murder when evidence reveals that a Navy lieutenant died of forced over-hydration. The team discovered that the victim, Jason Simms, had been drugged with ecstasy, causing severe dehydration; this led him to over-hydrate, causing water toxification. When a second victim, Alcott, is found bound to a tree and also dead by way of water toxification, NCIS realize that both Simms and Alcott had failed marriages, and had been members of outreach programs and targeted by a serial killer. Meanwhile, Gibbs meets Ducky's new love interest, Mary (Cheryl Ladd), a woman he met online. McGee realizes that Mary is connected to the same program as Jason and Alcott, and is responsible for their deaths. Mary explains to Ducky that she chose this method of murder because he had said he had "seen it all" in his job and she thought he would appreciate an interesting and novel case. Ducky is disturbed by his misplaced judgement of her, feeling guilty that he did not see her deception sooner.
193	7	"Devil's Triangle"	Leslie Libman	Steven D. Binder & Reed Steiner	November 1, 2011	907	19.71
Gibbs and Fornell are approached by their mutual ex-wife, Diane, when her current husband disappears under suspicious circumstances. The case causes a stir within the NCIS team and they all attempt to find out about Gibbs' past life, much to his irritation.
194	8	"Engaged"	James Whitmore Jr.	Gina Lucita Monreal	November 8, 2011	908	20.38
195	9	"Engaged"	Tony Wharmby	Gary Glasberg	November 15, 2011	909	20.00
Part I: A C-130 carrying the bodies of Marines killed in Afghanistan crashes, stretching the team to the maximum as they are given twenty-four hours to identify the bodies before they are released to their families. Complications arise when one of the bodies cannot be identified, and 1st Lt Gabriella Flores, a Marine who was supposedly killed in an attack on a local school-building project, remains unaccounted for. Accessing satellite footage of the bombing, the team realize that Flores is still alive, having tried to save two young girls – but moments later was captured by insurgents. McGee and Abby deduce that some of the teachers in Flores' school-building project are actually female insurgents and Taliban-sympathizers sent undercover by a small but highly organized terrorist cell to infiltrate the school. The episode ends with NCIS preparing a rescue mission to save Flores. The case affects the team on a more personal level, especially Gibbs, who reminisces about his time in the Marine Corps, while Tony reflects on the shortness of life. Part II: Gibbs and Ziva travel to Afghanistan in search of Gabriella Flores. After talking with the two girls that she rescued from the school attack, Flores is successfully rescued, but her commanding officer is killed in the process. Back in Washington, Tony discovers that the woman who held Flores hostage has a brother, a university student based locally, and both are members of the same terrorist group. The team continue interrogating the siblings but to no avail. Gibbs, with some help from Vance, takes matters into his own hands as the team races against time to find out the terrorists' next move. DiNozzo attempts to conquer one of his phobias while Gibbs relives a painful memory from his days as a young recruit.
196	10	"Sins of the Father"	Arvin Brown	George Schenck & Frank Cardea	November 22, 2011	910	18.49
Tony's father awakes to find a dead body in car trunk and has no memory of the previous night. Tony is sidelined during the investigation, much to his annoyance. After clearing DiNozzo Sr., the team must find out who drugged him and why. The episode ends with both DiNozzos spending Thanksgiving at Gibbs' house.
197	11	"Newborn King"	Dennis Smith	Christopher J. Waild	December 13, 2011	911	19.13
When a Navy captain is killed in a hotel room, NCIS must track down and protect his very pregnant companion from unknown assailants. Meanwhile, Jimmy is frustrated by his difficult future father-in-law.
198	12	"Housekeeping"	Terrence O’Hara	Scott Williams	January 3, 2012	912	19.81
The investigation of a Navy Commander's murder leads the team to E.J. Barrett to reopen their investigation into the fake FBI Agent Stratton, who attempted to kill E.J. and DiNozzo months prior (in "Nature of the Beast").
199	13	"A Desperate Man"	Leslie Libman	Nicole Mirante-Matthews	January 10, 2012	913	21.03
NCIS investigates the death of a Navy lieutenant commander whose body was found at a loft that was under renovation.
200	14	"Life Before His Eyes"	Tony Wharmby	Gary Glasberg	February 7, 2012	914	20.98
During a routine stop in a diner for his morning coffee, Gibbs finds himself shot. He then suddenly finds himself inside a spectral version of the diner where he sees various characters from the past and present, both living and dead.
201	15	"Secrets"	Leslie Libman	Steven D. Binder	February 14, 2012	915	19.59
When a Navy Captain is found dead with an unusual costume under his uniform, Tony must work with his ex-fiancée to find the killer.
202	16	"Psych Out"	Dennis Smith	Teleplay by : Reed Steiner; Story by : Gary Glasberg & Reed Steiner	February 21, 2012	916	19.29
Dr. Robert Banks, a prominent Navy psychologist, is found dead from an apparent suicide. Gibbs and his team look into the world of psychological warfare when Dr. Samantha Ryan, the head of PsyOps, refuses to answer questions or release information to aid the case.
203	17	"Need to Know"	Michelle MacLaren	George Schenck & Frank Cardea	February 28, 2012	917	18.20
When Chief Petty Officer Wiley is murdered before he can divulge information about infamous arms dealer Agah Bayar, Gibbs is immediately on the case.
204	18	"The Tell"	Thomas J. Wright	Gina Lucita Monreal	March 20, 2012	918	19.05
When a shooting occurs at a seminar on Gibbs' and Tony's watch, Gibbs must work together with both Secretary of the Navy (Matt Craven) and Dr. Samantha Ryan (Jamie Lee Curtis) to find out who leaked top secret information and McGee must pit his wits against an elusive and cunning hacker.
205	19	"The Good Son"	Terrence O'Hara	Nicole Mirante-Matthews & Scott Williams	March 27, 2012	919	18.67
During the investigation into a petty Officer's death, the team is led to Director Vance's Brother-in-law.
206	20	"The Missionary Position"	Arvin Brown	Allison Abner	April 10, 2012	920	17.66
After the corpse of a Marine lieutenant falls out of the sky, Tony helps Ziva and her mentor, Monique, look for a missing Navy Chaplain in Colombia. Jimmy Palmer chooses his best man for the wedding.
207	21	"Rekindled"	Mark Horowitz	Christopher J. Waild & Reed Steiner	April 17, 2012	921	18.08
Part 1 of 5 : NCIS is called in when the Baltimore Fire Department discovers a stack of classified Navy documents next to a skeleton after putting out a warehouse fire. Tony, a former Baltimore PD detective, returns to his former stomping ground and unexpectedly reunites with someone from his past.
208	22	"Playing with Fire"	Dennis Smith	George Schenck & Frank Cardea	May 1, 2012	922	17.58
Part 2 of 5 : In the aftermath of the arson attack aboard the USS Brewer (in "Rekindled"), the NCIS team discovers evidence of it being caused by the same arson explosive from earlier.
209	23	"Up in Smoke"	James Whitmore Jr.	Steven D. Binder	May 8, 2012	923	18.20
Part 3 of 5 : When a bug is found in Probationary Agent Ned Dorneget's tooth, the team goes full force in the effort to arrest Harper Dearing.
210	24	"Till Death Do Us Part"	Tony Wharmby	Gary Glasberg	May 15, 2012	924	19.05
Part 4 of 5 : Jimmy Palmer's wedding plans are derailed when he and his co-workers at NCIS are threatened by terrorism.

== Production ==
=== Development ===
NCIS was renewed for a ninth season on February 2, 2011.

== Reception ==
NCIS ranked #3 with a total of 19.49 million viewers for the 2011–12 U.S. television season.

=== Ratings ===
Viewership and ratings per episode of NCIS season 9
No.	Title	Air date	Rating/share (18–49)	Viewers (millions)	DVR (18–49)	DVR viewers (millions)	Total (18–49)	Total viewers (millions)
1	"Nature of the Beast"	September 20, 2011	4.3/12	19.96	1.2	3.35	5.5	23.31
2	"Restless"	September 27, 2011	4.2/12	19.51	1.2	3.25	5.4	22.76
3	"The Penelope Papers"	October 4, 2011	4.2/12	19.35	1.0	3.01	5.2	22.36
4	"Enemy on the Hill"	October 11, 2011	4.0/11	18.98	1.1	2.84	5.1	21.82
5	"Safe Harbor"	October 18, 2011	3.9/11	19.41	1.1	2.77	5.0	22.18
6	"Thirst"	October 25, 2011	4.1/12	19.43	1.1	2.96	5.2	22.39
7	"Devil's Triangle"	November 1, 2011	3.9/11	19.71	1.0	2.97	4.9	22.68
8	"Engaged (Part I)"	November 8, 2011	4.1/11	20.38	1.0	2.79	5.1	23.17
9	"Engaged (Part II)"	November 15, 2011	4.0/11	20.00	1.1	2.97	5.1	22.97
10	"Sins of the Father"	November 22, 2011	3.5/10	18.49	1.3	3.68	4.8	22.17
11	"Newborn King"	December 13, 2011	3.6/10	19.13	1.1	3.40	4.7	22.53
12	"Housekeeping"	January 3, 2012	4.1/11	19.81	1.2	3.34	5.3	23.15
13	"A Desperate Man"	January 10, 2012	4.1/11	21.03	1.2	3.13	5.3	24.16
14	"Life Before His Eyes"	February 7, 2012	4.2/11	20.98	1.2	3.67	5.4	24.65
15	"Secrets"	February 14, 2012	3.9/11	19.59	1.1	3.38	5.0	22.97
16	"Psych Out"	February 21, 2012	3.6/10	19.29	1.3	3.60	4.9	22.89
17	"Need To Know"	February 28, 2012	3.5/9	18.20	1.1	3.41	4.6	21.61
18	"The Tell"	March 20, 2012	3.4/10	19.05	0.9	2.96	4.3	22.01
19	"The Good Son"	March 27, 2012	3.5/10	18.67	0.8	2.67	4.3	21.34
20	"The Missionary Position"	April 10, 2012	3.1/9	17.66	1.1	3.01	4.2	20.67
21	"Rekindled"	April 17, 2012	3.0/9	18.08	1.1	3.17	4.1	21.25
22	"Playing with Fire"	May 1, 2012	3.1/10	17.58	1.0	2.99	4.1	20.57
23	"Up in Smoke"	May 8, 2012	3.1/10	18.20	1.1	2.96	4.2	21.16
24	"Till Death Do Us Part"	May 15, 2012	3.6/11	19.05	1.1	3.15	4.7	22.20

== DVD special features ==
- Nine Is Fine - The NCIS cast and crew discuss Season 9.
- The Finish Line - A behind-the-scenes feature of the post-production of NCIS Season 9 which shows how an episode is put together.
- Casting Off - Casting Directors Susan Bluestein and Jason Kennedy as well as the NCIS cast discuss the casting of various characters in NCIS Season 9.
- Episode Two Hundred - The NCIS cast and crew celebrate the 200th episode, "Life Before His Eyes".
- NCIS Season 9 Cast Roundtable - The NCIS cast discuss NCIS Season 9 and answer questions from the fans.
- Psyched Up: Jamie Lee Curtis on Set - The NCIS cast and crew discuss getting actress Jamie Lee Curtis for a few episodes of NCIS Season 9.
- Cast and Crew Commentaries on Selected Episodes (Region 1 and 2): Commentary on "Housekeeping" with Michael Weatherly and Cote de Pablo, Commentary on "Life Before His Eyes" with Mark Harmon, Gary Glasberg and Tony Wharmby. Commentary on "Rekindled" with Michael Weatherly and Mark Horowitz. Commentary on "Up in Smoke" with Brian Dietzen, Matt Jones and Steven D. Binder.
- Deleted Scene (Region 1 and 2 only).
