= Rekindled =

- NCIS episode
- Episode no.: Season 9 Episode 21
- Directed by: Mark Horowitz
- Written by: Christopher J. Waild & Reed Steiner
- Original air date: April 17, 2012

Guest appearances
- Gaius Charles as Baltimore Detective Jason King; Peter Kelamis as Bruce Johnson; Peter MacKenzie as Jack Murdoch; James Hanlon as Baltimore Fire Captain James Marsh; Patrick Stafford as Billy Wayne; Louise Griffiths as Mary Gardocki; Michael Lesly as Fireman #1; Dani Dare as Young Jason

Episode chronology
← Previous "The Missionary Position"	Next → "Playing with Fire"
- NCIS season 9

"Rekindled" is the 21st episode of the ninth season of the American police procedural drama NCIS, and the 207th episode overall. It aired on CBS in the United States on April 17, 2012. The episode is written by Christopher J. Waild and Reed Steiner and directed by Mark Horowitz, and was seen by 18.08 million viewers.

== Plot ==
The NCIS team deal with an arsonist, which has links to the mysterious Watcher Fleet. While investigating, they team up with Jason King, an arson investigator with the Baltimore Police Department. They find that the arson was to cover up the theft of a top secret Navy file codenamed "Aquamarine". When a second fire occurs on board a cargo ship, the team goes to investigate, and Jason saves Tony's life after accidentally setting off a booby trap. Closer investigation reveals that the ship contained faulty wiring that could cause the entire ship to explode under the right conditions.

When they finally track down the arsonist, he admits that he was hired to steal the file, but is killed by a car bomb before he can reveal who hired him. The team recovers the stolen files, and finds out that Aquamarine was a list of Navy ships that had been installed with the faulty wiring. The Watcher Fleet so far had only been able to retrofit a third of the affected ships.

Throughout the episode, Jason works closely with the rest of the NCIS team, but he and Tony are uncomfortable around each other. Tony eventually explains why to Ziva and McGee: when he was a senior in college, his basketball team was in Baltimore for a game; while out for a walk, he saw a building on fire and rushed inside. He saved Jason, but Jason's younger sister was trapped by debris, and Tony was forced to leave her behind to save Jason, who has resented him ever since. As Jason is leaving NCIS, Tony sets the record straight, telling him that he had to make a choice, and that rescuing him was his inspiration to become a police officer.

Gibbs puts out a warning to the Navy, but the U.S.S. Brewer still falls victim to an arson attack.

== Production ==
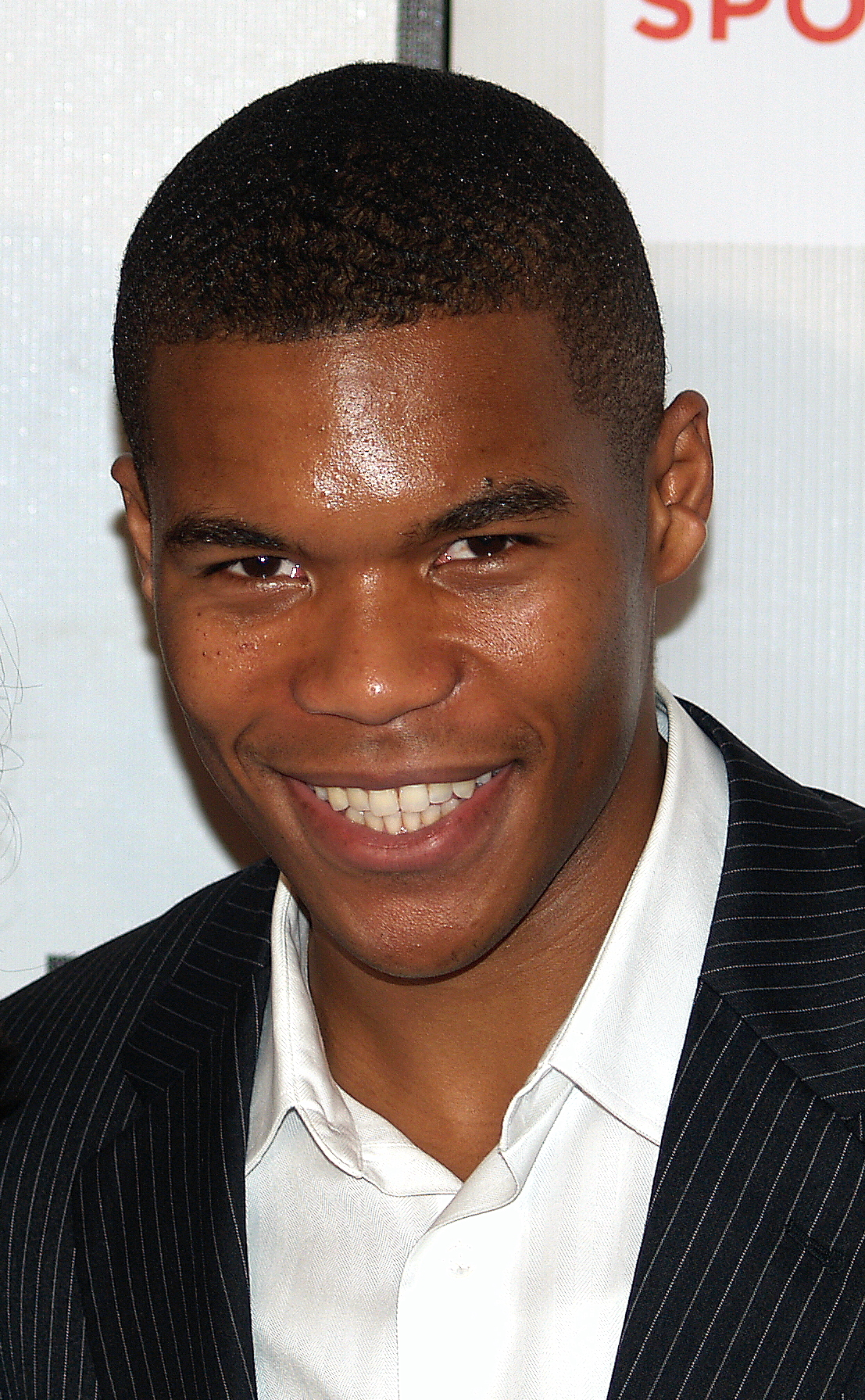
Gaius Charles guest starred as Tony's "kid in Baltimore", Jason King.

"Rekindled" is written by Christopher J. Waild & Reed Steiner and directed by Mark Horowitz. The writers wanted to do "a fire episode", which never before had been done on NCIS. "'Hey, how about a fire episode?' With those words, we started the ball rolling on what would end up as Episode #207 of NCIS. And yet, with all the pyrotechnics, firebombs, and various other "fire elements" on our show, we’d never done a traditional arson story". The NCIS budget available can usually only handle one "high-temp conflagration" per episode, the writers said.

Video footage taken from the "Better to End with a Bang" segment of MythBusters episode #113, in which Jamie Hyneman and Adam Savage attempt to cut an SUV in half using a thousand pounds of thermite, is seen on the monitor in Abby's lab to compliment her explanation of how thermite functions.

The episode centers around Tony and his "kid in Baltimore", Jason King (portrayed by Gaius Charles). The "kid" has been mentioned in numerous episodes before, including "A Man Walks Into a Bar..." and "Nature of the Beast". In this episode, the writers told the story between Tony and the "kid", a story going back over 20 years, but never explained before. "[...] the fire "stuff" worked fantastically, which allowed us to tell the FULL story behind the kid Tony "almost lost in Baltimore." A story often hinted at – but never fully explained".

"Rekindled" also marked the start of the ending arch in season 9, with the return of "The Phantom Eight", last seen in "Housekeeping", and introduced in the season premiere "Nature of the Beast".

== Reception ==
"Rekindled" was seen by 18.08 million live viewers following its broadcast on April 17, 2012, with an 11.2/18 share among all households, and 3.1/9 share among adults aged 18 to 49. A rating point represents one percent of the total number of television sets in American households, and a share means the percentage of television sets in use tuned to the program. In total viewers, "Rekindled" easily won NCIS and CBS the night. Compared to last week's episode "The Missionary Position", "Rekindled" was up a bit in viewers and even in adults 18-49.

Steve Marsi from TV Fanatic gave the episode 5 (out of 5) and stated "now that was a first-rate episode of NCIS. "Rekindled" was a fitting title for an installment in which Tony crossed paths with a boy who changed his life forever and vice versa, and we were reintroduced to the mysterious Phantom Eight. This is how you do an "origin" episode and develop characters. Rather than simply having a guest star randomly tell us something about DiNozzo, he relived the past while working with Jason King in the present".
