= Secrets (NCIS) =

- NCIS episode
- Episode no.: Season 9 Episode 15
- Directed by: Leslie Libman
- Written by: Steven D. Binder
- Original air date: February 14, 2012

Guest appearances
- Perrey Reeves as Wendy Miller; Ray Wise as Wayne Tobett; Kevin Christy as Clarence Tobett; Allison McAtee as Spandaxia; Joe Holt as Navy Captain Jack Wallace; Steven W. Bailey as Dexter Murphy; Lombardo Boyar as Felix Quintero; Shannon McClung as Boltcutter; Will Deutsch as Smaller Guy; Riley Thomas as Stewart Fred Miller; Tom Lind as Tom Ventura

Episode chronology
← Previous "Life Before His Eyes"	Next → "Psych Out"
- NCIS season 9

"Secrets" is the 15th episode of the ninth season of the American crime drama television series NCIS, and the 201st episode overall. It originally aired on CBS in the United States on February 14, 2012. The episode is written by Steven D. Binder and directed by Leslie Libman, and was seen by 19.59 million viewers.

In the episode, a Navy Captain is found dead with an unusual costume under his uniform, and Tony DiNozzo (Michael Weatherly) must work with his ex-fiancée to solve the case.

== Plot ==
U.S. Navy Captain Jack Wallace and his friend Dexter Murphy are shot dead in Murphy's Washington, D.C. flower shop. Both men had ornate costumes under their clothes, revealing them to be participants in the real-life superhero community (community activists whose activities sometimes extend into vigilantism). Shortly before his death, Wallace called reporter Wendy Miller, who agrees not to publish a story that might embarrass the Navy, in exchange for access to NCIS' investigation. Gibbs, who is known for disliking reporters, intentionally makes a very reluctant Tony the official liaison with Miller, who happens to be his ex-fiancée; they have not spoken since she broke off their engagement nine years earlier, and he rejected her invitation to Christmas brunch in the episode "Newborn King".

A failed assassination attempt on Wendy's life leads the team to believe that the case involves one of her stories. When Ducky confers with other medical examiners, they reveal that several other RLSHs were killed in neighboring districts, and Gibbs recognizes a pattern. The team arrests corrupt real estate developer Wayne Tobett and his ex-military security officer (assisted by Wayne's own son, Clarence, an enthusiastic RLSH). Tobett was concerned that the RLSHs' activities were discouraging crime, and thus increasing property values, in slum areas where he wanted to buy cheap. One of Wendy's stories reported the increase in property values in the same areas where the RLSHs were killed, and Tobett feared she would make the connection.

In private, Tony asks Wendy why she cancelled their engagement; she answers that she wasn't ready for commitment at the time, but she reached out to him after divorcing her previous husband, because she wants to explore the option of restarting their relationship.

== Production ==
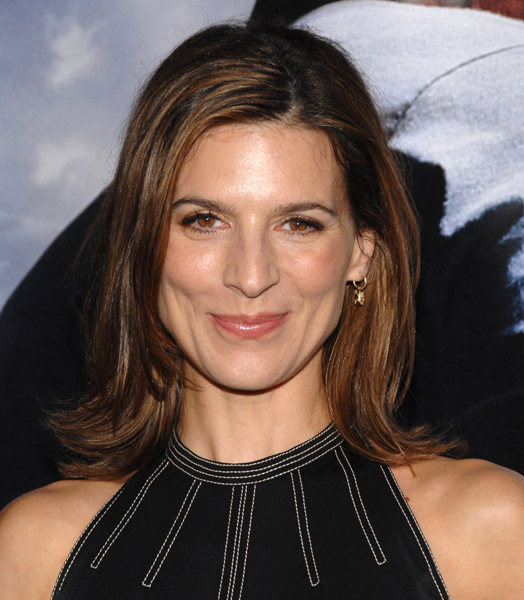
Perrey Reeves guest starred as Tony's ex-fiancée Wendy Miller in "Secrets".

"Secrets" is written by Steven D. Binder and directed by Leslie Libman. The story of the episode centers around Special agent Anthony "Tony" DiNozzo (Michael Weatherly) and his ex-fiancée Wendy Miller (Perrey Reeves). "We went into [this season] with the sense of talking about decisions in the team members' lives, and there have been elements of things Tony has been reflecting on all season, which is really why we wanted to do a story with Wendy", executive producer Gary Glasberg told TV Guide. According to Reeves, "[Tony] was brokenhearted, and I think he sort of protected himself all this time. ... In this episode you see the soft side. He's super funny, but I think when you see the two of them interact, you realize that some of it is a little bit of a protective device".

Aired on Valentine's Day, the episode also includes some romantic moments between Tony and Wendy. "Wendy carries a huge flame for Tony. I think she was afraid [back then]. I think she has been hurt in her past, and here was this person who brought out all these qualities in her and as much as she wanted to go down that road with him, she was too wounded", Reeves said to TV Guide.

Wendy is mentioned in earlier episodes of NCIS as Tony's high school teacher, but is shown as a reporter in this episode. According to writer and co-executive producer Steven Binder, "she simply had left her teaching days behind her and had become a reporter".

== Reception ==
"Secrets" was seen by 19.59 million live viewers following its broadcast on February 14, 2012, with an 11.7/19 share among all households, and 3.9/11 share among adults aged 18 to 49. A rating point represents one percent of the total number of television sets in American households, and a share means the percentage of television sets in use tuned to the program. In total viewers, "Secrets" easily won NCIS and CBS the night, while the spin-off NCIS: Los Angeles drew second and was seen by 16.15 million viewers. Compared to last week's episode "Life Before His Eyes", "Secrets" was down a bit in both viewers and adults 18-49.

Steve Marsi from TV Fanatic gave the episode 4.5 (out of 5) and stated that "it was a cheesy case at times, but it offered plenty of laughs, so it worked", and "overall, it was a fun hour that struck the perfect NCIS balance of action, comedy and surprisingly complex character development".

== Trivia ==
- During his autopsy of the two victims, Ducky describes the activities of "the Fox", a real-life superhero of his youth who collected sewage and dumped it in the lobby of an industrial company that was polluting a local lake. This is closely similar to the activities of James F. Phillips, a science teacher and environmental activist who used the alias "The Fox" and is often seen as a precursor to the real-life superhero community.

== Trivia ==
- In the last scene, at 38:01, it appears that Tony is stifling an unscripted sneeze shortly after entering the flower shop.
