= Enemy on the Hill =

- NCIS episode
- Episode no.: Season 9 Episode 4
- Directed by: Dennis Smith
- Written by: George Schenck & Frank Cardea
- Original air date: October 11, 2011

Guest appearances
- Jack Conley as Metro Detective Danny Sportelli; Brett Tucker as Navy Lieutenant Commander Geoffrey Brett; Michael B. Silver as Nicholas Sandlock; Melissa Ponzio as Drew Turner; Morocco Omari as NCIS Special Agent Thomas Survoy; Shannon Wilcox as Mrs. Roach; Daniel Louis Rivas as Kyle Davis; Tate Sibila Vargas as ZNN Reporter Samantha; Karly Rothenberg as Female Passerby; Kevin Cotteleer as Paul Marvin Arliss

Episode chronology
← Previous "The Penelope Papers"	Next → "Safe Harbor"
- NCIS season 9

"Enemy on the Hill" is the fourth episode in the ninth season of the police procedural drama, NCIS, and the 190th episode overall. It originally aired on CBS in the United States on October 11, 2011. The episode is written by George Schenck and Frank Cardea, directed by Dennis Smith and registered 18.98 million viewers following airing.

== Plot ==
A contract killer who has evaded arrest over a lengthy period of time flees a news camera crew, but lapses into a coma when struck by a passing van, eventually dying from his injuries. Evidence found on the assassin's body identify his next victim as Navy Lieutenant Commander Geoffrey Brett, a naval officer working as a legislative aide on Capitol Hill. Gibbs and his team act as Brett's protection detail while, sifting through his finances, the team find millions of dollars that have been stolen from the Navy in an account established under the name "George Kaplan".

It is revealed that Kaplan's money manager, Drew Turner, is paying off her gambling debts by embezzling from Kaplan, and was also responsible for hiring the assassin. When Brett hears Kaplan's name, he eludes Ziva in order to find Turner, who is later found hanged in an apparent suicide. Ducky establishes that Turner was in fact manually strangled before being hanged. At the same time, Tony, a film aficionado, remembers that "George Kaplan" was a phony identity created in the 1950s movie North by Northwest. In a final interrogation scene, Brett confesses to accepting large kickbacks from defense contractors in exchange for his influence on Capitol Hill, but insists he was accumulating the money for his daughter's medical care, not for himself. Turner helped him launder the proceeds with the false identity, but when he learned she had embezzled from him and was trying to have him killed, he killed her first.

In a subplot, after volunteering to donate a kidney, Abby discovers that she and another potential donor are a DNA match, and that the other donor is her biological brother. This revelation leaves Abby stunned and so distracted by the thought of her parents giving a child up for adoption that she can't focus on the case, even forgetting to do the simple things like running evidence. After she is told by the hospital that they can't release her brother's name, Gibbs and McGee find it out themselves. Abby meets her brother, Kyle Davis, but doesn't tell him who she is. On a hunch, Abby compares her DNA to a lock of her mother's hair, which she keeps in a locket, and is shaken to learn that she herself was adopted, and her mother and father are not her biological parents. This revelation leaves her distraught and turning to Gibbs for comfort as she begins to wonder why her birth parents gave her up.

== Production ==
It was the seventh episode Schenck, Cardea, and Smith have worked on together. The writers had a discussion with Pauley Perrette, the actress who portrays Abby Sciuto, regarding the story about her adoption, being a donor, and her brother. "Once we decided it was going to lead to the fact Abby was adopted," Schenck and Cardea wrote, "we decided, along with Gary Glasberg, to call Pauley Perrette and discuss the story with her. When she commented that she was going to become "Little Orphan Abby" we loved it so much, we unabashedly "stole" the line and put it in the script. That night we got an email from Pauley who had thought about it and was totally on board. So much so that she suggested the casting of Daniel Louis Rivas for her brother".

The episode marks the return of Metro Police Detective Danny Sportelli whose debut appearance was in the Season 7 episode "The Inside Man".

== Reception ==
"Enemy on the Hill" was seen by 18.98 million live viewers following its broadcast on October 11, 2011, with an 11.7/18 share among all households, and 4.0/11 share among adults aged 18 to 49. A rating point represents one percent of the total number of television sets in American households, a share means the percentage of television sets in use tuned to the program. In total viewers, "Enemy on the Hill" easily won NCIS and CBS the night, while the spin-off NCIS: Los Angeles drew third and was seen by 15.4 million viewers. Compared to last week's episode "The Penelope Papers", "Enemy on the Hill" was down a bit in both viewers and adults 18-49.

Steve Marsi from TV Fanatic gave the episode 5 (out of 5) and stated that "comparing NCIS episodes can be a difficult task, since almost all of them range from very good to excellent, but this one definitely falls into the latter category. "Enemy on the Hill" had it all. Most significantly, Abby made a discovery that rocked her world, but warmed our hearts".
