= Devil's Triangle (NCIS) =

- NCIS episode
- Episode no.: Season 9 Episode 7
- Directed by: Leslie Libman
- Written by: Steven D. Binder and Reed Steiner
- Original air date: November 1, 2011

Guest appearances
- Joe Spano as Senior FBI Agent T.C. Fornell; Melinda McGraw as Diane Sterling; Tom Gallop as Victor Sterling; Meredith Eaton as Carol Wilson; Seth Peterson as Thomas Pearce; J. Claude Deering as Curtis Hubley; D'Anthony Palms as Ticket Taker

Episode chronology
← Previous "Thirst"	Next → "Engaged (Part I)"
- NCIS season 9

"Devil's Triangle" is the 7th episode of the ninth season of the American police procedural drama NCIS, and the 193rd episode overall. It originally aired on CBS in the United States on November 1, 2011. The episode is written by Steven D. Binder and Reed Steiner and directed by Leslie Libman, and was seen by 19.71 million viewers.

== Plot ==
Gibbs and Fornell are approached by their mutual ex-wife, Diane, when her current husband Victor, a Homeland Security employee, disappears from a drive-through under suspicious circumstances. NCIS is officially brought into the investigation when a dead employee from the same drive-through is revealed to be a Navy reservist. Tony, Ziva, McGee, and Abby are all amused by Gibbs and Fornell's awkward behavior around Diane and attempt to find out more about their boss's marriage.

Investigating Victor, they find that he has $2 million hidden in banks in the Cayman Islands, and accessed a government database to copy a genetic blueprint for a deadly Ebola-variant virus. The obvious conclusion is that Victor has been embezzling funds from the Department of Defense, and is planning on selling the virus to the highest bidder. Checking Diane's background, McGee also discovers, to his embarrassment, that Diane was traveling to the Caymans with Victor while she was still married to Fornell.

The team finds Victor being held prisoner at an abandoned warehouse. Diane confronts him over the $2 million he was hiding from her, and he tells her he inherited it before they married, and he has kept it secret just because "when you have a lot of money, it's hard to know who your friends are." He tells Gibbs and Fornell that the kidnappers forced him to steal the virus recipe by threatening Diane, and they are not planning to sell it, but to use it. Based on a conversation Victor overheard, the team is able to prevent the attack in the nick of time, on an assembly of high-ranking officers from all five branches of the armed forces, at a football game. The mastermind is revealed to be Victor's boss, a Homeland Security agent who was hired by someone inside the military-industrial complex, hoping to prevent a planned reduction in the size of the U.S. military. With the threat over, Fornell and the FBI take control of the case.

In private, Diane visits Gibbs and thanks him for rescuing Victor. Gibbs is uncomfortable when she admits that their marriage was a mistake, because Gibbs will never love another woman the way he loved his first wife, Shannon; he is even more uncomfortable when she admits that it was a mistake for her to marry Fornell, because Gibbs was her "Shannon", and she loved him in the same way, even when he didn't love her back.

== Production ==
"Devil's Triangle" is written by Steven D. Binder and Reed Steiner and directed by Leslie Libman. According to Binder and Steiner, "This is an episode of discovery for long-time viewers of the show". The theme for the episode is the relationship between Gibbs' and his ex-wife Diane (Melinda McGraw), who's also Fornell's (Joe Spano) ex-wife. "Everyone who watches the show knows that Shannon was Gibbs’ One True Love. He may have lost her, but he never let go." The writers "breakthrough moment" was when they realized Diane felt the same about Gibbs, and "it was also a breakthrough moment for Gibbs himself".

On September 28, 2011, TV Guide announced that Melinda McGraw was cast as Diane Sterling, who portrays one of Gibbs' ex-wives. Joe Spano also reprises his role as Tobias Fornell, Gibbs friend from the FBI who also share Diane as an ex-wife.

== Reception ==
"Devil's Triangle" was seen by 19.71 million live viewers following its broadcast on November 1, 2011, with a 12.2/19 share among all households, and 3.9/11 share among adults aged 18 to 49. A rating point represents one percent of the total number of television sets in American households, and a share means the percentage of television sets in use tuned to the program. In total viewers, "Devil's Triangle" easily won NCIS and CBS the night, while the spin-off NCIS: Los Angeles drew second and was seen by 15.52 million viewers. Compared to the last episode "Thirst", "Devil's Triangle" was down in viewers and up in adults 18–49.

Steve Marsi from TV Fanatic gave the episode 4.7 (out of 5) and stated that "It was excellent from beginning to end, but the most moving, unexpected and emotionally loaded scene in "Devil's Triangle" was its last. Gibbs was Diane's "Shannon," the one love she'll never replace."
