= Nature of the Beast (NCIS) =

- NCIS episode
- Episode no.: Season 9 Episode 1
- Directed by: Tony Wharmby
- Written by: Gary Glasberg
- Original air date: September 20, 2011

Guest appearances
- Brian Dietzen as Jimmy Palmer; Sarah Jane Morris as NCIS Special Agent Erica Jane "E.J" Barrett; Wendy Makkena as Dr. Rachel Cranston; Philip Casnoff as Sean Latham; Matthew Willig as NCIS Special Agent Simon Cade; Scott Wolf as FBI Agent Casey Stratton; Matt Craven as Secretary of the Navy Clayton Jarvis; Bryan Friday as Captain Felix Wright

Episode chronology
← Previous "Pyramid"	Next → "Restless"
- NCIS season 9

"Nature of the Beast" is the first episode of the ninth season of the American police procedural drama NCIS, and the 187th episode overall. It originally aired on CBS in the United States on September 20, 2011, and was seen by 19.96 million viewers.

== Plot ==
With Tony hospitalized following an incident that leaves him with a gunshot wound and severe head trauma, Gibbs enlists Dr. Rachel Cranston to help him regain his memory.

Several months earlier, (Note: As depicted in Episode 8.24, "Pyramid") Navy Secretary Clayton Jarvis orders Tony to investigate an agent who is leaking classified information. As Ziva, McGee, and Abby attempt to learn more about Tony's assignment, Ducky reveals that he observed former agent E.J. Barrett removing a microchip from the late Gayne Levin's body. Ducky later theorizes that a microchip was also removed from the body of Captain Felix Wright, a personal friend of Jarvis.

The team learns that Wright and Levin previously worked at the Office of Naval Intelligence under Sean Latham and were members of Phantom Eight, a black-ops team formed to prevent terrorist attacks. Latham reveals the microchips gave Phantom Eight members access to the Watcher Fleet, which monitors anti-military activity. Both Latham and Jarvis suspect E.J. of murdering Wright in order to steal his microchip and sell it alongside Levin's.

Tony meets with E.J., who explains that Levin made her promise to remove the microchip and return it to Wright in the event he was harmed. He is later lured to a meeting with E.J. and Simon Cade, who is revealed to be the target of his investigation. As Cade claims someone is framing him, an unknown assailant opens fire, killing Cade and wounding E.J. and Tony. E.J. is later reported missing.

In the present, a man identifying himself as FBI Agent Stratton attempts to speak with Tony but backs off after confrontations with Gibbs and Cranston. Tony then regains his memory, identifying Stratton as the shooter. Vance discovers that Stratton does not work for the FBI and vows to learn his true identity.

As Stratton and Latham put the microchips up for auction on the black market, Gibbs opens the box that Mike Franks left him and discovers a file on the Phantom Eight team and a photograph of its members, including Stratton.

== Production ==
NCIS showrunner Gary Glasberg thought about the main storyline at a Las Vegas hotel, ending up with the idea involving Tony, Cade, Levin, and Barrett: "Cade is the one in the picture, but he didn't do it. The audience needs to think EJ is the one in the photo, but she isn't the traitor either. Yes, she took the microchip from Levin, but what if she did it for well-intentioned reasons? What if the whole thing was a set-up?" When considering how to make Tony remember, Glasberg thought, "Why not bring Dr. Rachel Cranston back? She could help Tony remember what he'd done. She and Gibbs could help him put the pieces together."

Glasberg also knew that "Tony, EJ and Cade needed to all be innocent pawns in someone else's larger plan. And that's how Stratton and Latham (Scott Wolf and Phil Casnoff) were born. New villains for an exciting new season".

== Reception ==
"Nature of the Beast" was seen by 19.96 million live viewers following its broadcast on September 20, 2011, with a 4.3/12 share among adults aged 18 to 49. A rating point represents one percent of the total number of television sets in American households, a share means the percentage of television sets in use tuned to the program. In total viewers, "Nature of the Beast" easily won NCIS and CBS the night, while the spin-off NCIS: Los Angeles drew second and was seen by 16.11 million viewers. Compared to the last episode "Pyramid", "Nature of the Beast" was up a bit in both viewers and adults 18–49.

Steve Marsi from TV Fanatic gave the episode 4.5 (out of 5) and stated that "the ninth season premiere of NCIS was slower-paced and more complicated than expected, but provided a compelling conclusion to Tony's mole hunt while setting up a new foil, and a new enemy, for Gibbs".
