= Life Before His Eyes =

- NCIS episode
- Episode no.: Season 9 Episode 14
- Directed by: Tony Wharmby
- Written by: Gary Glasberg
- Original air date: February 7, 2012

Guest appearances
- Brian Dietzen as Jimmy Palmer; Muse Watson as Mike Franks; Ralph Waite as Jackson Gibbs; Joe Spano as Senior FBI Agent Tobias Fornell; Darby Stanchfield as Shannon Gibbs; Michael O'Neill as Former NCIS Special Agent Riley McCallister; Rudolf Martin as Ari Haswari; Sean Harmon as Young Leroy Jethro Gibbs; Jeananne Goossen as Marine Private Joan Matteson; Sam Schuder as Kelly Gibbs; Clare Carey as Ann Gibbs; Jordan Garrett as Stephen Rose; Mackenzie Astin as Michael Rose; Tim Kelleher as NCIS Special Agent Christopher Pacci; Jeff Williams as Doctor; Connie Jackson as Elaine; Thomas Rosales, Jr. as Pedro Hernandez

Episode chronology
← Previous "A Desperate Man"	Next → "Secrets"
- NCIS season 9

"Life Before His Eyes" is the 14th episode of the ninth season of the American crime drama television series NCIS, and the 200th episode overall. It originally aired on CBS in the United States on February 7, 2012. The episode is written by Gary Glasberg and directed by Tony Wharmby, and was seen by 20.98 million viewers. In the episode, Gibbs (Mark Harmon) is shot during his stop at a diner. Before the bullet hits him, Gibbs flashes through memories of big choices he has made in his life.

== Plot ==
During a routine stop in a diner for his morning coffee, Gibbs faces a gunman. He then suddenly finds himself inside a spectral version of the diner where he sees various characters from the past and present, both living and dead. He meets Mike Franks, who tells him that this is an opportunity for him to reflect on his past actions. He shows him an alternate future where Kate did not die, but marries DiNozzo and has a baby, due to Gibbs spotting Ari in time and forcing him to abandon his sniper nest when he sees the police helicopter coming. However, as a result, Ziva stays with Mossad and is eventually arrested by NCIS. Gibbs then meets his mother, and he reaffirms that he had always loved her. Disgraced NCIS Agent Riley McCallister then appears and questions Gibbs' decision to murder Pedro Hernandez in revenge for killing Shannon and Kelly. Gibbs has Mike show him the future where he could not kill Hernandez and avenge his family, and it is revealed that he would have left NCIS and become a broken, reclusive alcoholic who pushes away any attempts to reach out to him (including the one by Ducky and husband-and-wife Abby and McGee). Finally, he meets Shannon and Kelly, who show him a future where they had never died. Gibbs would have stayed a Marine, but would have been killed in action overseas, with two Marines in full dress uniform arriving at Shannon's doorstep to give her the grim news. Through this experience, Gibbs learns that he should not regret the choices he has or has not made.

This experience is related to a case one day before the shooting, where a Petty Officer and civilian contractor are found shot aboard a drydocked warship. They were attempting to steal the ship's military hard drives and sell them to the Chinese. However, the third accomplice, Michael Rose, eventually balks and is forced to kill his co-conspirators in self-defense. Michael's son, Steven, pleads to Gibbs that his father was trying to do the right thing, and he was just misguided (Michael himself admits to Gibbs he couldn’t look his son in the eye and tell him he lost their home and he can’t send him to college). Gibbs decides not to help Michael. On the day that Gibbs is shot, he draws his pistol but refuses to fire when he realizes that the shooter is Steven. Steven fires, but only hits Gibbs in the shoulder. Steven is subdued by several bystanders and he apologizes for shooting Gibbs as they wait for the police to arrive and arrest Steven for attempted murder of a Federal officer. The next day, McGee tells the rest of the team that he turned down Director Vance's offer for a promotion to Okinawa since he feels there is still a lot of good he can do where he is right now. Despite being injured, Gibbs returns to work, freshly inspired by his near death experience.

== Production ==
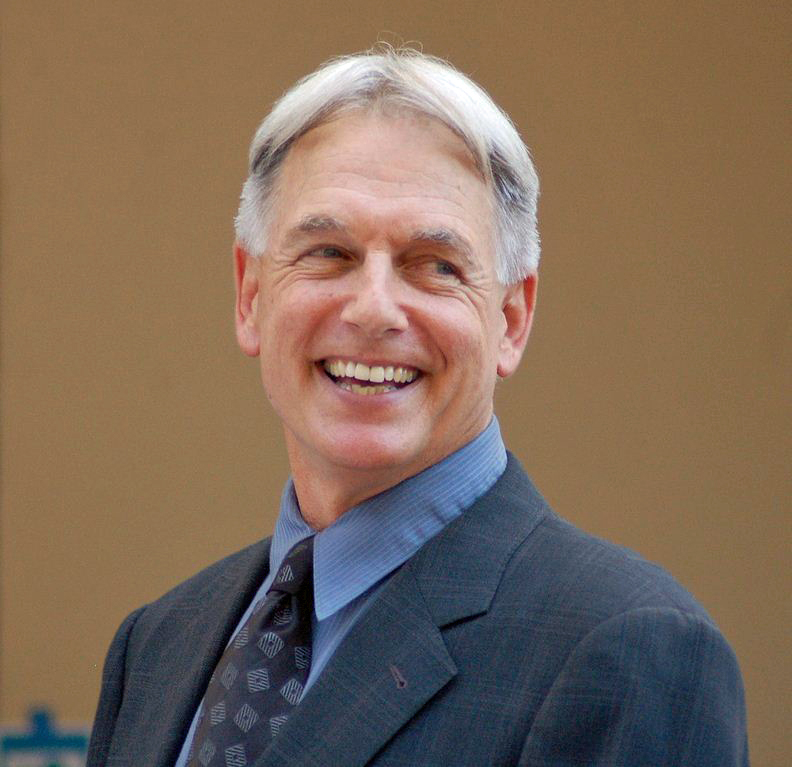
Mark Harmon portrays Leroy Jethro Gibbs in the 200th episode of NCIS.

=== Writing ===
"Life Before His Eyes" is written by Gary Glasberg and directed by Tony Wharmby. Glasberg got the idea of how to make the episode back in July 2011, and wanted it to be an episode for the fans. "In all of its quirkiness, 'Life Before His Eyes' was meant to be one thing - a gift to the fans. Believe me, we know it was a departure from the usual formula. An intentionally unique idea because we all felt episode #200 couldn't be 'just another NCIS'". One big part of the episode was all of the "what if"-stories, which showed some alternative developments if Gibbs hadn't done what he actually did. "Our 200th episode was a fun opportunity to get a glimpse of what could have happened or could be in the future". "Gibbs is given an opportunity in a millisecond to see what the world would have been like if key moments in NCIS history and lore had unfolded differently. We've taken some of those moments and we let people see them unfold differently."

An alternate reality scene between Tony and Ziva was advertised before the episode aired, in which Tony meets Ziva while interrogating her. Michael Weatherly commented that the scene would, in part, show the negative effects of Ziva having never known Gibbs: "You get a real glimpse into the hellcat she might have become without that guiding hand." However, most of the scene was later cut due to time constraints, and Weatherly subsequently tweeted "Where's the big Tiva interrogation in Ep200? Fans were misled.-We Shot a longer scene but it was edited down! Show biz is tough!"

=== Casting ===
A lot of familiar characters are shown in the episode, some who died years ago. The return of Kate Todd, Mike Franks, Ari Haswari and Jenny Shepard, and how some of these characters still could have been a part of the show made it a special episode. CGI footage is used to incorporate appearances from the ghost of Lauren Holly's Director Jenny Shepard and an Alternate Universe version of Special Agent Caitlin Todd, played by Sasha Alexander. "We’re doing some really cool things, not only with people we were able to get back, but also with visual effects." Alexander was out of the country during filming and unable to reprise Caitlin Todd, but granted the production permission to use her image. The scene of Caitlin reuses archive footage from Season 2's "SWAK".

This is the second episode (after Season 8's "A Man Walks Into a Bar...") to feature clips of all the main characters up to this episode on the show.

== Reception ==
=== Ratings ===
"Life Before His Eyes" was seen by 20.98 million live viewers following its broadcast on February 7, 2012, with a 12.7/19 share among all households, and 4.2/11 share among adults aged 18 to 49. A rating point represents one percent of the total number of television sets in American households, and a share means the percentage of television sets in use tuned to the program. In total viewers, "Life Before His Eyes" easily won NCIS and CBS the night, while the spin-off NCIS: Los Angeles drew second and was seen by 16.27 million viewers.

As the 200th episode of the show, it was heavily promoted by CBS in both commercials and social networks. TV Guide Magazine had a big interview discussing the coming episode with the cast and crew.

=== Critical reviews ===
Steve Marsi from TV Fanatic gave the "Life Before His Eyes" 5 (out of 5) and stated that "Life Before His Eyes was not only an NCIS benchmark, but a crossroads for the characters that made these 200 episodes so good; a reflection on where they've been, where they might have gone, and where they're headed." Alan Sepinwall from Hitfix called the episode "an unabashed love letter to the fans" and David Hinckley from Daily News used it as an example of the way the show reveals the characters' backgrounds in "bits and pieces" by "peeling a little more off [Gibbs'] onion".
