= James F. Phillips =

American environmentalist and schoolteacher

- Born: November 20, 1930
- Died: October 3, 2001 (aged 70); Aurora, Illinois, US
- Other name: "The Fox"
- Occupation: Middle school science teacher

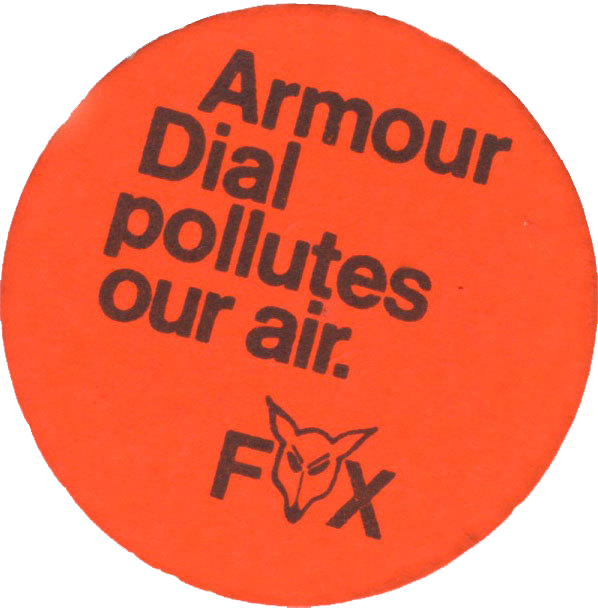
A bright-orange sticker created and distributed by Phillips for one of his direct action campaigns against Armour Dial

James F. Phillips (November 20, 1930 – October 3, 2001) was an American schoolteacher and environmental activist who became known in the Chicago, Illinois area during the 1960s for his environmental direct action under the pseudonym The Fox.

== Biography ==
James F. Phillips was raised on his family's farm in Montgomery. He attended Northern Illinois University, where he earned a degree in Biology.

Phillips was employed as a middle school science teacher in Oak Lawn and Hillside, Illinois, and later as a field inspector for the Kane County Environmental Department. He retired in 1986.

In his personal life, he was a historical boater who taught and demonstrated native American and early trapper fishing and boating techniques.

== Environmental activism ==
Phillips was first motivated in the 1960s to plug a sewage outfall after seeing dead ducks in the Fox River. In the following years, his activism included erecting signs criticizing US Steel, plugging sewer outlets, placing caps on top of smoke stacks, leaving skunks on the doorsteps of the owners of polluting companies, and, in one case, transporting 50 pounds of sewage from Lake Michigan into the reception room of the company that had discharged it. His direct action techniques predated those of Greenpeace and other environmental organizations.

Phillips discovered Armour Dial (Henkel Corporation) had been polluting Mill Creek which emptied into the Fox River, which violated a 1962 law that limited the amount of chemicals companies could dump into the surrounding water. Phillips created stickers issuing warnings that read "Armour Dial Kills our Water" or "Armour Dial Pollutes our air". He organized a group to travel to supermarkets around the United States and put these stickers on bars of Dial soap. Columnist Mike Royko called Phillips's attack "the most ambitious anti-pollution prank of his colorful career." The prank started an independent boycott of all Armour-Dial products, and after seven years, the state of Illinois sued Armour Dial's Montgomery plant for violating Illinois pollution standards.

He was radicalized as a founding mentor of the Earth Liberation Front movement after witnessing toxic dumping into the Fox River over decades, polluting the river to near-death. Phillips gained notoriety after dumping a bucket of said toxic waste upon the desk of a Stone Container Corporation executive in Chicago. He was rumored to have also plugged drainage pipes from toxic industrial plants from his canoe along the Fox River.

When U.S. Steel adopted the slogan "We're Involved", Phillips erected a 70-foot-long banner that said, "We're Involved in Killing Lake Michigan". He retired in 1986 to start the Fox River Conservation Foundation and was on the board of "Friends of the Fox". Phillips authored an autobiography titled Raising Kane: The Fox Chronicles, explaining his rationale and activism. A memorial dedicated to Phillips and his efforts to clean up the Fox River is located in Violet Patch Park on the Fox River in Oswego, Illinois. The dedication was held in 2006.

Although he never admitted to his role as the Fox, family and friends confirmed this identity.

Reactions to his activism were mixed. David Dominick, Commissioner of the Federal Water Quality Administration, suggested that the Fox's activities represented a challenge as to whether "we, as individuals in a technological society, have the will to control and prevent the degradation of our environment." The police said they would charge the Fox if he were caught, but were unable to do so.

Dick Young, Kane County's first environmental director who helped create Kendall County's forest preserve system said this about him: "Phillips made a difference. The Fox helped change the way we think about our waterways. Scenic bike trails have been built over old railroad tracks along the Fox River". Jim Phillips received the Living Treasures of North America Heritage Award on Earth Day, April 20, 2002. Chicago Reader

== Cultural references ==
- A condensed biography of Phillips was included in journalist Tea Krulos's book Heroes in the Night, which describes him as a precursor to the real-life superheroes movement.
- In the NCIS episode "Secrets", Dr. Donald Mallard references "The Fox" when examining the bodies of two real-life superheroes killed in the Washington, D.C. area. Phillips is not mentioned by name, but Mallard's description of one of his more dramatic acts – dumping 50 pounds of sewage in the lobby of an offending company – is a clear reference to Phillips.
