= Housekeeping (NCIS) =

- NCIS episode
- Episode no.: Season 9 Episode 12
- Directed by: Terrence O'Hara
- Written by: Scott Williams
- Original air date: January 3, 2012

Guest appearances
- Matt Craven as Secretary of the Navy Clayton Jarvis; Scott Wolf as FBI Agent Casey Stratton; Sarah Jane Morris as NCIS Special Agent Erica Jane "E.J." Barrett; Philip Casnoff as Sean Latham; Iqbal Theba as Ramesh Sengupta; Christine Lynn Smith as Cara Barnsway; Annie O'Donnell as Agnes Anderstout; Dante Brown as Skip; Sean Ryan Fox as Dave

Episode chronology
← Previous "Newborn King"	Next → "A Desperate Man"
- NCIS season 9

"Housekeeping" is the 12th episode of the ninth season of the American crime drama television series NCIS, and the 198th episode overall. It originally aired on CBS in the United States on January 3, 2012. The episode is written by Scott Williams and directed by Terrence O’Hara, and was seen by 19.81 million viewers.

The episode continues the plot between EJ Barrett, Casey Stratton and Tony DiNozzo, last seen in "Nature of the Beast".

== Plot ==
The investigation of a Navy Commander's murder leads the team to E.J. Barrett to reopen their investigation into Agent Stratton. While Tony has to contend with the bitter feelings about E.J. leaving him in the earlier ambush, Ziva is frustrated herself as she has not heard from Ray in weeks. The team learns that Stratton is still after Agent Barrett. They reveal to the ONI Director that they know he is in league with Stratton, who is actually a rogue black ops agent named Cole. They trick the Director into filtering false information to Cole, who then kills the Director to tie up loose ends. Using E.J. as bait, the team manages to arrest Cole. With the threat to her life now over, E.J. decides to return to her family, but not before urging Tony to try to pursue a relationship with Ziva. Afterwards, Tony takes E.J's advice and asks Ziva out, but at that moment Ray finally calls Ziva.

== Production ==
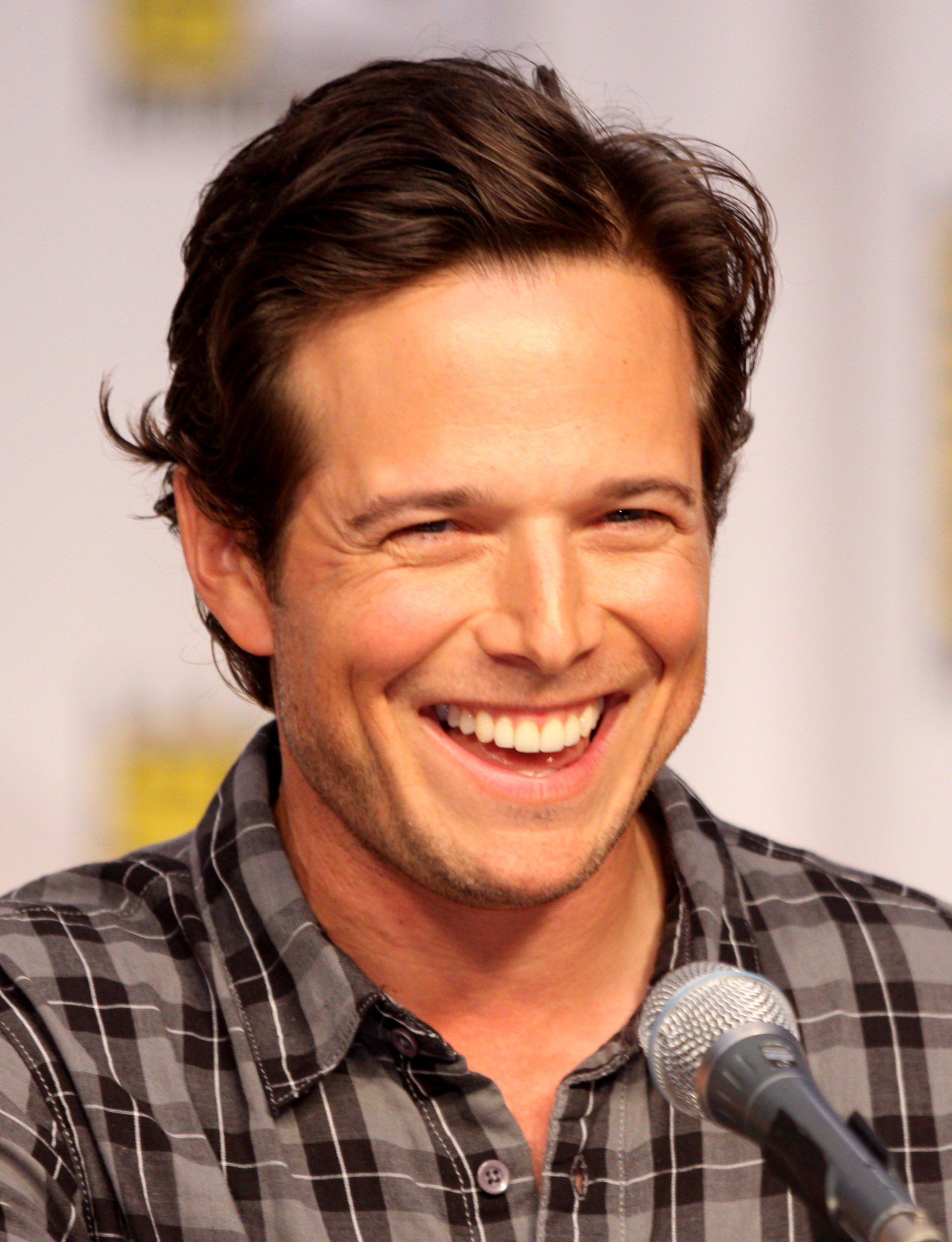
Scott Wolf reprised his role as FBI Agent Casey Stratton.

"Housekeeping" was written by Scott Williams and directed by Terrence O’Hara. The main story of the episode is the return of EJ Barrett and FBI agent Stratton, last seen in the season premier "Nature of the Beast". According to executive producer Gary Glasberg, "Stratton intends to finish what he started and influence some unexpected lives in the process, including Gibbs". The writer of the episode, Scott Williams, said in his blogpost that fans of NCIS especially had three questions regarding the continuing plot in the episode: "Where did EJ go? Who was that Stratton guy? And why is his boss Latham selling those microchips to the highest bidder?". Together with this, he stated that "one of the unexpected opportunities the episode provided in the writing process was a chance to deal with what many of you fans refer to as "Tiva". Getting to understand the relationship between Tony and Ziva was great fun".

Three characters are recurring in the episode: Sarah Jane Morris as NCIS Special Agent E. J. Barrett, Scott Wolf as FBI Agent Casey Stratton and Matt Craven as Secretary of the Navy Clayton Jarvis.

== Reception ==
"Housekeeping" was seen by 19.81 million live viewers following its broadcast on January 3, 2012, with an 11.9/18 share among all households, and 4.1/11 share among adults aged 18 to 49. A rating point represents one percent of the total number of television sets in American households, and a share means the percentage of television sets in use tuned to the program. In total viewers, "Housekeeping" easily won NCIS and CBS the night, while the spin-off NCIS: Los Angeles drew second and was seen by 17.08 million viewers. Compared to the last episode "Newborn King", "Housekeeping" was up a bit in both viewers and adults 18-49.

Steve Marsi from TV Fanatic gave the episode 5 (out of 5) and stated that "'Housekeeping' marked the resumption of the complex Phantom Eight plot, which nearly got Tony and E.J. killed in September's season premiere. This evening, they were very much under the gun again. While the interplay between the core cast members makes every episode enjoyable, and is the primary reason this is TV's highest-rated drama, certain story arcs and adversaries have a way of raising the stakes on NCIS". Sandra Gonzalez from Entertainment Weekly called Tony and Ziva's last scene "pretty awesome" and wrote, "The term 'slow burn' doesn't even begin to describe the progression of Tony and Ziva's could-be romantic relationship on NCIS over the years. But hardcore 'Tiva' fans, who have waited patiently for stolen glances and playful interactions to turn into something more, certainly got a bit of a New Year's treat last night during the show's first new episode of 2012."
