= Newborn King =

- NCIS episode
- Episode no.: Season 9 Episode 11
- Directed by: Dennis Smith
- Written by: Christopher J. Waild
- Original air date: December 13, 2011

Guest appearances
- Brian Dietzen as Jimmy Palmer; Larry Miller as Ed Slater; Erin Cottrell as Marine Lieutenant Emma Reynolds; David S. Lee as Veli Tupolev; Hugh Scott as Police Deputy Billy McCormick; Brandi Burkhardt as Desk Clerk; Michelle Pierce as Breena Slater; Kevin Rock as DoD Liaison Harris Klein; Marc Aden Gray as Navy Captain Jake Marsden

Episode chronology
← Previous "Sins of the Father"	Next → "Housekeeping"
- NCIS season 9

"Newborn King" is the eleventh episode of the ninth season of the American crime drama television series NCIS, and the 197th episode overall. It originally aired on CBS in the United States on December 13, 2011. The episode is written by Christopher J. Waild and directed by Dennis Smith, and was seen by 19.13 million viewers.

== Plot ==
When a Navy captain is killed in a hotel room, NCIS must track down and protect his heavily pregnant companion from unknown assailants. They discover that his companion was a Marine Lieutenant Emma Reynolds who had had a romantic relationship with an Afghan heir of a powerful tribe with strategically important land holdings in Afghanistan. The team has to put their Christmas Eve celebrations on hold as terrible weather conditions and the absence of government employees due to the holiday season hamper the investigation. After doing some research, they find out that the father is dead and the unborn child, if male, will inherit his land. One of the three Russian mercenaries sent to kidnap the child is captured and taken back to headquarters where he is interrogated by McGee and Tony while Gibbs and Ziva go on the run with Emma. McGee and Tony manage to find out that the mercenaries were hired by elders of the Afghan tribe to prevent the child from falling into the hands of the United States, who they feared would use the child as a bargaining chip to gain control of their land. The freezing temperatures causes Gibbs' car engine to freeze and break down. The remaining Russian mercenaries catch up with the trio by the time McGee and Tony, back at the lab, can locate them. Emma's water breaks and Gibbs doubles up as midwife while Ziva engages in a gunfight to fend and kill the mercenaries who have been tailing her, Gibbs and Emma. The baby is then revealed to be a girl.

Meanwhile, Jimmy has problems of his own when he brings his future father-in-law Ed to work. He is initially rude and unappreciative towards the team, wondering why Jimmy hasn't gotten a better job in the private sector. Offended, Gibbs, Ducky and rest of the team hold back to give Jimmy face. Unable to endure Ed's constant whinging any longer, Jimmy chastises his father-in-law and tells him about all the good he can achieve in NCIS, convincing him to bless their marriage.

The episode ended with the following dedication: "Happy Holidays to the men and women who protect and serve our country at home and abroad."

== Production ==
"Newborn King" was written by Christopher J. Waild and directed by Dennis Smith. Waild was asked to write the Christmas episode by showrunner Gary Glasberg, and he "tried to focus [...] on something more than superficial embellishments". Instead of focus on "décor or nostalgia", Waild's "goal" with the episode was "about capturing a little of what makes the Christmas season important: sacrifice".

On November 7, 2011, Entertainment Weekly announced that Larry Miller was cast as Ed Slater, the future father-in-law of Jimmy Palmer (Brian Dietzen). "Jimmy Palmer is engaged. And with fiancée Breena comes spending the holidays with his future in-laws," Glasberg told Entertainment Weekly.

== Reception ==
"Newborn King" was seen by 19.13 million live viewers following its broadcast on December 13, 2011, with a 3.6/10 share among adults aged 18 to 49. A rating point represents one percent of the total number of television sets in American households, and a share means the percentage of television sets in use tuned to the program. In total viewers, "Newborn King" easily won NCIS and CBS the night, while the spin-off NCIS: Los Angeles drew second and was seen by 16.40 million viewers. Compared to the last episode "Sins of the Father", "Newborn King" was up a bit in both viewers and adults 18-49.

Steve Marsi from TV Fanatic gave the episode 4 (out of 5) and stated that "In the spirit of Christmas, we'll forgive NCIS this one. It's not that "Newborn King" was a bad episode, but it felt like an entirely different show. The holiday theme was almost overblown at times, and there was a high level of (often predictable) cheesiness throughout, a far cry from some of the uber-serious, superbly well-written episodes this and every season."
