= The Missionary Position (NCIS) =

- NCIS episode
- Episode no.: Season 9 Episode 20
- Directed by: Arvin Brown
- Written by: Allison Abner
- Original air date: April 10, 2012

Guest appearances
- Brian Dietzen as Jimmy Palmer; Jamie Lee Curtis as Dr. Samantha Ryan; Suleka Mathew as Navy Commander Maria Castro; Karina Lombard as retired Interpol agent Monique Lisson; Jennifer Crystal Foley as CIA agent Constance Mazney; Shane Johnson as CIA agent Stephen Wheeler; John Cothran, Jr. as Alfred Holbrook; Ivo Nandi as Manny Varigan; Asif Ali as Phil; Danna Brady as Judy; Sarah Hudson as Navy Commander Theresa Wade; Martin Morales as Bellman

Episode chronology
← Previous "The Good Son"	Next → "Rekindled"
- NCIS season 9

"The Missionary Position" is the 20th episode of the ninth season of the American police procedural drama NCIS, and the 206th episode overall. It aired on CBS in the United States on April 10, 2012. The episode is written by Allison Abner and directed by Arvin Brown, and was seen by 17.66 million viewers.

== Plot ==
After the corpse of a Marine lieutenant falls out of the sky, Tony helps Ziva and her mentor, Monique, look for missing Navy Chaplain Wade in Colombia. Chaplain Castro, who is one of Wade's colleagues, also decides to travel with them. They theorize that Wade had been kidnapped by a local drug cartel while vaccinating villagers, and narrowly escape an ambush. Chaplain Castro reveals that part of the reason why she is helping them is because she was supposed to have performed Wade's mission. Meanwhile, Gibbs and McGee try to track down the plane that dropped the body. Ryan informs him that the vaccination mission was a covert CIA operation to obtain the DNA of cartel leaders. Tony, Ziva, and Monique manage to rescue Wade from the cartel and escape Colombia. Monique decides to stay behind, admitting that she is involved in something too serious to reveal. Jimmy Palmer chooses his best man but in a surprise twist, he chooses Abby to be his best woman much to her delight.

== Production ==
"The Missionary Position" is written by Allison Abner and directed by Arvin Brown. This is Abner's first episode on NCIS, and was a freelance assignment. Executive producer Gary Glasberg stated "we were lucky to get her for this freelance assignment. Freelancing on any show can be difficult and this program is no exception". Abner has previously worked on shows including The West Wing and Without a Trace.

The end scene with Ziva and Monique at the military airport was filmed right outside the studio and not at an airport. "As for a secret detail of the episode, remember the military airport where Ziva and Monique say their goodbye at the end of the story? That was actually the entrance to our studio and, thanks to our extraordinary special effects and post production team, it miraculously became a working air field".

Both Brian Dietzen and Jamie Lee Curtis are recurring in this episode.

== Reception ==
"The Missionary Position" was seen by 17.66 million live viewers following its broadcast on April 10, 2012, with a 10.9/17 share among all households, and 3.1/9 share among adults aged 18 to 49. A rating point represents one percent of the total number of television sets in American households, and a share means the percentage of television sets in use tuned to the program. In total viewers, "The Missionary Position" easily won NCIS and CBS the night, while the spin-off NCIS: Los Angeles drew third and was seen by 12.86 million viewers. Compared to the last episode "The Good Son", "The Missionary Position" was down a bit in both viewers and adults 18–49.

Steve Marsi from TV Fanatic gave the episode 4.5 (out of 5) and stated that "more questions were asked than answered, and none greater than what Dr. Samantha Ryan (Jamie Lee Curtis) knows about the mysterious Monique Lisson (Karina Lombard), whose penchant for secrecy and suspicious background were evident from the start. In that respect, Lisson is a fitting adversary for Ryan. All in all, an unconventional but solid episode with both a satisfying conclusion and plenty left unresolved".
