= Jack Conley (actor) =

American actor

- Born: New York City, New York, U.S.
- Occupation: Actor
- Years active: 1980–present
- Spouse: Francesca Casale

Jack Conley is an American actor particularly in the crime, mystery and thriller genres.

He is married to Francesca Casale, an actress.

== Filmography ==
=== Film ===
Year	Title	Role	Notes
1980	Heaven's Gate	Morrison	
1992	Hit the Dutchman	Thomas Dewey	
1992	Mad Dog Coll	Owen Madden	
1995	Apollo 13	Science Reporter	
1995	Baja	Duke	
1995	Get Shorty	Agent Dunbar	
1996	Edie & Pen	Pianist	
1996	Hit Me	Mr. Ish's Bodyguard	
1996	The Chamber	White Guard	
1996	The Confidence Man	Stevie Grimes	
1997	L.A. Confidential	Vice Captain	
1998	Brown's Requiem	Richard 'Hot Rod' Ralston	
1998	Mercury Rising	Detective Nichols	
1998	Judas Kiss	Detective Matty Grimes	
1998	Drought		
1999	Payback	Detective Leary	
2000	The Cell	Agent Brock	
2000	Dancing at the Blue Iguana	Officer Pete Foster	
2000	A Better Way to Die	Fletcher	
2000	Traffic	Agent Hughes	
2001	Out of the Black	Sheriff Masterson	
2002	Collateral Damage	Forensic Specialist	
2002	Gentle Ben	Cal Stryker	
2003	Gentle Ben 2: Black Gold	Cal Stryker	
2003	Shade	Buckley	
2003	A House on a Hill	Richard Banks	
2004	Criminal	Henry, The Angry Man	
2005	The Unknown	Sheriff Drake Kassel	
2005	Fun with Dick and Jane	INS Agent	
2006	The Alibi	Officer Holbrook	
2006	Payback: Straight Up - The Director's Cut	Detective Leary	
2007	The Gray Man	Detective Will King	
2007	Half Past Dead 2	Warden Edward Wallace	
2008	Over Her Dead Body	Cab Driver	
2008	Harold & Kumar Escape from Guantanamo Bay	Deputy Frye	
2009	Fast & Furious	Penning	
2009	G-Force	Special Agent David Trygstad	
2009	The Art of War III: Retribution	Gaines	
2009	Crossing Over	OIG Agent Poulson	
2011	The Reunion	Jack Nealson	
2013	Gangster Squad	Sheriff Biscailuz	
2014	The Purge: Anarchy	Big Daddy	
2017	Suburbicon	Lieutenant Hightower	
2018	Desolate	Jeb Turner	

=== Television ===
Year	Title	Role	Notes
1970	ITV Saturday Night Theatre		Episode: "Roll on Four O' Clock"
1995	Tom Clancy's Op Center	Commander Harper	TV film
1995; 2001	NYPD Blue	Ron Duffy (1995); Lieutenant Blount (2001)	Episodes: "The Bank Dick" (1995) "Johnny Got His Gold" (2001)
1995	Live Shot		Episode: "Shake, Rattle and Roll"
1996	Diagnosis: Murder	Officer Frank Barons	Episode: "Love is Murder"
1996; 1999; 2004	JAG	Hemlock (1996); Yarborough (1999); Commander Bob Stanich (2004)	Episodes: "Hemlock" (1996) "Shakedown" (1999) "Crash" (2004)
1996	Kindred: The Embraced	Mr. Benning, P.I.	Episode: "The Rise and Fall of Eddie Fiori"
1996	L.A. Firefighters	Chief Deputy Al Morrison	Episodes: "It's A Family Affair" "A Mad Tea Party"
1996	Touched by an Angel	Mr. Phelps	Episode: "Secret Service"
1996	Dark Skies	Rawlings	Episode: "Dreamland"
1996	Apollo 11	Deke Slayton	TV film
1996–1999	Tracey Takes On...	Ray (1996); Nick (1997); Tough Guy (1998); Eric the Car Salesman (1999)	Episodes: "Law" (1996) "Sex" (1997) "Sports" (1998) "Road Rage" (1999)
1997	Profiler	Ed Portero	"FTX: Field Training Exercise"
1997	Players	Jay Bagley	Episode: "Con Law"
1998	Buffy the Vampire Slayer	Gib Cain	Episode: "Phases"
1998	Brooklyn South	FBI Agent Mike Francis	Episode: "Cinnamon Buns"
1999	The Magnificent Seven	Yates	Episode: "The Sins of the Past"
2000	Battery Park	Detective Lomar	Episode: "How Do You Solve a Problem Like Maria?"
2000	Judging Amy	Terry Bogage	Episode: "The Out-Of-Towners"
2000	Freaks and Geeks	Kim Kelly's Stepfather	Episode: "Kim Kelly is My Friend"
2001–2004	Angel	Sahjhan	Recurring role, 8 episodes
2002	Johnson County War	Jesse Jacklin	TV film
2003	Monster Makers	Detective Smiley	TV film
2003	Crossing Jordan	Prison Guard Shanahan	Episode: "Cruel & Unusual"
2003	She Spies	John Marshall	Episode: "Crossed Out"
2003; 2010	CSI: Crime Scene Investigation	Mr. Lizzio (2003); Jack Herson	Episodes: "Coming of Rage" (2003) "Irradiator" (2010) "Meat Jekyll" (2010)
2004	Without a Trace	Mike Carter	Episode: "Exposure"
2005	The West Wing	Major	Episode: "A Good Day"
2005	Arthur Hailey's Detective	Knowles	
2005	E-Ring		Episode: "Cemetery Wind: Part 1"
2005	McBride: Tune in for Murder	Paul Bensen	TV film
2005	The Closer	FBI Agent Jackson	Episodes: "L.A. Woman" "Standards and Practices"
2006	Criminal Minds	John Summers	Episode: "Secrets and Lies"
2006	Grey's Anatomy	Jasper Havey	Episode: "Sometimes & Fantasy"
2007	Big Day	Bob Baron	Episodes: "Last Chance to Marry Jane" "The Ceremony"
2007	Cold Case	Detective Joe Connelly '94-'07	Episode: "Thrill Kill"
2008	House M.D.	Sheriff Costello	Episode: "Birthmarks"
2008	Supernatural	Sheriff Britton	Episode: "Yellow Fever"
2009	CSI: Miami	Seth Ellers	Episode: "Bad Seed"
2009–2017	NCIS	Metro Detective Danny Sportelli	3 episodes: "The Inside Man", "Enemy on the Hill" "Exit Strategy"
2010	The Mentalist	Chief Donner	Episode: "Bleeding Heart"
2010	The Booth at the End	Allen	5 episodes
2012	Sons of Anarchy	Sergeant Mackey	Episodes: "Laying Pipe" "Small World"
2013	American Horror Story: Asylum	Officer Woods	Episode: "Continuum"
2013–2016	Doc McStuffins	Dragon-Bot (voice)	6 episodes
2015	Agent Carter	Colonel Ernst Mueller	Episode: "The Blitzkrieg Button"
2015	Justified	Bartender	Episode: "Justified"
2016–2017; 2019	Animal Kingdom	Jake Dunmore	4 episodes
2018	The Crossing	Shane Doucette	Episode: "LKA"
2018	Code Black	Jonathan Larssen	Episode: "Home Stays Home"
2018	Westworld	Monroe	Episode: "Vanishing Point"
2018	S.W.A.T.	Weller	Episode: "S.O.S."
2020	Station 19	Capt. Lawrence	Season 3, episode 12 & 16
2021; 2023	The Morning Show	Earl	Guest (season 2), recurring (season 3)
2021–2022	9-1-1: Lone Star	Capt. Tatum	Season 2 guest; season 3
2022	Chicago Fire	Don Kilbourne	Season 10, episode 10–12

=== Videogames ===
Year	Title	Role	Notes
2006	Tom Clancy's Splinter Cell: Double Agent		Voice
2009	Red Faction: Guerrilla		Voice
2011	L.A. Noire	Vernon Mapes	Voice
2016	Mafia III	Frank Pagani	Voice
