= Abby Sciuto =

Fictional character

- NCIS character
- Pauley Perrette as Abby Sciuto in a flashback in the season 7 episode "Truth or Consequences".
- First appearance: "Ice Queen" (JAG)
- Last appearance: "Two Steps Back" (NCIS)
- Portrayed by: Pauley Perrette; Brighton Sharbino (age 10)
- Voiced by: Betsy Moore (NCIS: The Video Game)
- Other Appearances: NCIS: Los Angeles; NCIS: New Orleans

In-universe information
- Full name: Abigail Beethoven Sciuto (S12 E13, "The Lost Boys")
- Nickname: Abs
- Gender: Female
- Occupation: Forensic Scientist, NCIS
- Family: Unnamed adoptive father (deceased); Gloria Sciuto (adoptive mother, deceased); Luca Sciuto (adoptive brother); Kyle Davis (biological brother); Gert (aunt); Horace (uncle); Teddy (uncle); Larry (uncle); Unnamed niece
- Religion: Catholic
- Nationality: American

Abigail Beethoven Sciuto /ˈʃuːtoʊ/ is a fictional character from the American television series NCIS. She is portrayed by Pauley Perrette; in the season 10 episode "Hit and Run", a young Abby was played by Brighton Sharbino in flashbacks. The character of Abby was introduced in the episodes "Ice Queen" and "Meltdown" of the television show JAG (which together served as the backdoor pilot for NCIS), and up until May 2018 appeared in every episode of NCIS, in addition to being featured on the show's spin-offs, NCIS: Los Angeles (two episodes) and NCIS: New Orleans (two episodes). The role made Perrette one of 2011's most popular actresses on U.S. primetime television, according to Q Score.

Abigail is a forensic scientist at the Naval Criminal Investigative Service headquarters at the Washington Navy Yard, with expertise in ballistics, digital forensics, and DNA analysis. In the first episode of the seventh season, "Truth or Consequences", DiNozzo, while under the influence of a truth serum, describes her as "a paradox wrapped in an oxymoron smothered in contradictions in terms. Sleeps in a coffin. Really, the happiest Goth you'll ever meet." The character's gothic style of dress and her interest in death and the supernatural contrast with her generally hyperactive demeanor and enthusiasm about her work.

On October 4, 2017, Perrette announced that she would be departing the show at the conclusion of season 15. CBS aired her final episode on May 8, 2018.

== Concept and casting ==
Prior to taking up a career in acting, Pauley Perrette had studied at John Jay School of Criminal Science in New York, having previously aspired "to work with animals, be in a rock 'n' roll band, or be an FBI agent." She eventually began acting, later saying "There's no drug that I ever did that worked as well as being an actor. What you're looking for with substance abuse is escape. But with acting, you can escape into 1,000 different things without almost killing yourself doing it. Acting is a total drug!"

Perrette was cast for the role of Abby Sciuto in 2003. On the subject of her character's creation and its purpose, she said "[NCIS creator] Don Bellisario told me that when he created Magnum, P.I. he wanted to introduce a Vietnam vet who defied the negative stereotype. So with Abby, he wanted to take an alternative-style person with tattoos and make her someone who is happy, totally put together and successful. All the script said about her was: black hair, caffeinated and smart...She's completely unaware that anybody thinks she looks weird. She thinks she looks pretty and never calls herself anything other than happy. And I fight for that."

Child actress Brighton Sharbino was cast to portray 10-year-old Abby for the season 10 episode "Hit and Run", which featured several flashbacks to a young Abby. Sharbino, who strongly resembled Perrette, reportedly spent time with the latter "in part to pick up on the NCIS vet's mannerisms and such."

== Characterization ==
Abby is portrayed as having a gothic style of dress, including black dresses and T-shirts, miniskirts, and goth jewelry, including anklets and toe rings. She wears pigtailed dyed hair (due to Perrette's hair being dyed as she is a natural blonde) and has at least nine tattoos on her neck, arms, back, ankle, and other places. Her neck choker appears to be one of her favorite pieces of jewelry. While some of the tattoos are Perrette's and real, others are makeup, such as the large cross on her back applied on occasions when Perrette shows her bare back on camera. The spider web on her neck is not real, either, as producer Bellisario wanted the character to have a tattoo that would be visible (almost) all the time. However, Perrette has expressed dislike for the spider tattoo, saying, "It only takes a few minutes to do, but it feels like old chewing gum," and had wished for an episode where her character Abby would have it removed. Other character quirks include Abby having a stuffed hippo named "Bert" that makes flatulent/farting noises when squeezed, which has been used for comic effect when Abby is upset. She decorates some of the areas in her lab with toys such as "Bleeding Edge Goth" dolls and "Teddy Scares". The Teddy Scare 'Rita Mortis' can be seen sitting next to her computer monitor. Abby's biggest pet peeve, as revealed in season five's "Lost and Found" by Timothy McGee, is people who claim to be vegetarians, but still eat chicken; her second-biggest pet peeve is people who mishandle evidence.

Pauley Perrette commented, "Don (Bellisario) wanted to do Abby as an alternative-lifestyle person, but not as a junkie or a thief. She might be the smartest person on television." When asked about her depiction of a goth character, she responded that Abby "wouldn't call herself anything but Abby...What she represents is a smart, capable chick that cannot be reduced to a stereotype."

Abby drives a candy-apple red 1930/31 Ford Model A coupe bearing a Washington, DC, personalized vanity plate "4NS CHIK" which is prominently featured in season five's "Dog Tags". She previously drove a hearse (mentioned in "Hiatus, Part I"), which ran poorly and had bald tires.

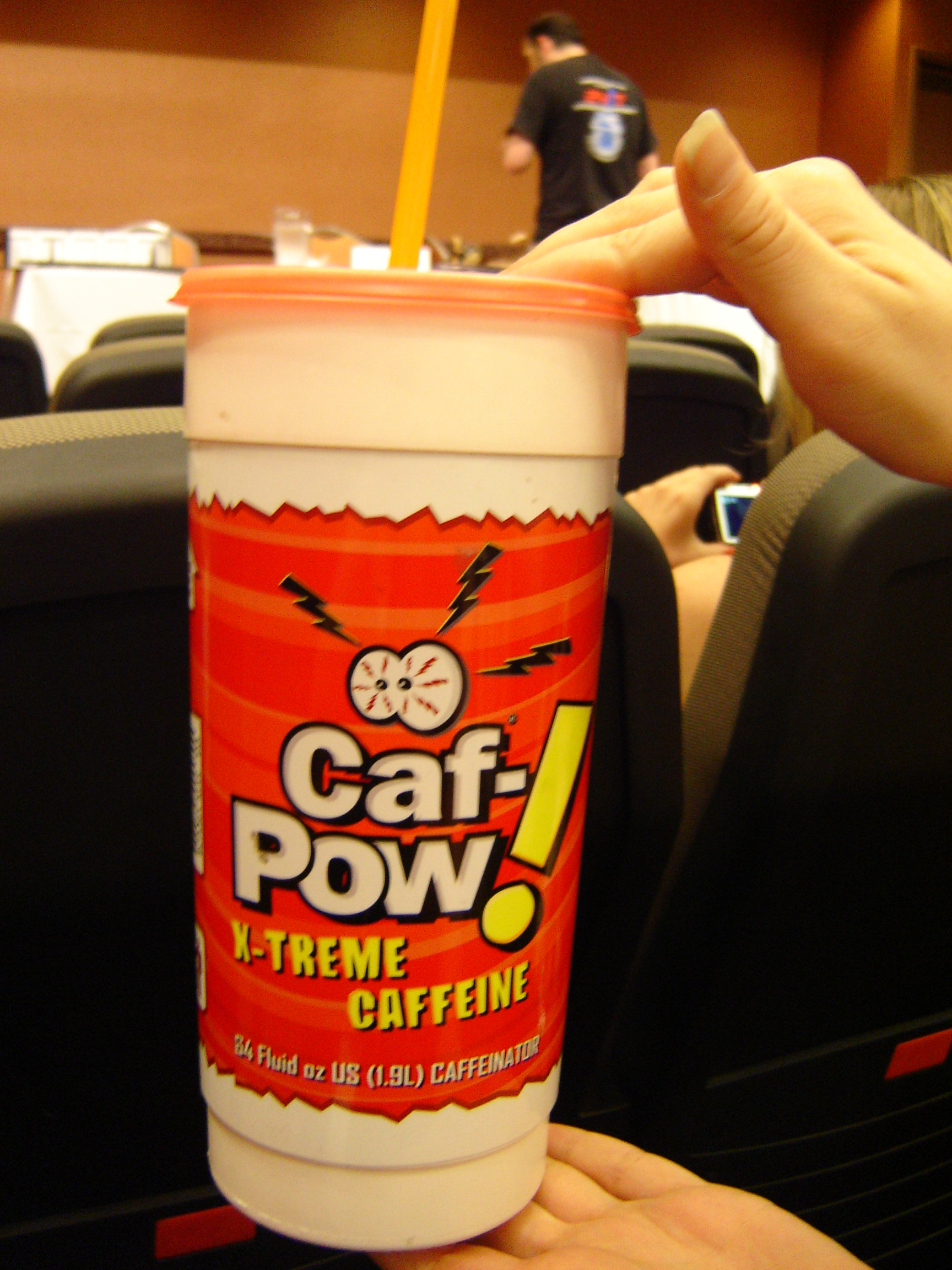
Abby's signature "Caf-Pow"

Like Gibbs, Abby enjoys caffeine, primarily in the form of large cups of a fictional drink called "Caf-Pow". At times, when she is worried about the caffeine interfering with her sleep, she drinks "No-Caf-Pow" instead. (According to Perrette, the cups were originally filled with Hawaiian Punch, but when she stopped eating and drinking refined sugar, unsweetened cranberry juice was used in its place.) When changing the artwork in her lab during "Hung Out to Dry", she states that she has a "Chagall feeling", a reference to Marc Chagall, a Jewish Belarusian artist whose main works came from fantasy and dreams. Her favorite term for something out of the ordinary is "hinky". It is also shown that she enjoys attending concerts, but her failure to wear earplugs at one of them left her with temporary hearing loss the next day, forcing her to ask DiNozzo for help analyzing some audio evidence.

Abby has shown a tendency to become very agitated, to the point of near-panic, if any of the team is seriously hurt. When Gibbs was admitted to the hospital, Abby ended up on the verge of a nervous breakdown, pacing back and forth while delivering a rambling, disjointed stream-of-consciousness plea that explained (among other things) how close Gibbs and she were, the reason she was arriving after visiting hours, how she felt about Gibbs being injured, and how important it was to her that Gibbs not die from his injuries.

Abby developed a fondness for Butch, a Navy sniffer dog, in the season five episode "Dog Tags". She renamed it "Jethro" in honor of Gibbs, because it was "handsome and quiet" like him. The dog was framed for the murder of a petty officer, as the dog was found at the murder victim's house, but Abby proved Jethro's innocence. Afterwards, Abby forced McGee to adopt the dog, much to his dismay (as Jethro had attacked him earlier in the episode). Abby would have preferred to adopt Jethro herself, but her landlord did not allow tenants to have pets.

== Character backstory ==
Sciuto is portrayed as having a happy, normal childhood. Her younger brother, Luca, was first mentioned by name in the season-nine episode "Enemy on the Hill". He appears in season 10 in a flashback. Luca was portrayed by Tyler Ritter in Season 13 NCIS: New Orleans crossover episodes "Sister City (Part I)" and "Sister City (Part II)". She also mentioned that she has a niece and that her grandmother was an Olympic swimmer who won a silver medal. She has mentioned several uncles, including one named Teddy who owned a bar, one named Horace whom she referred to as Horace "the Haggler" during an episode, and one named Larry who apparently wore knee-high socks and fanny packs. Both her parents are deceased, although when they passed is never mentioned. Abby is a hearing child adopted by deaf parents and likes her music loud. In the episode "Seadog", Gibbs tells Tony that Abby knows how to use sign language because both of her parents were deaf. Abby has stated that she dreams of visiting the Galápagos Islands, Dollywood, and Israel before she dies. Abby graduated with full honors from Louisiana State University with a triple major in sociology, criminology, and psychology. She earned her master's degree from Georgia State University in criminology and forensic science. Sciuto's interest in forensics came from living near a wrecking yard and being intrigued by the cause and effect of the wrecks. A season nine episode "Enemy on the Hill," reveals that Abby has another brother, Kyle (played by Daniel L. Rivas), who is her biological brother, as it is revealed that Abby is in fact adopted.

She appears well-versed in her field of study; she is rarely stumped by the puzzles that Gibbs' team presents to her. Abby has been shown to have skills in traditional forensics, computer forensics, and hacking. She has implied that she has a PhD in chemistry. It has been shown that she does all the work on the evidence herself. In season three, she was given an assistant named Charles "Chip" Sterling. She revolted, but eventually learned to put up with him. However, their working partnership did not last long, as Abby later discovered Sterling had framed DiNozzo for murder. Exposed, Chip threatened her with a knife; she promptly subdued him, hog-tied him with duct tape, and insisted on being allowed to work alone from then on, something to which then-Director Jenny Shepard agreed.

It has also been mentioned numerous times that she is a devout Roman Catholic and is on a bowling team with several nuns.

In the 2009 NCIS: Los Angeles episode "Random On Purpose," Abby is described as being in her late 20s, suggesting she was born in the early 1980s. (Actress Perrette was born in 1969, and was 40 when this episode first aired.) However, in a flashback in the 2013 NCIS episode "Hit and Run," Abby is shown to be 10 years old in the early 1980s, implying that she was born in the early 1970s.

=== Resignation ===
In the Season 15 episodes "One Step Forward" and "Two Steps Back", Clayton Reeves, an MI6 agent, dies protecting Abby from a hitman hired to kill her. She is severely wounded in the attempt, but recovers and tracks down the man who arranged the hit―a black-ops expert whom she had encountered several years earlier. She tricks him into believing that she has spiked his coffee with a fatal dose of cyanide, then offers to give him the antidote in exchange for his confession; the ploy succeeds and he is quickly arrested by the agents. Abby subsequently resigns from NCIS to accompany Reeves' body back to England and start a charity in honor of Reeves and his mother to help the homeless.

== Relationships ==
The character of Abby gets along well with all the rest of the team. She is very fond of Ducky, who uses her full name, Abigail. She is called Abby or Abs by almost everyone else, except Director Leon Vance, who calls her Ms. Sciuto. Abby is fiercely loyal to the team, and considers them family, which is shown by her distress when one or more of them is in serious danger. Likewise, the team are generally fond of her and describe her as "the favorite".

Before her death in the line of duty, Special Agent Caitlin "Kate" Todd was a close friend of Abby's. They often hung out after work, and Abby is one of the few characters on the show to know what Kate's tattoo actually is.

She is friendly with Medical Assistant Jimmy Palmer. She has helped him with an autopsy and Rolfed him when he injured himself in the morgue in "Life Before His Eyes". In "Newborn King", Palmer brings his future father-in-law, Ed Slater, to NCIS. Later in the episode, McGee visits Abby to see she has locked the two in the back room. Jimmy states if Slater had not made a comment about Abby's tattoo, then they would not be in time out, implying he took Abby's side. Jimmy also chose Abby to be his "best woman" at his wedding in "The Missionary Position".

In the episode "Crescent City", she is shown to have a relationship with Senior Special Agent Dwayne Cassius Pride, who runs the New Orleans NCIS office.

=== Leroy Jethro Gibbs ===
Gibbs is depicted as having a close (father/daughter-like) relationship with Abby, who is initially one of only two characters (the other one being Ducky) to have no fear of him. Gibbs is often seen giving Abby kisses on the cheek, and hugging her, especially when she does good work on her cases. He often brings her a fresh Caf-Pow when he arrives at the lab for information on a case, whether or not she has called him down to tell him about it. Gibbs generally tolerates Abby's goth dress style, knowing that she does a great job in her work, but often has to ask her to get to the point when she starts rambling. Abby sometimes turns to Gibbs when she needs to talk about something personal that is bothering her and he helps by listening to her. Both Gibbs and Abby are proficient with American Sign Language, as Abby grew up with deaf parents. On several occasions, Abby has been described as "the favorite", a fact that does not escape the rest of the team, but they do not begrudge her for it.

Gibbs is also very protective of Abby, especially when she is in very serious danger. For example, in the episode "Bloodbath", she was threatened by a hit man hired by a defendant in a case in which she was testifying, which was also complicated by an ex-boyfriend, Mikel Mawher (guest star, Vincent Young), against whom she had a restraining order, but who then called her in violation of the order. When Gibbs found out about this, he pointedly told Mikel, "The only reason you're still able to walk is because I never heard about you until today!"

Sometimes, that protectiveness extends from the rest of the team, as well. For example, in the episode "Spider and the Fly", Alejandro Rivera came to NCIS and began to threaten Abby for not sending in a report about the murder of Pedro Hernandez, Rivera's father, whom Gibbs had killed 20 years previously in revenge for Hernandez killing Gibbs' first wife, Shannon, and young daughter, Kelly. The entire team, including Ducky and Vance, ordered him to leave her alone and to not harass her, or to be escorted forcibly from NCIS Headquarters. Rivera eventually left of his own accord, but was later arrested for attempting to kill Gibbs and his father at a safehouse, and accidentally killing his sister, Paloma.

Gibbs' concern for Abby's safety is such that he will even drop his trademark cup of coffee if she is in serious danger. Twice this occurred: in the episode "Kill Ari" when Ari shot at her while she was in her lab, the other time was in the episode "Driven" when she was trapped inside an experimental Humvee, which had been rigged to fill with exhaust fumes and suffocate its occupants.

=== Ziva David ===
Abby is portrayed as cold to Ziva David upon her arrival at NCIS as she, like the rest of the team, was still grieving over Kate Todd's death and the fact that Ziva was Ari Haswari's half-sister. Abby would scribble over pictures of Ziva and frequently mispronounce her surname to annoy her. Later, upset by Ziva's calm response to Gibbs being injured in a bombing, Abby slapped her.

Abby eventually came around, and she and Ziva became good friends. This was solidified in the episode "Capitol Offense" when Ziva bought Abby a "chocoholic's choice" cupcake in gratitude for giving her a place to stay while her home was being fumigated for termites. After the cupcake unexpectedly vanished, Abby used her knowledge of forensics to prove McGee had stolen it, angering the rest of the team. Ziva flinched away from Abby's hugs at first, not understanding why she did so, but eventually came to accept them with more ease.

In the season-seven finale, Abby was shown to be present at Ziva's citizenship ceremony, along with Ducky, McGee, and Jimmy Palmer.

Later in the episode "Gone", the two bonded more when Ziva took in a teenaged girl who witnessed her father's murder and best friend's kidnapping as they both tried to help the girl feel at ease throughout the ongoing investigation.

After Ziva's father was gunned down in "Shabbat Shalom", Abby was shown baking cookies in an attempt to help her feel better.

=== Tony DiNozzo ===
Abby's relationship with Tony is a friendly one, with the two making friendly, non-hostile jibes at each other, and squabbling about various topics, such as movies and personal possessions. Abby is perhaps the only member of the NCIS cast who displays a love and knowledge of movies that even comes close to matching Tony's. In "Twilight", after Tony narrowly avoids being part of an explosion on his first day back from sick leave after getting pneumonic plague, she runs at him and hugs him so hard he nearly falls over. In the episode, "Frame-Up", she almost single-handedly unravels the forensic evidence used to frame Tony of murder to clear his name, then subdues the killer – her assistant Chip Sterling – when he threatens her with a knife. The explosion of Tony's car in "Bury Your Dead" causes her to become increasingly obsessed with her work, to prevent thoughts of his possible death. In "Reunion", after Tony, McGee, and Gibbs rescue Ziva from Somalia, Abby starts with a rant criticizing Ziva for her continuing mistrust of Tony, which, in trademarked Abby fashion, ends with her saying how worried she was about Ziva, and hugging her. This then sparks a confrontation between Tony and Ziva that causes their relationship to be restored to normal. Tony would sometimes join Abby in her lab and act like Gibbs when he was absent. When Abby was in a coma, Tony was shown to be very worried about her, to the point he did not call McGee by any last name joke.

=== Timothy McGee ===
Abby had a relationship with McGee which she stated that she would like to keep casual during season one. Although the relationship ended late in the same season, they both have exhibited jealousy when someone of the opposite sex pays attention to the other. Some erotic teasing and tension continues between the two for the next several seasons, implied through such facts as McGee's apparent ability to describe the inside of Abby's bedroom in his novel. After finding out Abby sleeps in a coffin, he said, "You told me it was a box sofa," indicating he has at least stayed over. The implications went farther when he added, "I can't believe I slept in a coffin," and she impishly replied, "Not just slept." In the episode "Bloodbath" when Abby's life is threatened and the team sends her home with McGee, Abby is revealed at one point to have kept a toothbrush at McGee's apartment.

Their flirtation became less prominent in later seasons, and TV Guide Senior Critic Matt Roush suggested this was due to the producers' apprehension about using romance within the series to an excess. He reasoned, "pairing up all four members of Gibbs' team romantically might seem like overkill, and the Tony-Ziva dynamic (even if not exactly acted upon) is so integral to the show's core that I'm not surprised they've kept McGee and Abby on more of a loving-sibling level." He further opined that he "wouldn't expect it to change".

=== Donald "Ducky" Mallard ===
Abby is called Abigail by Ducky, who addresses her by her full first name often. Though in the episode "Faking It", he thanked her and called her by using the name "Abby" instead of "Abigail". Abby used to have a fear of autopsy tables, which she shares with Ducky in episode 16 of season one, "Bête Noire", when Ducky and Kate are held hostage. The fear, although mostly overcome, can be brought back by major trauma, as seen in episode 2 of season 10.

== Appearance on NCIS: Los Angeles ==
In the NCIS: Los Angeles episode "Random on Purpose", Abby, having been previously seen on video conference or talking to someone from her lab in Washington, D.C., arrived in Los Angeles to meet the Office of Special Projects (OSP) team as she informed them she was investigating a serial killer called the Phantom who had murdered 15 people all over the country and had also left no DNA or even physical evidence at the scenes.

Having already formed a strong friendship with Eric Beale, Abby developed friendships with the OSP team, including G. Callen (Chris O'Donnell), Sam Hanna (LL Cool J), and most notably the operations manager Hetty Lange (Linda Hunt), who commented that Abby is "the first NCIS employee [she] has ever met with a sense of style". Kensi Blye, another NCIS Special Agent, who is an expert in forensics, praised Abby for her high levels of thinking, stating that she lived up to the hype.

Abby was later kidnapped by the Phantom, later revealed to be a law firm receptionist named Tom Smith, who sought to kill her to keep his identity a secret, as he hoped to go around killing more people, having developed something of a taste for it. Although Vance mentioned that Gibbs and the NCIS Major Case Response Team were en route to Los Angeles to rescue her, Abby was saved due to the efforts of the OSP team and was later seen telling Gibbs and McGee on a video-conferencing link that she was okay.

To date, Abby has not returned to Los Angeles nor has she reappeared in any video-conference calls which strongly suggests that her appearances in season one were just one-offs.

== Reception ==
During the first season of NCIS, Ross Warneke from The Age wrote of the character, "Her role is pivotal in the show because, as with so many crime series these days, the forensics laboratory is the scene of much of the action. Perrette's only shortcoming is her diction. Am I the only one who has difficulty understanding her?" In January 2005, Bill Keveney from USA Today compared the characters on NCIS to those on Magnum, P.I. and commented, "the tattooed Abby, the presumed slacker who is anything but, is Bellisario's not-what-she-appears-to-be tribute to Magnum, a functioning, well-balanced Vietnam vet who contrasted many depictions of the era." The New York Times writer Bill Carter described Abby as "television's only regular goth personality" in October of the same year.

Later in the show's run, reception continued to be mostly positive, with some critics regarding her as "easily the most outgoing and affectionate member of the group". In 2009, David Martingale of Star-Telegram wrote, "Abby Sciuto, a forensics scientist who, with her caffeine-fueled high energy and kooky Goth/cheerleader wardrobe, is one of a kind". June Thomas from Slate Magazine noted in November 2011 that, "Abby may look like a freak, but she's a church-going patriot." She has been described as "spacy" and "a witty, lovable personality with forensic skills that are even greater than her charm."

C. Coville from Cracked criticized the choice to describe Abby's age as "late twenties" in her 2009 guest appearance on NCIS: Los Angeles, finding it unbelievable for someone who "has still somehow picked up a PhD in chemistry, bachelor's degrees in sociology, criminology, and psychology, and good knowledge of hacking and computer forensic science".

In March 2011, AOL named Abby as number 95 on a list of the 100 Most Memorable Female TV Characters. In April 2013, a study by E-Poll Market Research listed Pauley Perrette and Cote de Pablo, who portrays Ziva David, among the top 10 most appealing celebrities in America. Perrette and de Pablo were ranked as numbers 5 and 3 respectively.
