= Pauley Perrette =

American actress (born 1969)

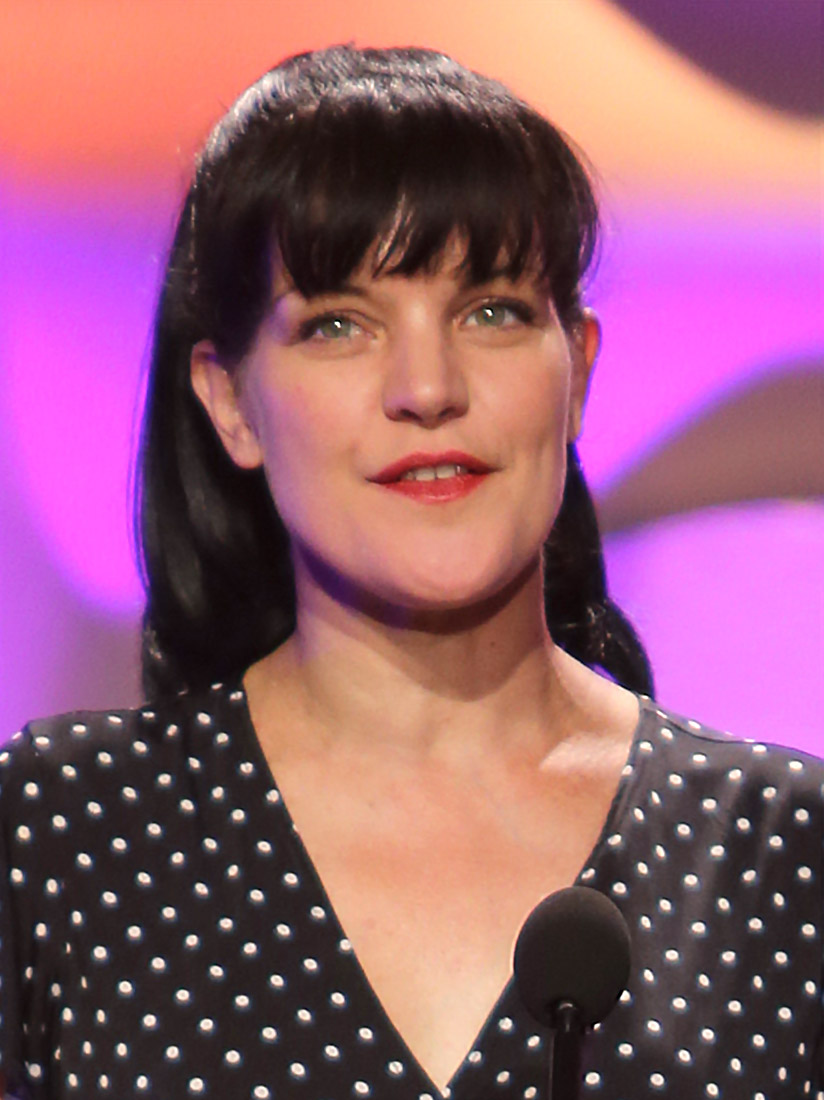
- Perrette at the 2014 AHA Hero Dog Awards
- Born: March 27, 1969 (age 57); New Orleans, Louisiana, U.S.
- Other name: Pauley P.
- Education: Valdosta State University; John Jay College of Criminal Justice
- Occupations: Actress; singer
- Years active: 1994–2020
- Spouse: Coyote Shivers (m. 2000; div. 2006)

Pauley Perrette (born March 27, 1969) is a retired American actress and singer. She played Abby Sciuto in the television series NCIS from 2003 to 2018.

== Early life ==
Perrette was born in New Orleans, Louisiana, to Paul Perrett and Donna (née Bell) Perrett and raised throughout the southern United States. She lived in Georgia, Alabama, Tennessee, North Carolina, South Carolina, New York, New Jersey, and California. In a 2011 interview with the Associated Press, Perrette confessed her early ambitions were to work with animals, be in a rock and roll band, or be an FBI agent.

Perrette attended Valdosta State University in Valdosta, Georgia, where she studied criminal justice, and later moved to New York City to study at the John Jay College of Criminal Justice. In New York, she held a variety of jobs: "Not only was I bartending in the club kids scene, with a bra and combat boots and a white Mohawk, but I also wore a sandwich board on roller skates passing out flyers for Taco Bell in the Diamond District." Perrette also worked as a cook on a Manhattan dinner cruise boat.

== Career ==
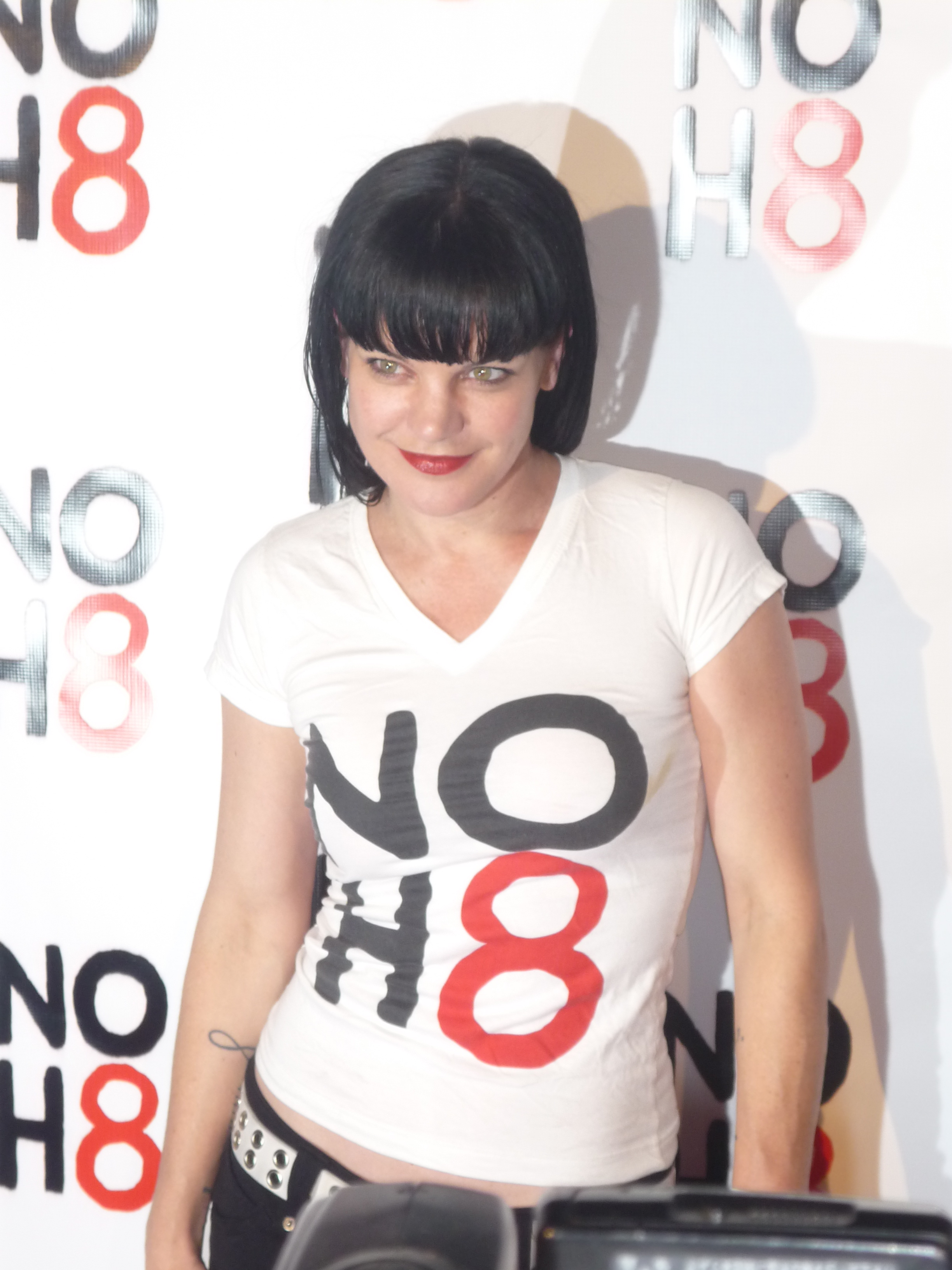
Perrette at the NOH8 Campaign in 2009

Perrette has worked in television and film, mostly doing commercials, voice-overs, music videos and short films. She worked as a bartender in New York City. While working odd jobs in New York, she was introduced by a friend to an advertising agency director. This prompted her move to Los Angeles, where she had a variety of bit parts and made several guest appearances. She appeared as a waitress at Cafe Nervosa in the sitcom Frasier during season four (in the episode "Three Dates and a Break Up"), and she guest-starred in season one of 24. She has made appearances in several films, including The Ring and Almost Famous.

In 2001, as a recurring character introduced in season two of Special Unit 2, she played Alice Cramer, the Unit's public relations person. She landed her most prominent role, that of Abby Sciuto, an eccentric forensic scientist, in NCIS, a television series based on the Naval Criminal Investigative Service. Perrette's initial appearance as the character was in two episodes of JAG aired in spring 2003, which served as a "backdoor pilot" for NCIS. She appeared as Abby in two 2009 episodes of NCIS: Los Angeles and in two episodes of NCIS: New Orleans in 2014 and 2016.

The character Abby Sciuto was created by Donald P. Bellisario, who "wanted to create ... a character who was seemingly an 'alternafreak', while portraying her as perhaps the smartest, most capable person on television. Not a junkie, killer, loser, or television stereotype." Perrette added some of her own "contributions" to the character, and also conferred with friend Clint Catalyst, the "author of Cottonmouth Kisses [who is] often brought in as a guest on TV shows when they are doing pieces on goth or alternative culture." Perrette explained that "Clint and I and our 3,000 closest friends all play together ... We've never sat around and labeled each other. Sure, there are nights when a certain event leans more towards one style than the other, but it's not like some turf war with gang colors." Like her character, Perrette has often been asked if she is goth or punk, to which her response is "Who cares?" Consequently, she told her employers that her character is not the type to seek out a label; Abby "wouldn't call herself anything but Abby ... What she represents is a smart, capable chick that cannot be reduced to a stereotype." On October 4, 2017, TV Guide reported that Perrette would be leaving the series at the end of the 15th season; she made her final appearance in the episode "Two Steps Back".

In addition to acting, Perrette is a poet and author (her short story "Cheers..." appears in the anthology Pills, Thrills, Chills, and Heartache: Adventures in the First Person). In 2007, she began production on a documentary about U.S. civil rights attorney and author Mark Lane. Entitled Citizen Lane, it was completed in 2013.

In a 2005 interview with Craig Ferguson, then host of The Late Late Show, Perrette said she has had a lifelong crime obsession. She was an undergrad student in sociology, psychology, and criminal science. She started her master's degree in criminal science before her career in the entertainment industry.

In the January/February 2010 Performer Q Score, Perrette tied in the top three alongside Tom Hanks and Morgan Freeman. She was also the only woman to make the top 10. Perrette began appearing in television commercials for Expedia.com in late 2010. She made a guest appearance as a judge on season four, episode six of RuPaul's Drag Race. As of winter 2018, her Q Score was 44, giving her the highest score of all current female television actors.

Perrette played the lead role as Jackie in the CBS sitcom Broke, which aired in 2020. In May 2020, Broke was cancelled after one season. On July 7, 2020, Perrette retired from acting.

== Music ==
Perrette recorded her song "Fear" (co-written with Tom Polce) under the name "Stop Making Friends". The song was recorded for NCIS: The Official TV Soundtrack which was released on February 10, 2009. "Fear" was featured in the NCIS episode "Aliyah" (season 6 episode 25), according to the soundtrack's website.

Prior to this, Perrette was the lead singer in the Los Angeles-based all-female band Lo-Ball, using the stage name "Pauley P." The song "Can't Get Me Down" by Lo-Ball is heard in the film Legally Blonde. Perrette appeared in "The Unnamed Feeling" video for heavy metal band Metallica from their album St. Anger. In 2011, Perrette was the featured vocalist on a song called "Fire in Your Eyes" by B. Taylor, a Las Vegas-based hip-hop artist. She also sang on the 2011 single "Attention Please" by DMC.

== Personal life ==
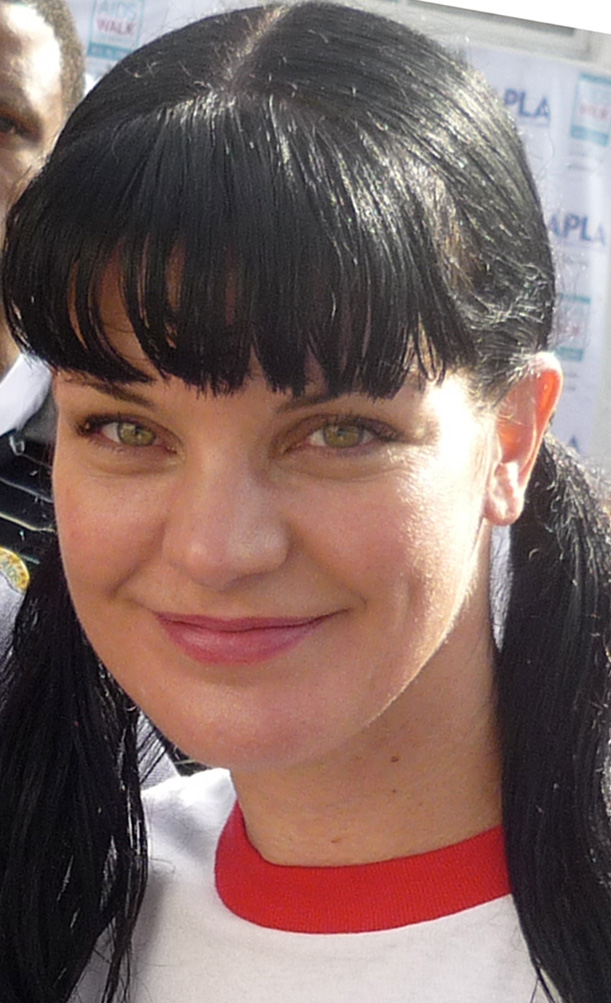
Perrette in 2009

Perrette married Canadian actor and musician Coyote Shivers in 2000; the couple separated four years later, with their divorce becoming final in 2006. She was granted restraining orders against him, alleging that he subjected her to physical, emotional, and sexual abuse during and after their marriage.

Perrette worked with America's Most Wanted in February 2004 to present the city of Prattville, Alabama, with a check for $10,000, to be used to supplement the reward offer for information leading to the arrest of the person who killed Shannon Paulk. Paulk was from Prattville, near where Perrette had once lived as a child. Perrette also donated $10,000 to Detroit law enforcement officials in 2007 to be used as a reward for information regarding the disappearance/murder of Raven Jeffries, a seven-year-old Detroit girl. (Perrette's then-partner was from Detroit.) The story originally aired on America's Most Wanted on September 8, 2007, on Fox. She also asked them for help in finding the person(s) who killed her friend Lisa Williamson, who was murdered in 2007 after her Detroit home was set on fire. In 2009, Perrette worked with America's Most Wanted on the case of Tammy Vincent.

Perrette supports many charitable organizations, including animal rescue organizations, the American Red Cross, civil rights organizations, and LGBT rights organizations. Perrette opposed the California ballot initiative Proposition 8 in 2008, writing a public letter in the fall of that year urging votes against the measure. She is a member of the Hollywood United Methodist Church.

She dated cameraman Michael Bosman for four years before their engagement; however, the two did not marry, saying they would wait until everyone can get married in the United States. They instead filed for all the legal protections that are available to same-sex couples. Bosman did not propose until the legalization of same-sex marriage in California in June 2008. The couple campaigned very publicly against Proposition 8. Perrette and Bosman split, and in December 2011 she announced her engagement to former British Royal Marine Thomas Arklie. She had again announced that the couple would not marry until Proposition 8 is invalidated.

Perrette, who is a natural blonde, was hospitalized in 2014 after "a severe allergic reaction to her [character's] trademark ink-black [hair] color." She told CBS News in Los Angeles that her face had swollen to twice its size and warned that "anyone out there [who] dyes their hair, particularly black, you need to be aware of the symptoms."

On November 12, 2015, Perrette was assaulted by a homeless man outside her Hollywood Hills home. Los Angeles Police arrested and charged the suspect with felony battery. Perrette later told Entertainment Tonight that she does not blame her attacker nor does she hold ill will against him.

Perrette co-owned Donna Bell's Bake Shop, named for her mother, in Manhattan, New York City. The shop closed in December 2020 after nearly 10 years of business.

On June 7, 2019, Perrette said she left NCIS due to an on-set dog-biting incident and alleged multiple physical assaults. She also stated that she was "terrified" of her former co-star Mark Harmon.

Perrette defended NCIS costar Michael Weatherly after he had been accused of sexual harassment by Eliza Dushku.

In September 2022, Perrette revealed that she had suffered a stroke in September 2021.

== Filmography ==
=== Film ===
Year	Title	Role	Notes
1997	The Price of Kissing	Renee	
1998	Hand on the Pump	Hi-Girl	
1998	Hoofboy		Short film
2000	Civility	Carolyn	
2000	Almost Famous	Alice Wisdom	
2001	My First Mister	Bebe	
2002	The Ring	Beth	
2002	Red Skies	Patty Peirson	
2002	Hungry Hearts	Cokie Conner	
2003	Ash Tuesday	Gina Mascara	
2003	Brother Bear	Female Lover Bear	Voice
2004	Cut and Run	Jolene	
2004	A Moment of Grace	Dr. Grace Peters	
2005	Potheads: The Movie	LuLu	
2008	The Singularity Is Near	Ramona	
2010	Satan Hates You	Marie Flowers	
2011	Pride	Angela	Short film
2012	I Am Bad	Mom	
2012	Superman vs. The Elite	Lois Lane	Voice, direct-to-video
2013	Citizen Lane	Self	Documentary; also director, writer, executive producer
2015	Scooby-Doo! and Kiss: Rock and Roll Mystery	Delilah Domino / The Crimson Witch	Voice, direct-to-video

=== Television ===
Year	Title	Role	Notes	
1994	ABC Afterschool Specials	Shannon	Episode: "Magical Make Over"	
1996–97	Murder One	Gwen	Main role (season 2)	
1996	Frasier	Waitress	2 episodes (credited as Pauley P.)	
1997	Early Edition	Theresa Laparco	Episode: "Mob Wife" (credited as Pauley P.)	
1998	That's Life	Lisa	Main role	
1998	The Naked Truth	Ilana	Episode: "The Seer and the Sucker"	
1998	The Drew Carey Show	Darcy	4 episodes	
1999	Batman Beyond	Cop, Dottie (uncredited)	Voice, episode: "Golem"	
1999	Jesse	Gwen	3 episodes	
1999	Veronica's Closet	Nicole	Episode: "Veronica's Little Ruse"	
1999–2000	Time of Your Life	Cecilia Wiznarksi	Main role	
2001	Smash	Charley	Unknown episodes	
2001	Dead Last	Erica	Episode: "Death Is in the Air"	
2001	Philly	Angela	Episode: "Light My Fire"	
2001	Dawson's Creek	Rachel Weir, Ph.D.	2 episodes	
2001	2001–02	Special Unit 2	Alice Cramer	Recurring role; 4 episodes
2002	24	Tanya	2 episodes	
2002	Haunted	Nadine	Episode: "Fidelity"	
2003	CSI: Crime Scene Investigation	Candeece	Episode: "Lady Heather's Box"	
2003	JAG	Abby Sciuto	2 episodes	
2003–18	NCIS	Abby Sciuto	Main role (seasons 1–15); 352 episodes	
2009	NCIS: Los Angeles	Abby Sciuto	2 episodes	
2014, 2016	NCIS: New Orleans	Abby Sciuto	2 episodes	
2017	When We Rise	Robin	Episode: "Night IV: Part VI and VII"	
2020	Broke	Jackie	Main role; 13 episodes	

=== Video games ===
Year	Title	Role	Notes
1997	Blade Runner	Lucy Devlin	

=== Filmmaking credits ===
Year	Title	Role	Notes
2001	The American Shame	Associate producer	
2013	Citizen Lane	Director	Also writer and executive producer
2015	An Act of Love	Executive producer	
2019	The German King	Executive producer	
2023	Studio One Forever	Executive producer	
2023	Red Ribbons of Love	Director	

== Awards and nominations ==
Year	Association	Category	Work	Result	Ref.
2014	People's Choice Awards	Favorite Dramatic TV Actress	NCIS	Nominated	
2016	People's Choice Awards	Favorite Crime Drama TV Actress	NCIS	Nominated	
2016	BTVA Special/DVD Voice Acting Awards	Best Female Vocal Performance in a TV Special/Direct-to-DVD Title or Theatrical Short	Scooby-Doo! And Kiss: Rock and Roll Mystery	Nominated	
2017	People's Choice Awards	Favorite Crime Drama TV Actress	NCIS	Nominated	
