= Steven D. Binder =

American screenwriter

Steven D. Binder (born July 23, 1971) is an American screenwriter and film and television producer. He currently works on NCIS as a writer, executive producer, and showrunner. In addition, he is featured in the documentary, Journey to the Flames: 10 Years of Burning Man. He is both a battery tech patent holder and an iOS software developer. He is brothers with entrepreneur Jeff Binder.

== Filmography ==
- Eating L.A.
- The Invisible Man (2000 TV series)
- Tremors (TV series)
- The Dead Zone (TV series)
- Journey to the Flames: 10 Years of Burning Man
- National Lampoon's Totally Baked: A Potumentary
- NCIS (TV series)
