= Leroy Jethro Gibbs =

Fictional character in the television series NCIS

L. Jethro Gibbs
- NCIS character
- Mark Harmon as Leroy Jethro Gibbs
- First appearance: "Ice Queen" (JAG)
- Portrayed by: Mark Harmon; Austin Stowell (young adult); Sean Harmon (young adult); Micah Tayloe Owens (child); Beckett Blomberg (child)
- Voiced by: Josh Robert Thompson (NCIS: The Video Game)

In-universe information
- Gender: Male
- Occupation: NCIS Special Agent (retired); Gunnery Sergeant (Marine sniper and military police) (USMC) (reservist/separated)
- Affiliation: NCIS
- Family: Jackson Gibbs (father, deceased); Ann Gibbs (mother, deceased)
- Spouses: Shannon Fielding Gibbs (deceased); Diane Sterling (divorced, deceased); Rebecca Chase (divorced); Stephanie Flynn (divorced); Ellen Wallace (ex-fiancée, deceased)
- Children: Kelly Gibbs (deceased)
- Nationality: American

Career at NCIS
- Position: Acting Director (temporarily); Special Agent in Charge, Major Case Response Team, Washington, D.C. office; Undercover operative, Europe; Agent Afloat; Senior Field Agent; Field Agent, NCIS Fed Five; Probationary Field Agent, NIS Camp Pendleton Field Office
- Rank: Special Agent in Charge
- Years of Service: October 1991–2021
- Awards: Silver Star, Purple Heart, Navy Meritorious Civilian Service Award

Leroy Jethro Gibbs (born November 21, 1954) is a fictional character and the original protagonist of the CBS TV series NCIS, portrayed by Mark Harmon in the original series and by Austin Stowell in the prequel series NCIS: Origins. He is a former U.S. Marine Corps Scout Sniper turned special agent who commands a team for the Naval Criminal Investigative Service (NCIS)

Gibbs is the most accomplished marksman on the team and the most skilled at handling violent standoffs; he depends on his other agents heavily for technical forensics and background checks. He is patient but firm with his team and has little patience for bureaucracy; he commands most other main characters—including his current staff Timothy McGee, Nick Torres and, briefly, Jessica Knight and previous staff Caitlin Todd (killed in the line of duty), Anthony DiNozzo (left to look after his newly found daughter), Ziva David (presumed as killed after leaving NCIS; later revealed to have gone into hiding), Alexandra Quinn (left to look after her sick mother), Clayton Reeves (killed while defending Abby Sciuto), Ellie Bishop (left presumably for a CIA undercover mission with Odette Malone) and Jacqueline Sloane (left to pursue humanitarian work in Afghanistan). Having found peace in Alaska for the first time since his family's death, Gibbs leaves NCIS in the 2021 episode "Great Wide Open" in search of adventure.

Since 2024, Austin Stowell has starred as a younger Gibbs in the prequel series NCIS: Origins.

== Development and casting ==
Series creator Donald P. Bellisario initially did not think Mark Harmon would fit the role of Gibbs, a "flinty type with a strong sense of honor and respect for the military", but changed his mind after viewing a tape of Harmon's portrayal of a Secret Service agent on The West Wing. Co-executive producer Charles Floyd Johnson recalls, "We all looked at that work. And everybody said, 'He's Gibbs.'" The production also considered Harrison Ford, Scott Glenn, Kevin Bacon, Chris Cooper, Alec Baldwin, Val Kilmer, Clive Owen, Tom Berenger, Charlie Sheen, Aidan Quinn, and Patrick Swayze; with Glenn being strongly considered. Harmon was cast in 2003, and Bellisario explained, "I said, 'Oh, my God, he's Gibbs.' He had matured. He's good-looking in a totally different way than he was as a young guy." At another point, he said, "I am so lucky to have Mark Harmon as the lead. You have no idea. This cast is gold. Mark Harmon is a Middle American guy, even if he was raised in Southern California. His values are exactly the same as mine."

Harmon said of his character, "I was attracted by [his] flaws. He has lousy taste in women. He's addicted to coffee."

Gibbs was initially written as "not too far removed" from characters like Dr. Robert "Bobby" Caldwell and Dr. Jack McNeil, both previous roles by Harmon. In an early episode, Gibbs "playfully smacked Weatherly's DiNozzo on the back of the head" resulting in the trademark "headslap" that later appeared in many episodes throughout the seasons.

In later years, he is scripted as more stoic, with Bellisario stating, "I thought the best thing to do was to give him a minimum of dialogue." It was not until the third season that the backstory surrounding his first wife and daughter's murder was revealed. His relationships with his coworkers were developed, with him becoming something of a father figure to Special Agents Anthony DiNozzo and Ziva David and Forensic Specialist Abby Sciuto.

Mark Harmon's oldest son Sean has appeared on NCIS portraying a younger version of Gibbs in flashbacks.

== Fictional character biography ==
In the backstory, Gibbs was born on November 21, 1954, and was shown in the episode "Heartland" to have grown up in Stillwater, Pennsylvania. His father, Jackson Gibbs, owned and ran the Stillwater General Store. Gibbs' mother died of suicide when he was 14, driven by a diagnosis of cancer. Gibbs is described as a teenage delinquent before joining the Marine Corps. Gibbs is described as serving in Panama and in the Gulf War. Leaving the Marines in the early 1990s, Gibbs joins NCIS. The character is mentored by Mike Franks before becoming the head of his own NCIS team, which he leads for most of the series.

== Personality ==
Gibbs is a highly skilled marksman with both his agency-issued SIG Sauer P228 pistol (which he replaces with a .45 Colt M1911A1 pistol in Season 15) and M40A1 sniper rifle.

In the season 7 premiere, "Truth or Consequences", he kills the terrorists holding his team hostage from an exceptionally long distance and in "South by Southwest" he outshoots a professional hit-man in an approaching helicopter. His knowledge of the Marine Corps and training as a sniper often comes into use, as shown in the episodes "Ravenous", "Vanished" and "Twenty Klicks" where he uses his wilderness tracking skills and marksmanship to aid the investigation and/or get the team out of trouble.

Gibbs is a private man of few words who discloses little to nothing about his personal life. He avoids discussing his life or past before he joined NCIS, especially to agents and co-workers under him, which leads to his team members constantly speculating over his private life. Aside from his tendency to use military slang, he rarely mentions or speaks at length about his time in the Marine Corps although he is often referred to as "Gunny" by Navy and Marine officers, occasionally dons a "USMC" hoodie or T-shirt when off duty and has a replica of the iconic Raising the Flag on Iwo Jima photograph framed and mounted above the fireplace in his home.

Gibbs holds service personnel in the armed forces in high esteem and to a higher standard. He becomes particularly indignant when the guilty party is someone in a position of trust and authority, and he reacts violently on several occasions when apprehending corrupt high-ranking officers who committed crimes for monetary gain.

== Relationships ==
=== Family ===
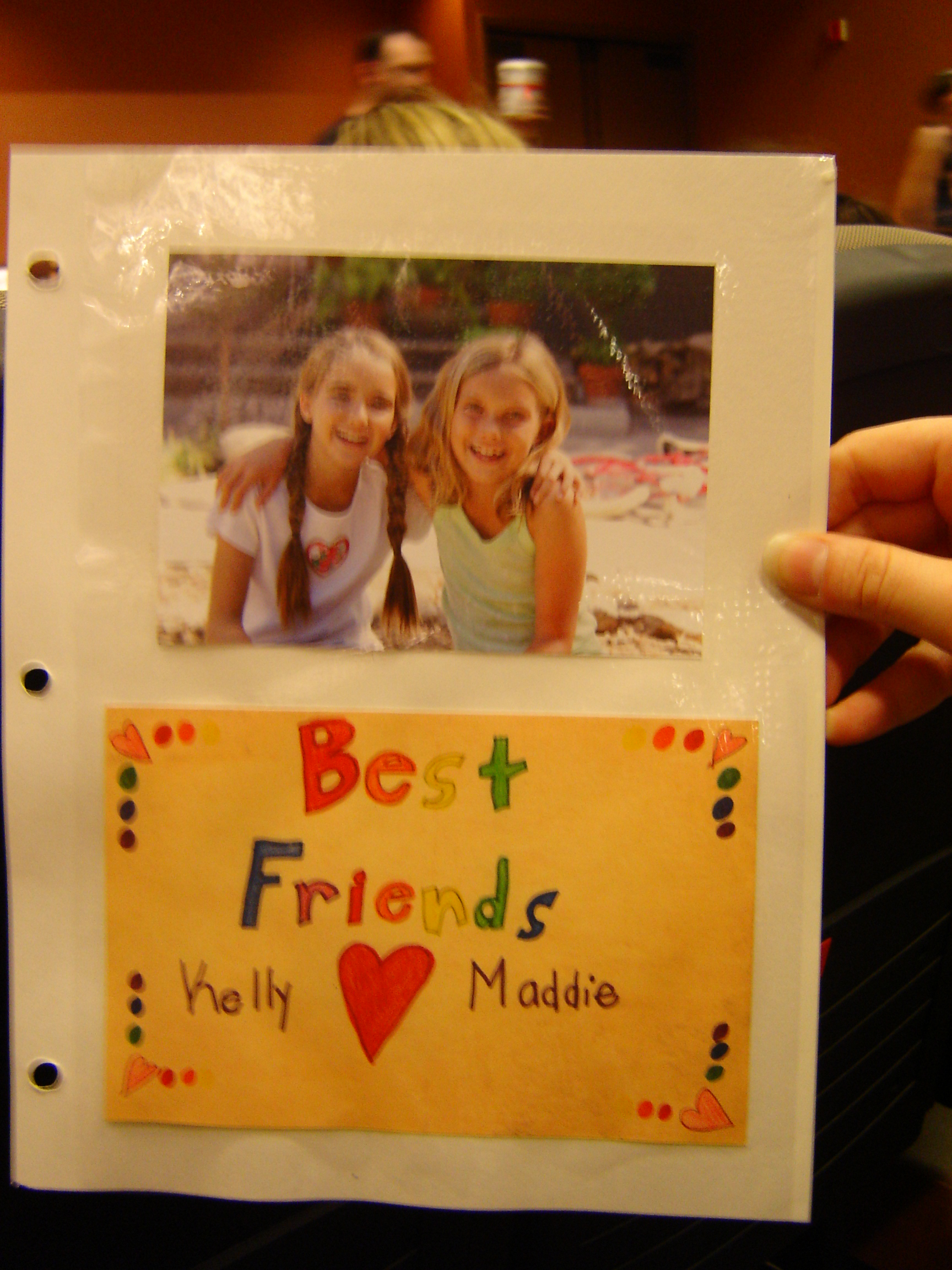
Gibbs' daughter, Kelly, and her best friend, Maddie.

In the season 6 episode "Heartland", Gibbs' frosty relationship with his father Jackson and the backstory behind it is revealed. His father had rarely been mentioned up to that point and Jackson had not known that Gibbs was a "boss" until Gibbs and his team visited Stillwater to investigate a case. By the end of the episode, they make amends and the two have become closer ever since.

=== Marriages ===
Gibbs has been married four times, and divorced three (his first wife was killed).

- Shannon Fielding was Gibbs' first wife. In the episode "Heartland", Gibbs is revealed by flashbacks to have met Shannon (portrayed in that episode by Aviva Baumann) while waiting at the Stillwater train platform in summer of 1976, where she tells him about her rules for life that would inspire a similar set of Gibbs' own that he now teaches to his subordinate agents at NCIS. In "Hiatus (Part II)", they were stated to have married in December 1982, and Kelly was born sometime in 1984. He was unable to be at the birth of Kelly as he was deployed. Shannon, along with their eight-year-old daughter Kelly, was murdered by a Mexican drug dealer named Pedro Hernandez on the last official day of Operation Desert Storm. Gibbs was an active member of the Marine Corps at the time and was still overseas when they were killed. In "Hiatus (Part II)" Director Shepard tells Dr. Donald "Ducky" Mallard that Shannon had witnessed a murder of a Marine at Camp Pendleton, where Gibbs was based at that time. Shannon had identified the murderer as Mexican-born drug dealer Pedro Hernandez. Afterwards, Hernandez shot the NIS agent driving Shannon and Kelly in a minivan and the subsequent crash took their lives. Gibbs retaliated by seeking out Pedro and assassinating him, leaving behind an empty shell casing as a message. Paloma Reynosa later indicated he left a live round. This secret remained with him for 20 years until it came to light when Abby discovered the truth through a forensic investigation.
- Diane Sterling (Melinda McGraw) was Gibbs' second wife. After divorcing Gibbs she married FBI Senior Special Agent Tobias Fornell (Joe Spano). However, this marriage was only slightly more positive than her last, and ultimately failed. As she did with Gibbs, Diane drained Fornell's bank account when she left him. Fornell and Diane have a daughter, Emily, who dies of a drug overdose in Season 18. In the season 9 episode "Devil's Triangle", Gibbs tells Diane that he liked her—he always liked her, and still likes her. Diane tells him their marriage fell apart because she was in love with him, but she could not compete with Shannon. She later asks Gibbs and Fornell to save her third husband Victor. It was later revealed that she invited Gibbs and Fornell to the wedding but they did not attend, although Gibbs did send a wedding present (a waffle iron). During the Season 12 episode "Check", Diane is shown on good terms with his other ex, Rebecca, due to their mutual enjoyment of picking on Gibbs. She is later shot dead by terrorist Sergei Mishnev (Alex Veadov). Gibbs flew into a rage and beat Mishnev but he was able to escape. Gibbs later allows Tobias Fornell (Diane's second ex-husband) to avenge Diane's death.
- Stephanie Flynn (Kathleen York), Gibbs' third, also a redhead, lived with him during his service in Moscow, Russia, for about a year. According to Gibbs, she was the one who left him. She is also said in the Season 1 episode, "Hung Out to Dry", to get drunk and dial Gibbs incessantly on the day of their former wedding anniversary, which leads him to aggressively disable or even ruin his phones to shut her out. She is introduced in Season 5 "Ex-Files", when her new boyfriend is accused of murder. As with his other exes, Stephanie is hostile with him and he finds his patience tested when seeing her speak to his current girlfriend. However, at the end, the pair reconcile after she discovers her boyfriend was innocent but cheating on her, and she gives Gibbs back his military dog tags that she held onto. She moves to Philadelphia to care for her aging parents and help her sister with her nieces and nephews.
- Rebecca Chase (Jeri Ryan), Gibbs' fourth wife, is introduced in season 12. She and Gibbs divorced because Rebecca cheated on Gibbs and it is revealed in that season's episode 11 that she is marrying the man with whom she cheated on Gibbs and it was shown that the latter had no idea of her marriage to Gibbs when they got together. She is shown on good terms with his other ex, Diane, due to their enjoyment of picking on Gibbs. She tries to make amends with Gibbs, who is initially uninterested but they do end up talking.

=== Other romantic relationships ===
After Shannon and Kelly's deaths and before he married his second wife, it is suggested that Gibbs had an affair with a woman named Rose Tamayo in Colombia. He was on a classified drug interdiction mission as a Marine Scout Sniper, and was wounded during the mission. In "Deliverance", Rose's now-adult son Tomas is introduced as a person of interest in a case. Gibbs' team suspected that he was the boy's father, but Gibbs later reveals to Tomas that Rose was already pregnant when Gibbs came to their village. It is later revealed that the drug lord Gibbs was sent to assassinate was the boy's father.

Gibbs also had a past romantic relationship with the (now deceased) director of NCIS, Jenny Shepard, who was also his partner at the time. Jenny was also a redhead. In the first, second, and third seasons, he was seen in the company of a mysterious (and never-identified) redheaded woman. According to Bellisario, the purpose of "the mysterious redhead" was "to make everyone speculate".

In season four, he has a steady, serious relationship with Army CID commander Lt. Col. Hollis Mann (Susanna Thompson), but their relationship is revealed to be over at the beginning of season five.

In season 7, Gibbs meets lawyer Margaret Allison Hart (Rena Sofer), who worked for an old enemy of Gibbs, Col. Merton Bell. Although Gibbs and Hart oppose each other over several cases, they are also attracted to one another. When it was discovered that Bell was responsible for the death of Lara Macy in connection with the long-ago murder of Pedro Hernandez, Hart turned her back on Bell, showing her allegiance to Gibbs.

In season 9, Gibbs begins a romance with Dr. Samantha Ryan (Jamie Lee Curtis), a psychologist with the DOD PsyOps, who has collaborated with his team in several episodes.

The season 16 episode "Hail and Farewell" revealed that Gibbs was also engaged to a fifth woman, Ellen Wallace, who was thought to have died in the September 11 attacks, but was murdered the night before; Gibbs broke off the engagement about two months before her death.

Since her introduction in the series in season 15 episode 4, forensic psychologist Jack Sloane (Maria Bello) has shared a close bond with Gibbs, to the point that the other team members question if Gibbs and Sloane have "a thing". The two share a kiss in Sloane's final episode (season 18 episode 8).

== Awards and citations ==
At the end of the episode "Murder 2.0", Gibbs was awarded his seventh Navy Meritorious Civilian Service Award, but as with the other six times, he did not attend the award ceremony and Tony accepts the medal on his behalf. When Gibbs shows no interest in it, Tony locks it in a box containing several similar presentation cases, all of which were awarded to Gibbs. One of these medals is revealed to have been a Silver Star, which Gibbs bestows on Corporal Damon Werth in the episode "Corporal Punishment". It is revealed in the episode "Hiatus Pt. 1" that Gibbs received the Purple Heart after being injured in Operation Desert Storm during the Gulf War and was in a coma for nineteen days as a result.

Gibbs was shown wearing the following awards and decorations in the episodes "One Shot, One Kill" and "Honor Code". Note: The Navy Meritorious Civilian Service Medal ribbon is placed as a U.S. non-military personal decoration after U.S. military unit awards in the order of precedence.

Full list

Awards and citations, as worn
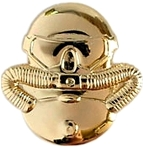

Awards and citations
Combatant Diver Insignia
US Navy and Marine Corps Parachutist Insignia
Silver Star	Purple Heart	Navy and Marine Corps; Commendation Medal with two stars
Combat Action Ribbon	Navy Unit Commendation	Meritorious Unit Commendation with one star
Navy Meritorious Civilian Service Award with six stars	Marine Corps Good Conduct Medal with five stars	Marine Corps Expeditionary Medal
National Defense Service Medal with one star	Armed Forces Expeditionary Medal	Southwest Asia Service Medal with one star
Humanitarian Service Medal	Sea Service Deployment Ribbon with three stars	Overseas Service Ribbon with one star
United Nations Truce Supervisory; Organization (UNTSO) Medal	Kuwait Liberation Medal (Saudi Arabia)	Kuwait Liberation Medal (Kuwait)

== Gibbs' rules ==
In the episode "Heartland", Gibbs is revealed by flashbacks to have met his first wife, Shannon (portrayed in that episode by Aviva Baumann), while waiting at the Stillwater train platform in summer of 1976, where she tells him about her rules for life that would inspire a similar set of Gibbs' own that he now teaches to his subordinate agents at NCIS – his own series of around fifty rules that he now lives by (with the rules in the forties and above supposedly used for emergency situations).

== Reception ==
Early reception was primarily positive. During NCIS' first season on air, Ross Warneke wrote of Gibbs, "He's still wincing from three failed marriages and is a bit of a renegade within the service." He further called Mark Harmon's performance "convincing" and added that the character "has a heart of gold". Two years later, in November 2005, Noel Holston from the Sun-Sentinel said, "NCIS special agent, Jethro Gibbs, is one of those hard-shelled, soft-centered guys' guys Bellisario loves to write, a clear-thinking, decisive leader in whose crankiness his subordinates take an almost masochistic pleasure."

William Bradly of The Huffington Post wrote an opinion piece in 2011 in response to NCIS being voted America's favorite television show in which he commented, "Gibbs is a hard-ass, but a very nice hard-ass, who usually has all the answers thanks to his well-honed 'gut.' And when he doesn't, the quirky science nerds are there to help him out in their reassuringly civvy ways."

One reviewer wrote a long analysis:

Never, have I seen a show portray such an accurate description of leadership. Agent Jethro Gibbs is a very intimidating leader; to his agents, and to his suspects. No one wants to mess with Gibbs, and that is no surprise. He is incredibly strong emotionally, and a very loving person to his family. His top qualities are leadership and fearlessness. Gibbs is also very impatient, and easily angered, which don't serve him well in his relationships.

Leadership is Gibbs' best quality. On the outside, he is tough as nails, seemingly impossible to break. On the inside, he is a compassionate person, who is extremely supportive of his friends and family.

In 2011, June Thomas from Slate magazine wrote, "Team leader Gibbs (Mark Harmon) is a coffee-slurping stoic, a former Marine often exasperated by his sometimes-silly underlings." She also discussed the show and its characters' appeal to conservatives: "They're intelligent, hard-working, and devoted...Gibbs is an old-fashioned man: strong and silent, a skilled woodworker who doesn't lock his front door." Alyssa Rosenberg of the Washington Monthly also suggested that Gibbs, "a former Marine with a Bush-like faith in his 'gut'", appeared as a distinctly conservative figure in the series, in contrast to "liberal stand-ins" McGee and Abby Sciuto.

In 2011, it was reported that the role had made Mark Harmon the fourth most popular actor on primetime television. Several other members of the NCIS cast were also listed in the top ten, including Pauley Perrette (Abby Sciuto), Cote de Pablo (Ziva David), David McCallum (Ducky Mallard), and Michael Weatherly (Anthony DiNozzo).
