= NCIS season 10 =

Season of television series

NCIS
- Season 10
- Season 10 U.S. DVD cover
- Starring: Mark Harmon; Michael Weatherly; Cote de Pablo; Pauley Perrette; Sean Murray; Brian Dietzen; Rocky Carroll; David McCallum
- No. of episodes: 24

Release
- Original network: CBS
- Original release: September 25, 2012 – May 14, 2013

Season chronology
- ← Previous; Season 9 Next → Season 11

The tenth season of NCIS an American police procedural drama series originally aired on CBS from September 25, 2012, through May 14, 2013. The season was produced by Belisarius Productions and CBS Television Studios.

== Cast and characters ==
=== Main ===
- Mark Harmon as Leroy Jethro Gibbs, NCIS Supervisory Special Agent (SSA) of the Major Case Response Team (MCRT) assigned to Washington's Navy Yard
- Michael Weatherly as Anthony DiNozzo, NCIS Senior Special Agent, Second in Command of MCRT
- Cote de Pablo as Ziva David, NCIS Special Agent
- Pauley Perrette as Abby Sciuto, Forensic Specialist for NCIS
- Sean Murray as Timothy McGee, NCIS Special Agent
- Brian Dietzen as Jimmy Palmer, Assistant Medical Examiner for NCIS
- Rocky Carroll as Leon Vance, NCIS Director
- David McCallum as Dr. Donald "Ducky" Mallard, Chief Medical Examiner for NCIS

=== Recurring ===
- Alan Dale as Thomas Morrow, Homeland Security Section Chief and former NCIS Director
- Joe Spano as Tobias Fornell, FBI Senior Special Agent
- Joel Gretsch as Stan Burley, NCIS Special Agent Afloat on the USS Borealis and former member of Gibbs' team
- Michael Nouri as Eli David, Mossad Director and Ziva's father
- Ralph Waite as Jackson Gibbs, Gibbs' father
- Paula Newsome as Jackie Vance, Leon Vance's wife
- Robert Wagner as Anthony DiNozzo, Sr., Tony's father
- Diane Neal as Abigail Borin, CGIS Special Agent in Charge
- Matt Craven as Clayton Jarvis, Secretary of the Navy
- Akinsola Aribo as Jared Vance, Leon Vance's son
- Kiara Muhammad as Kayla Vance, Leon Vance's daughter
- Daniel Louis Rivas as Kyle Davis, Abby's brother
- Melinda McGraw as Diane Sterling, Gibbs' and Fornell's ex-wife
- Matt L. Jones as Ned Dorneget, NCIS Special Agent
- Richard Schiff as Harper Dearing, NCIS target
- Gabi Coccio as young Ziva David
- Greg Germann as Jerome Craig, NCIS Assistant Director
- Oded Fehr as Ilan Bodnar, NCIS target
- Marina Sirtis as Orli Elbaz, new Mossad Director
- Damon Dayoub as Adam Eshel, Ziva's contact
- Colin Hanks as Richard Parsons, DoD Inspector

=== Guests ===
- Muse Watson as Mike Franks, deceased retired Senior Special Agent for NCIS and Gibbs' former boss
- Michael Des Barres as Del Finney
- Amanda Walsh as Ellen Roberts
- René Auberjonois as Dr. Felix Blackwell
- Linda Park as JAG Lieutenant Nora Patel
- Billy Dee Williams as Leroy Jethro Moore
- Alex Kingston as Miranda Pennebaker
- Kirsten Prout as Lydia Wade
- Blake Robbins as Commander Scott Martin
- Jenny Cooper as Connie Martin
- Drew Powell as Fred Hadley
- John M. Jackson as A. J. Chegwidden, lawyer, and former Judge Advocate General
- Jamey Sheridan as Admiral John McGee, McGee's father

== Episodes ==
No. overall	No. in season	Title	Directed by	Written by	Original release date	Prod. code	U.S. viewers (millions)
211	1	"Extreme Prejudice"	Tony Wharmby	Gary Glasberg	September 25, 2012	925	20.48
Part 5 of 5 : NCIS and the FBI hunt down Harper Dearing after being ordered by the President to "terminate him with extreme prejudice" while the team struggle to come to terms with the aftermath of the Navy Yard bombing (in "Till Death Do Us Part").
212	2	"Recovery"	Dennis Smith	Scott Williams	October 2, 2012	926	18.87
When the body of an NCIS worker is found months after the bombing, the team tries to determine her role in the attack.
213	3	"Phoenix"	Terrence O'Hara	Steven D. Binder	October 9, 2012	927	18.51
Whilst on medical leave Ducky begins to have doubts about a case he worked on twelve years previously. After exhuming the body, a link is found with the current case the team are working on, leading Gibbs to place Ducky on point under rule #38.
214	4	"Lost at Sea"	Tony Wharmby	Christopher J. Waild	October 23, 2012	928	17.78
When the crew of a helicopter that crashed at sea washes ashore four days after it went down, NCIS are given the task of investigating what happened and, more importantly, why CGIS agent Abigail Borin is also investigating the crash.
215	5	"The Namesake"	Arvin Brown	George Schenck & Frank Cardea	October 30, 2012	1001	18.83
The violent shooting of a petty officer leads the team to a Medal of Honor recipient who is also the best friend of Gibbs' father. This episode is dedicated to the Montford Point Marines honored with the Congressional Gold Medal June 27, 2012.
216	6	"Shell Shock"	Leslie Libman	Nicole Mirante-Matthews	November 13, 2012	1002	17.05
217	7	"Shell Shock"	Thomas J. Wright	Gina Lucita Monreal	November 20, 2012	1003	16.47
A Marine is murdered in a brutal gang bashing and Gibbs must reach out to the only witness, a soldier suffering from post-traumatic stress disorder. He makes it his personal mission to help a Marine suffering post-traumatic stress disorder to catch a domestic terrorist while the rest of the team race against the clock to find out who the target is.
218	8	"Gone"	James Whitmore Jr.	Teleplay by : Scott Williams; Story by : Reed Steiner	November 27, 2012	1004	19.76
The team works to find a missing girl, after a Naval officer is murdered with his daughter, the friend of the missing teenager, as a witness; Ziva takes in the young girl as her mother is overseas.
219	9	"Devil's Trifecta"	Arvin Brown	Steven D. Binder	December 11, 2012	1005	17.65
Diane, the ex-wife of Gibbs and Fornell, returns in the middle of an NCIS investigation.
220	10	"You Better Watch Out"	Tony Wharmby	George Schenck & Frank Cardea	December 18, 2012	1006	19.59
The NCIS team investigates the murder of a man found dead at Patuxent River Station by his wife. After discovering the man had a $100 bill that has not been put in circulation yet, they team up with the Secret Service to find the rest of the money. Meanwhile, Tony's father, Anthony DiNozzo, Sr. comes to stay with Tony for Christmas, causing some friction between the two, and tries to get him into the spirit of Christmas when he notices that Tony does not have a Christmas tree. Tony gets irritated with his father trying to force things by making up for so many missed Christmases in one go, but eventually kicks him out after catching him in bed with a neighbor. Tony and his dad eventually reunite for NCIS' annual tradition of watching It's a Wonderful Life.
221	11	"Shabbat Shalom"	Dennis Smith	Christopher J. Waild	January 8, 2013	1007	21.11
222	12	"Shiva"	Arvin Brown	Teleplay by : Scott Williams; Story by : Christopher J. Waild & Gary Glasberg	January 15, 2013	1008	22.86
A man dressed in a petty officer's uniform is found dead in a lake while Ziva's father Eli is in Washington on a risky mission to bring peace to the Middle East. MCRT search for answers to the killing of Eli David and Jackie Vance by a rogue Mossad operative.
223	13	"Hit and Run"	Dennis Smith	Teleplay by : Gina Lucita Monreal; Story by : Gary Glasberg & Gina Lucita Monreal	January 29, 2013	1009	22.07
The team investigates a car crash where a Marine and a woman are found dead, which makes Abby remembers her "first case".
224	14	"Canary"	Terrence O'Hara	Christopher J. Waild	February 5, 2013	1010	21.79
When NCIS capture one of the nation's most-wanted cyberterrorists, they find he is involved in a plot on a much greater scale than they had anticipated.
225	15	"Hereafter"	Tony Wharmby	Nicole Mirante-Matthews	February 19, 2013	1011	21.08
A Marine is found dead at a navy base, and the investigation leads Gibbs and his team to an illegal fight club. Vance discovers his late wife had a secret safety deposit box.
226	16	"Detour"	Mario Van Peebles	Steven D. Binder	February 26, 2013	1012	20.69
The team launches a search and rescue operation when Ducky and Palmer are kidnapped on the way back to NCIS headquarters.
227	17	"Prime Suspect"	James Whitmore Jr.	George Schenck & Frank Cardea	March 5, 2013	1013	20.81
Gibbs tries to help clear his barber's son's name after the barber suspects his son may be a murderer. Meanwhile, Tony takes Probationary Agent Ned Dorneget on his first undercover assignment.
228	18	"Seek"	Michael Weatherly	Scott Williams	March 19, 2013	1014	19.79
A widowed Marine wife, whose husband was seemingly killed by a Taliban sniper, asks for Gibbs' help to find out the truth. Meanwhile, Vance conducts interviews for a nanny.
229	19	"Squall"	Thomas J. Wright	Bill Nuss	March 26, 2013	1015	18.62
The team investigates the death of a navy medical officer aboard a ship that went through a storm. The prime suspect turns out to be a four-star admiral, who is also McGee's estranged father.
230	20	"Chasing Ghosts"	Arvin Brown	Nicole Mirante-Matthews	April 9, 2013	1016	17.22
While the team takes a missing persons case, Tony is disturbed by Ziva's way of coping with her father's death (after events in "Shiva").
231	21	"Berlin"	Terrence O'Hara	Scott Williams & Gina Lucita Monreal	April 23, 2013	1017	17.33
Part 1 of 6 : Tony puts Ziva before his duties as an agent as she pursues Ilan Bodnar to Germany. However, upon returning to the U.S. Tony and Ziva are left injured in a car accident.
232	22	"Revenge"	James Whitmore Jr.	George Schenck & Frank Cardea	April 30, 2013	1018	18.29
Part 2 of 6 : After events in "Berlin," Gibbs defies a direct order from the Department of Defense as the entire NCIS team joins in the search for Bodnar. Ziva, hurt from the car accident, finally has the opportunity to confront Bodnar, and takes revenge for her father's death by killing him.
233	23	"Double Blind"	Dennis Smith	Christopher J. Waild & Steven D. Binder	May 7, 2013	1019	17.56
Part 3 of 6 : NCIS is subject to investigation by Richard Parsons of the Department of Defense, questioning their response to the deaths of Eli David and Jackie Vance (culminating in the death of Bodnar in "Revenge"). Gibbs is accused of concealing evidence and the obstruction of justice.
234	24	"Damned If You Do"	Tony Wharmby	Gary Glasberg	May 14, 2013	1020	18.79
Part 4 of 6 : In the aftermath of Gibbs' arrest (in "Double Blind"), the Department of Defense broadens its investigation into NCIS, placing the future of the entire agency in jeopardy. While the team believe that the investigating agent is looking to capitalize on Gibbs' arrest to advance Parson's career, they soon discover that NCIS' pursuit of Ilan Bodnar was used to cover up the CIA's involvement in the assassination of Arash Kazmi, Director of the Iran's Ministry of Intelligence, VEVAK. Director Vance enlists retired JAGC leader Rear Admiral Albert Jethro "A.J." Chegwidden to represent Gibbs. Instead of letting Gibbs take all the blame for the charges, Tony, Ziva, and McGee take responsibility for what happened and resign. Four months later, Gibbs aims a sniper rifle at FBI Agent Fornell. The season ends on a cliffhanger, fading to black as the sound of a gunshot is heard.

== Production ==
=== Development ===
NCIS was renewed for a tenth season on March 14, 2012. NCIS was renewed for an eleventh season on February 1, 2013.

=== Casting ===
In June 2012, Entertainment Weekly reported that Brian Dietzen had been promoted to a series regular for this season. John M. Jackson will reprise his role as A.J. Chegwidden in the season finale of NCIS.

== Broadcast ==
Season ten of NCIS premiered on September 25, 2012 on CBS.

== Reception ==
On January 15, 2013, the episode "Shiva" delivered the biggest audience ever so far for an NCIS episode. 22.86 million people watched the episode, which surpassed the season eight episode "Freedom" by 10,000 viewers.

Season ten of NCIS also got to deliver its first place ratings achievement for the 2012–13 United States network television season. NCIS beat out NBC's Sunday Night Football to become the overall most watched program nationally.

=== Ratings ===
Viewership and ratings per episode of NCIS season 10
No.	Title	Air date	Rating/share (18–49)	Viewers (millions)	DVR (18–49)	DVR viewers (millions)	Total (18–49)	Total viewers (millions)
1	"Extreme Prejudice"	September 25, 2012	4.1/12	20.48	1.2	3.65	5.3	24.13
2	"Recovery"	October 2, 2012	3.7/11	18.87	1.2	3.69	4.9	22.56
3	"Phoenix"	October 9, 2012	3.4/10	18.51	1.2	3.75	4.6	22.26
4	"Lost at Sea"	October 23, 2012	3.2/9	17.78	1.2	3.53	4.4	21.31
5	"The Namesake"	October 30, 2012	3.4/9	18.83	0.9	3.06	4.3	21.89
6	"Shell Shock (Part I)"	November 13, 2012	3.1/9	17.05	—N/a	3.25	—N/a	20.30
7	"Shell Shock (Part II)"	November 20, 2012	3.0/9	16.47	1.0	3.30	4.0	19.77
8	"Gone"	November 27, 2012	3.6/10	19.76	0.9	3.13	4.5	22.89
9	"Devil's Trifecta"	December 11, 2012	2.8/8	17.65	1.2	3.55	4.0	21.20
10	"You Better Watch Out"	December 18, 2012	3.3/10	19.59	1.0	3.07	4.3	22.66
11	"Shabbat Shalom"	January 8, 2013	3.5/10	21.11	1.2	3.79	4.7	24.90
12	"Shiva"	January 15, 2013	3.9/11	22.86	1.0	3.22	4.9	26.08
13	"Hit and Run"	January 29, 2013	3.8/10	22.07	1.0	3.48	4.8	25.55
14	"Canary"	February 5, 2013	3.7/11	21.79	1.0	3.28	4.7	25.07
15	"Hereafter"	February 19, 2013	3.5/10	21.08	1.1	3.24	4.6	24.32
16	"Detour"	February 26, 2013	3.4/10	20.69	1.2	3.21	4.6	23.90
17	"Prime Suspect"	March 5, 2013	3.4/10	20.81	1.1	3.36	4.5	24.17
18	"Seek"	March 19, 2013	3.2/10	19.79	1.2	3.68	4.4	23.47
19	"Squall"	March 26, 2013	3.2/9	18.62	1.0	3.46	4.2	22.08
20	"Chasing Ghosts"	April 9, 2013	2.7/8	17.22	1.1	3.52	3.8	20.74
21	"Berlin"	April 23, 2013	2.8/8	17.33	1.1	3.80	3.9	21.13
22	"Revenge"	April 30, 2013	3.1/10	18.29	0.9	3.40	4.0	21.69
23	"Double Blind"	May 7, 2013	3.1/10	17.56	1.0	3.29	4.1	20.85
24	"Damned If You Do"	May 14, 2013	3.4/10	18.79	1.1	3.44	4.5	22.23

== DVD special features ==
- Mr. Carroll Goes to Washington: An Interview with NCIS Director Mark D. Clookie - NCIS actor Rocky Carroll who plays Director Leon Vance on "NCIS" travels to Washington D.C. to interview Mark D. Clookie, the Director of the real-life NCIS agency.
- A Death in the Family - A behind-the-scenes glimpse at the Season 10 episodes, "Shabbat Shalom" and "Shiva".
- DiNozzo's Digs - A glimpse at the apartment of NCIS Special Agent Anthony DiNozzo.
- You Wear It Well - A look at the various costumes that the main NCIS cast use.
- 10 Items or Less: 10 Random Looks at NCIS - A look at ten items associated with NCIS.
- X Marks The Spot: A Look at Season X - The NCIS cast and crew reflect on NCIS Season 10.
- 10 Years Aft - The NCIS cast and crew reflect on NCIS being on air for ten years.
- Inside NCIS - Vance's Office: Highly Decorated- How the Office of NCIS Director Leon Vance was created, Autopsy- Bodies of Work- a behind-the scenes insight into Autopsy/the NCIS morgue, Interrogation- If These Walks Could Talk- A glimpse at the Interrogation and Observation Rooms used on the NCIS set, MTAC- Telecommunication- A behind-the-scenes glimpse of MTAC, The Back Lot- Location, Location, Location- An insight into the back lot that is regularly used for various locations that make up the backgrounds seen in episodes of NCIS, The Ship: Set Afloat- A behind-the-scenes look at a ship set especially built for episodes of NCIS, The Squad Room- Centre of Attention- An insight into the NCIS Squadroom, Abby's Lab- Music and Mayhem- A behind-the-scenes glimpse at the lab of NCIS Forensic Scientist Abigail Sciuto.
- Cast and Crew Commentaries on Selected Episodes (Region 1 and 2): Commentary on "Extreme Prejudice" with Gary Glasberg and Tony Wharmby, "Seek" with Michael Weatherly and Scott Williams, "Hit and Run" with Pauley Perrette and Gina Monreal, "Detour" with David McCallum and Brian Dietzen.
- Deleted Scenes (Region 1 and 2).
