= Hereafter (NCIS) =

- NCIS episode
- Episode no.: Season 10; Episode 15
- Directed by: Tony Wharmby
- Written by: Nicole Mirante-Matthews
- Original air date: February 19, 2013

Guest appearances
- Greg Germann as NCIS Deputy Director Jerome Craig; Jeff Denton as Marine C.O. Captain Jonah Ellis; Joseph Fuhr as Marine Private First Class David Holland; Peter "Navy" Tuiasosopo as Charles "Chucky Bang" Kang; Reiley McClendon as Marine Private Brad Sykes; Kelly E. Smith as Emily Miller; Frantz Turner as Abe Mathison; Pat Asanti as Ruben Williams; Kiara Muhammad as Kayla Vance; Akinsola Aribo as Jared Vance

Episode chronology
← Previous "Canary"	Next → "Detour"
- NCIS season 10

"Hereafter" is the fifteenth episode of the tenth season of the American police procedural drama NCIS, and the 225th episode overall. It originally aired on CBS in the United States on February 19, 2013. The episode is written by Nicole Mirante-Matthews and directed by Tony Wharmby, and was seen by 21.08 million viewers.

In the episode, a marine is found dead at a Navy Base. Soon it's discovered he was involved on an illegal fight club.

== Plot ==
The team is called to investigate the death of a Marine private during training and discovers he had suffered a number of wounds from repeated beatings and stabbings. They initially believe the injuries were received due to his participation in an underground fighting ring, but he had not been in a fight in months. The death of another Marine private who shows similar wounds leads the team to the privates' commanding officer. They discover that the CO's brother was tortured and killed in Iraq, and he was trying to "toughen" up his men in preparation for what they might face in battle.

Meanwhile Director Vance, still on an administrative leave of absence following the murder of his wife Jackie, discovers that she had secretly set up her own bank account and hired a lawyer to draft a Separation of Property letter. Worried about the implications, Vance returns to NCIS, assisting in the case on an investigatory level, rather than immediately resuming his role as director. Vance consults Gibbs, who tells him that Jackie was most likely afraid that Vance would die in the line of duty, and prepared accordingly, since Shannon did the same thing when he was in the Marine Corps. Vance is still unsure of what to do with his life without Jackie, though Gibbs reminds him that he still has his two children to take care of, giving him a purpose.

== Production ==
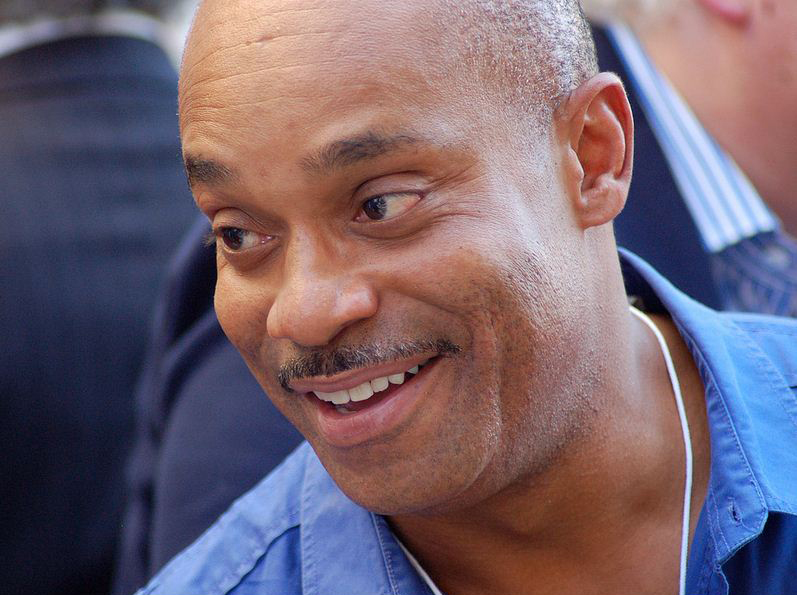
The episode focused on Rocky Carroll's character Leon Vance.

"Hereafter" was written by Nicole Mirante-Matthews and directed by Tony Wharmby. The tenth season's theme "Fallen Heroes" has hit both Ziva and Vance hard. According to Mirante-Matthews, in this episode Leon Vance's process to "come back stronger than before" begins. Rocky Carroll, who portrays Leon Vance, told TV Guide that "[Vance] thought he knew everything about his wife and then finds out that she was basically keeping an aspect of herself from her husband". The "recovery and rebirth" of the character is connected to the same experience Gibbs had with his wife Shannon, making Gibbs "pull [Vance] back from [the] brink" after questioning his wife's intentions. The death of Jackie is "going to give [Vance] a much deeper understanding about Gibbs and what Gibbs has experienced and how he has lived his life since losing his family", Carroll continued.

== Reception ==
"Hereafter" was seen by 21.08 million live viewers following its broadcast on February 19, 2013, with a 3.5/10 share among adults aged 18 to 49. A rating point represents one percent of the total number of television sets in American households, and a share means the percentage of television sets in use tuned to the program. In total viewers, "Hereafter" easily won NCIS and CBS the night. The spin-off NCIS: Los Angeles drew second and was seen by 16.27 million viewers. Compared to the last episode "Canary", "Hereafter" was down in both viewers and adults 18–49.

Douglas Wolfe from TV Fanatic gave the episode 4.5 (out of 5) and stated that "I liked the fact that Ziva finally had a brief heart to heart with Vance about the death of his wife. The beautiful/tender tension between them was portrayed so well by Cote de Pablo and Rocky Carroll. There was some great acting there. The compelling conclusion tied up Vance's story nicely, with Gibbs making him realize that Jackie was merely preparing her kids and herself for a time when Vance wouldn't be around. The key point involved the fact that she started preparing around the time the NCIS building was bombed."
