= Radioflash (film) =

- Directed by: Ben McPherson
- Written by: Ben McPherson; Matt Redhawk
- Produced by: Rocco DeVilliers; Ben McPherson; Brad Skaar; Clay Vandiver
- Starring: Brighton Sharbino; Dominic Monaghan; Will Patton; Fionnula Flanagan; Miles Anderson
- Cinematography: Austin F. Schmidt
- Music by: Ramin Kousha
- Production company: American Dream Labs
- Distributed by: IFC Midnight
- Release date: November 15, 2019
- Running time: 102 minutes
- Country: United States
- Language: English

Radioflash is a 2019 American thriller drama film directed by Ben McPherson, starring Brighton Sharbino, Dominic Monaghan, Will Patton, Fionnula Flanagan and Miles Anderson.

== Cast ==
- Brighton Sharbino as Reese
- Dominic Monaghan as Chris
- Will Patton as Frank
- Fionnula Flanagan as Maw
- Miles Anderson as Farmer Glenn
- Michael Filipowich as Bill
- Kyle Collin as Quinn

In addition, YouTuber SypherPK cameos in a livestream Reese watches.

== Release ==
The film was released on November 15, 2019.

== Reception ==
John Defore of The Hollywood Reporter wrote, "If the dangers tilt toward the lurid, though, the film never quite loses sight of its endpoint or gives in to the horrors it threatens. Unsatisfyingly, it instead concludes with a tech-flavored shot that might hint at greater ambitions for what seems like a stand-alone adventure." Dennis Harvey of Variety called the film "an offbeat conceptual mixture, albeit one that’s somewhat frustrating and occasionally tedious, if beautifully photographed by Austin Schmidt."

Noel Murray of the Los Angeles Times wrote that "given how visually inventive and unusual the film’s first five minutes are, it’s disappointing that, by its last half hour, it essentially turns into one undistinguished chase scene after another." Jeannette Catsoulis of The New York Times wrote that the film "is only marginally more thrilling than the average wine tasting."
