= Canary (NCIS) =

- NCIS episode
- Episode no.: Season 10; Episode 14
- Directed by: Terrence O'Hara
- Written by: Christopher J. Waild
- Original air date: February 5, 2013

Guest appearances
- Greg Germann as NCIS Deputy Director Jerome Craig; Vik Sahay as Ajay Khan; Ethan Rains as NCIS Systems Administrator Kevin Hussein; Russell Richardson as Army Sergeant Chad Spooner; Stacey Hinnen as Delivery Driver; Geoffrey Wade as Air Force Brigadier General Jack Mandrake; Johnny Kostrey as Air Force Crew Chief

Episode chronology
← Previous "Hit and Run"	Next → "Hereafter"
- NCIS season 10

"Canary" is the fourteenth episode of the tenth season of the American police procedural drama NCIS, and the 224th episode overall. It originally aired on CBS in the United States on February 5, 2013. The episode is written by Christopher J. Waild and directed by Terrence O’Hara and was seen by 21.79 million viewers.

== Plot ==
The team captures a master hacker who happens to be second on the most wanted cyberterrorist list and was also responsible for a cyber attack on MTAC which resulted in the death of an undercover agent. The team is interested in interrogating him for the location of the most wanted cyberterrorist, a hacker who is only identified as "MC". Analyzing the hacker's computer, Ziva and DiNozzo investigate a warehouse and find evidence of a bomb containing the Ebola virus having been built. In order to get the hacker to talk, Ziva and DiNozzo fly him to Guantanamo Bay detention camp in an effort to intimidate him by placing him with terrorists he had previously betrayed. However, once they arrive, the prison's security is compromised, leading to a mass breakout. The prisoners demand Ziva and DiNozzo hand over the hacker in return for their lives. In order to save himself, the hacker reveals how they can find MC. It is then revealed that the entire breakout was a ploy; NCIS only tricked the hacker into thinking they were in Guantanamo Bay when they in fact had never left the United States. Meanwhile, Gibbs and McGee manage to trace the Ebola bomb and safely defuse it. Even though the plan was foiled and they have a way of tracking MC, Deputy Director Craig points out NCIS still have to arrest him.

== Production ==
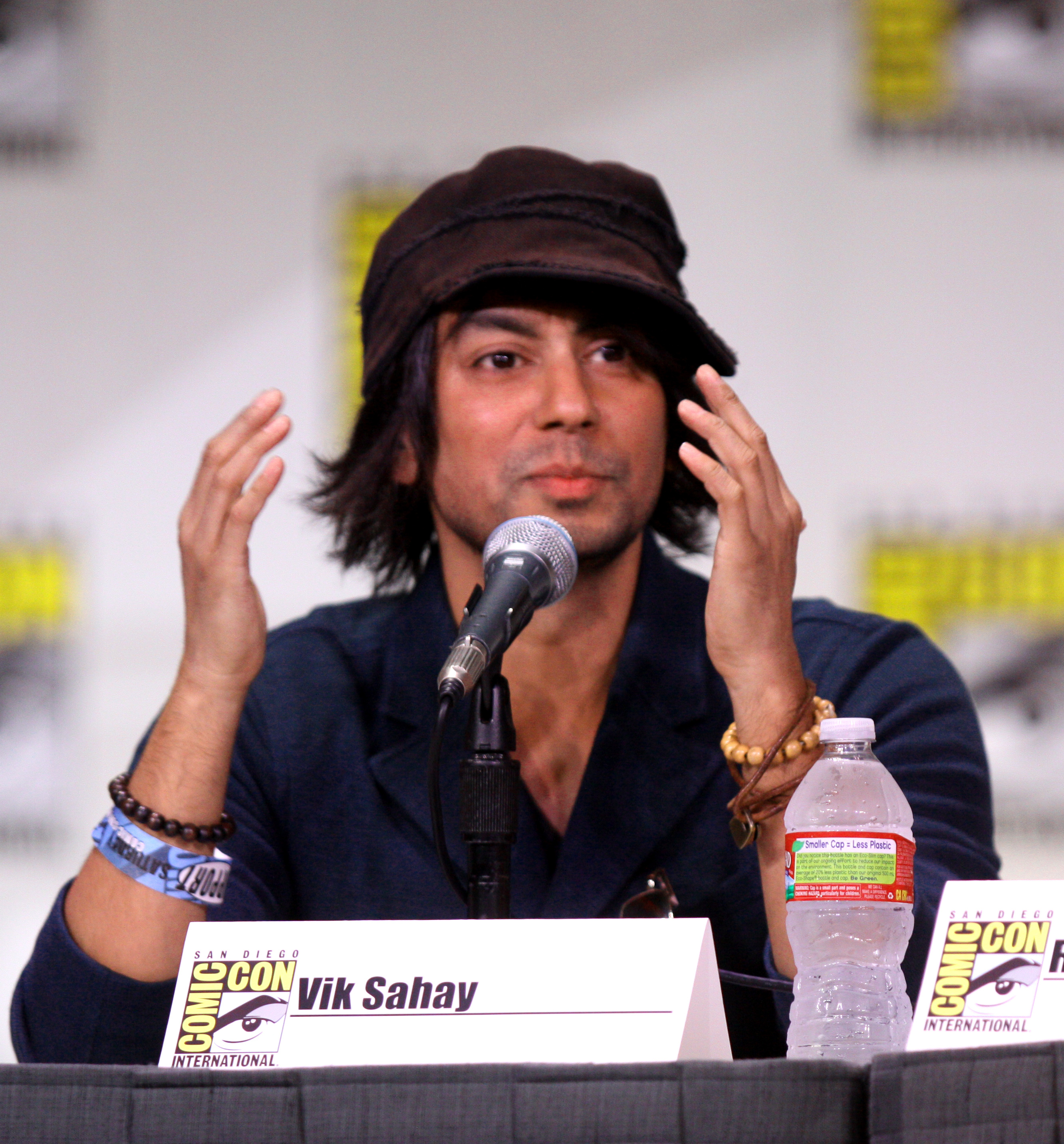
Vik Sahay guest starred as the hacker Ajay Khan.

"Canary" is written by Christopher J. Waild and directed by Terrence O’Hara. Waild describes the episode as both "team-centric" and "energy-driven". The premise for the episode was the "threat of 'Gitmo' to break suspects". Unlike before, Waild wanted to "follow through and send a suspect to Camp Delta". Ajay Khan eventually believed the "set-up", but Waild's "hope" for the episode was to "try to keep viewers guessing as to where exactly reality ended and the puppet show began".

Under post-production of the episode, a Star Trek II: The Wrath of Khan "reference/joke" was cut due to time limit.

== Gibbs' rules ==
Rule No. 39 was mentioned in the episode: "No such thing [as a coincidence]".

== Reception ==
"Canary" was seen by 21.79 million live viewers following its broadcast on February 5, 2013, with a 3.7/11 share among adults aged 18 to 49. A rating point represents one percent of the total number of television sets in American households, and a share means the percentage of television sets in use tuned to the program. In total viewers, "Canary" easily won NCIS and CBS the night. The spin-off NCIS: Los Angeles drew second and was seen by 16.67 million viewers. Compared to the last episode "Hit and Run", "Canary" was down in both viewers and adults 18–49.

Douglas Wolfe from TV Fanatic gave the episode 4.5 (out of 5) and stated that "The most compelling aspect of this episode was the character of Khan. Often we are treated to fiends who are just a little less intelligent than the NCIS team. Not this time, though. Khan was written to be a canny guy who not only knew his rights, but was able to guess at many of the tricks the team might throw at him to get him to talk. [He] was probably one of the most irritating know-it-all smarmy characters to appear on the show, so it was cathartic to watch McGee plow through all of his logic in order to arrive at the conclusion that indeed Khan did know MC's IP address."
