= Shiva (NCIS) =

- NCIS episode
- Tony finds Ziva in the synagogue
- Episode no.: Season 10; Episode 12
- Directed by: Arvin Brown
- Written by: Christopher J. Waild, Gary Glasberg and Scott Williams
- Original air date: January 15, 2013

Guest appearances
- Matt Craven as SecNav Clayton Jarvis; Oded Fehr as Mossad Deputy Director Ilan Bodnar; Greg Germann as NCIS Deputy Director Jerome Craig; Nasser Faris as Arash Kazmi; Forry Smith as Duane Gustafson; Jack Axelrod as Shmeil Pinkhas; Georgia Hatzis as Gavriela Adel; Akinsola Aribo as Jared Vance; Kiara Muhammad as Kayla Vance; Gabi Coccio as 13-Year Old Ziva David; Ben Morrison as Young Eli David; Kim Estes as Minister; Ryan Locke as Roland Ames; Zuanna Sherman as Bodyguard

Episode chronology
← Previous "Shabbat Shalom"	Next → "Hit and Run"
- NCIS season 10

"Shiva" is the twelfth episode of the tenth season of the American police procedural drama NCIS, and the 222nd episode overall. It originally aired on CBS in the United States on January 15, 2013. The episode is written by Christopher J. Waild, Gary Glasberg and Scott Williams and directed by Arvin Brown, and was seen live by 22.86 million viewers.

"Shiva" follows "Shabbat Shalom", which aired the previous week and featured the shooting deaths of Mossad Director Eli David, the father of Ziva David, and Jackie Vance, the wife of NCIS Director Leon Vance. In the episode, Ziva and Vance must cope with the deaths of both Eli and Jackie as the rest of the team investigates the tragedy. While searching for answers, the characters also deal with the looming threat of war between Israel and Iran.

"Shiva", together with "Shabbat Shalom", sets in motion the primary long-term storyline in the second half of the tenth season. The arc is additionally significant in terms of character development — Director Vance, then regarded as the character with the most stable home life, is left a widower with two children while Ziva loses her last remaining family member, her mother and siblings having all been killed prior. "Shiva" was received with overwhelmingly positive reviews and became the most watched episode of the series, surpassing season 8's "Freedom", the previous series high in viewers.

== Etymology ==
Shiva (שבעה), which literally means "seven" in Hebrew, is the week-long mourning period in Judaism for a "first-degree" relative: parent, sibling, spouse or child. The ritual is called sitting Shiva and is begun immediately following the funeral of the deceased relative. In this case, it refers to Ziva's mourning the death of her father.

== Plot ==
The episode opens depicting a young Ziva (Gabi Coccio) praying the Shabbat blessing over candles, with her father (Ben Morrison) standing next to her. Various other family members, now deceased, are shown surrounding her, including her mother, older brother Ari, and younger sister Tali. The memory fades and an adult Ziva appears in a synagogue questioning God, "Why should I not be angry, with all that has been taken?" She further pleads for a sign that she should not lose hope. Tony then enters the room and attempts to offer support, though she declines any expressions of sympathy, saying that she instead needs "revenge".

SECNAV Jarvis, angered that he was not informed of Eli David's presence in the United States, orders Gibbs that the murder investigation of David and Director Vance's wife, Jackie, be kept quiet to avoid an outcry while the identity of the perpetrator is still unknown. Meanwhile, Ducky determines that the shooter was a dying Swedish mercenary who was hired to perform the killings.

As Ziva and Vance struggle to cope with their losses, both attempt to participate in the investigation despite being prohibited due to their relationships with the deceased. NCIS Deputy Director Jerome Craig (Greg Germann) is brought in to temporarily replace Vance, and Eli's burial is delayed due to the investigation, causing Ziva further pain as Jewish law mandates that a person be buried within twenty-four hours.

The team first suspects Arash Kazmi (Nasser Faris), the Iranian Eli had met with days earlier to discuss the possibility of peace between their countries, though Kazmi protests his innocence and offers VEVAK files (intel) to support his claims. McGee contacts Gavriela Adel (Georgia Hatzis), a Mossad agent stationed in Jerusalem, who suggests Duane Gustafson (Forry Smith), an American millionaire who provides funding to an anti-Mossad group, as a potential suspect. Gustafson, however, insists that his association with anti-Israel organizations is "strictly business".

Because Gibbs is concerned that Ziva will be the next target, Tony takes her to his apartment as a precaution. Still trying to console her, he brings her longtime Israeli friend Shmeil (Jack Axelrod) to stay with them and lets her sleep in his bed. Later, he attempts to soothe her after a nightmare, but Ziva again refuses comfort and insists that she is "fine".

Mossad Deputy Director Ilan Bodnar (Oded Fehr), described by Ziva as Eli's protégé, arrives at NCIS demanding answers and exasperated that Kazmi has not yet been charged. Ziva, in turn, is infuriated that the team is sharing information with Ilan, a man who considered himself to be like a son to Eli, that was withheld from her, his blood daughter. Tony responds, "Now you are the daughter of a dead man — let yourself act like one."

The NCIS team locates a bank account under the name of "Virtue" that allows them to track the man who hired the hitman while Ziva speaks to Ilan over video chat. Ziva agrees to Ilan's request to meet her at the apartment before Gibbs calls her and asks her about the significance of "Virtue". She realizes that the Hebrew word for "virtue" is Ilan's middle name, prompting them to come to the conclusion that he must have been behind the killings. Gibbs and Tony rush to the apartment before Bodnar reaches it, presumably to kill Ziva, but he never shows.

Shortly afterwards, Kazmi's vehicle is bombed, killing Kazmi and Bodnar disappears.

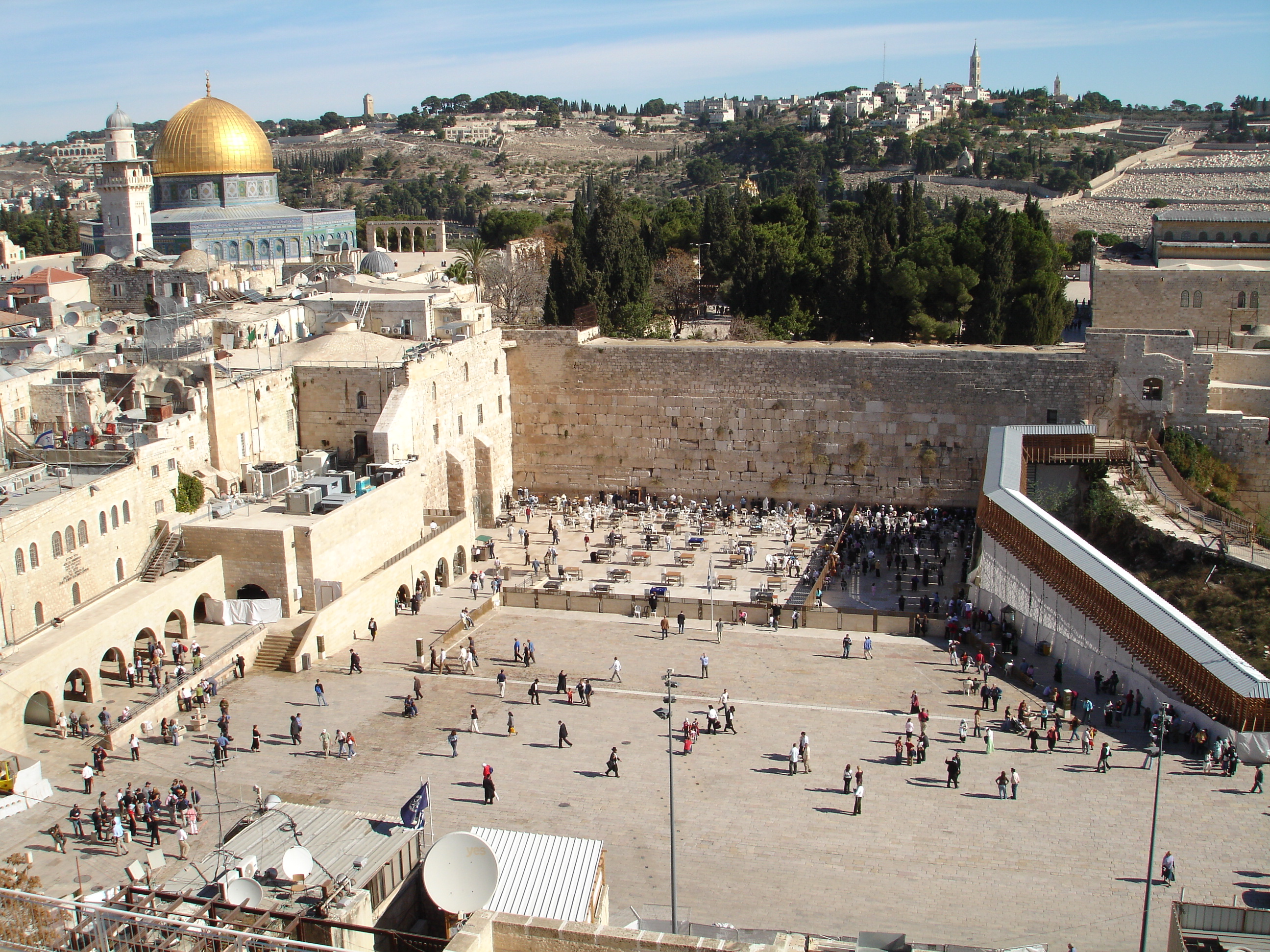
The Western Wall in Jerusalem, where Ziva was shown praying in the final scenes of the episode.

Eli's body is released for burial that evening, and Tony goes to the airport to see Ziva before she leaves for Israel. He urges her not to seek revenge on her own, and, though she does not renounce her desire to do so, she assures him that for now, she is only attending a funeral. They embrace, with Ziva finally accepting comfort for her loss, and Tony reminds her in Hebrew, "Aht lo levad" ("You are not alone"). The episode ends with Jackie's funeral and Ziva mourning Eli in Israel, visiting the Western Wall, and planting an olive tree as Patty Griffin's "You Are Not Alone" plays in the background.

== Production ==
=== Writing ===
"Shiva" was written by Christopher J. Waild, Gary Glasberg and Scott Williams and directed by Arvin Brown. As the episode focused on the aftermath of Eli and Jackie's deaths, the writers discussed which response Ziva and Vance would pursue. "The natural response to the murders of Eli David and Jackie Vance would be all about revenge", but the writers "realized that it might be better for [the] characters to take a breath". Even though Ilan Bodnar wasn't caught in the episode, "Ziva and Vance will get to pursue justice soon enough".

About the deaths of Eli and Jackie, executive producer Gary Glasberg told TVLine "this is something that we’ve been talking about for a long time". The death of Jackie was chosen because Glasberg "wanted to do something that would open up [Vance's] world a bit". The same goes for the death of Eli, "It opened a lot of doors" for the writers. He also stated that Jackie's death illustrated the impact of collateral damage, saying, "One of the things I wanted to touch upon was when people do what our team does for a living as NCIS agents, it is easy to forget that there are civilian casualties that go along with it."

On the long-term repercussions, Glasberg added that "[Vance] is clearly going to need some time to be there for his family. It's just a matter of balancing work with personal life...There's a real sort of clue trail that unfolds specific to Ziva and her world as to who's responsible. Ziva certainly has to deal with the loss and the tumultuous familial background that she has...Even with the complexity of what existed between Ziva and Eli, at the end of the day, he was her father and she loved him. There are good memories that go with the bad...It absolutely weighs on her. When anyone loses someone, you think about what they meant to you and what part of them you continue to carry. I think those are questions she will continue to seek and look for answers to as she moves forward."

It was also pointed out that the shootings, and the revelation that the perpetrator was someone Ziva had known since childhood, would affect the relationships of certain characters: "It certainly raises the point of who [Ziva] can trust and who she holds close. She has her NCIS family and it impacts her relationship with Gibbs [Mark Harmon] and with Tony [Michael Weatherly]. Tony really stepped up in this last episode and that will continue to happen. The complexity and fun of the Ziva/Tony relationship will continue."

=== Casting ===
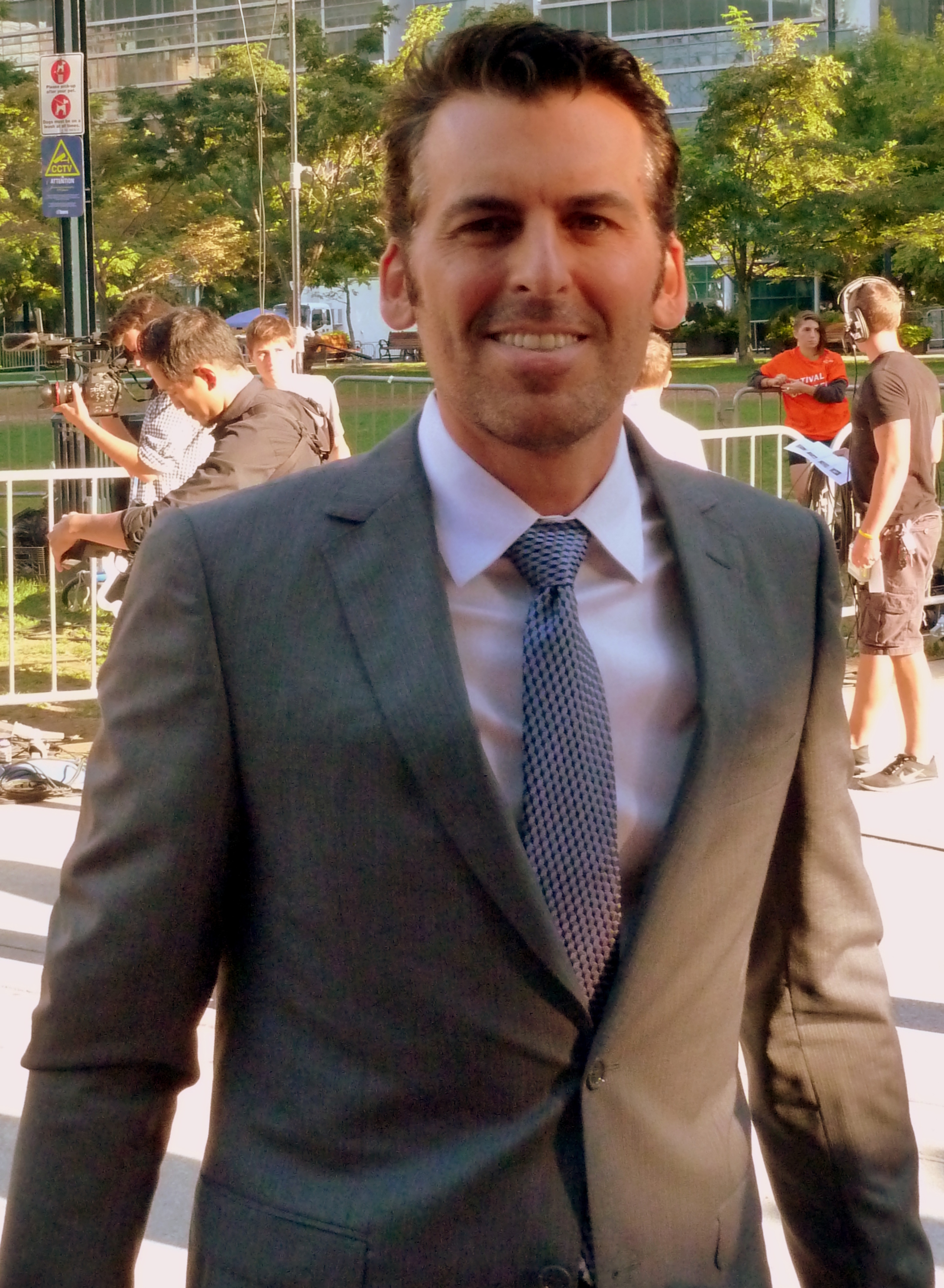
Israeli actor Oded Fehr, who portrayed Mossad Deputy Director Ilan Bodnar.

Several recurring characters reappeared in the episode. Matt Craven and Nasser Faris reprised their roles as Clayton Jarvis and Arash Kazmi respectively. Jack Axelrod, first seen in the Season 10 episode "Gone", portrayed Shmeil Pinkhas. Akinsola Aribo and Kiara Muhammad reprised their roles as Director Vance's children.

On November 16, 2012, TV Line announced the casting of Greg Germann as Director Vance's "next in charge", Deputy Director Jerome Craig. Germann could play a "potentially recurring role". Glasberg clarified, "I don’t want people to think Greg coming in is replacing Vance in any way. That is not the case. This is true in the real world of NCIS as well. This is a very close-knit organization and people really do have their backs. I wanted to touch on that as well."

On November 29, 2012, three other roles were confirmed for the episode: "a Mossad associate director" (Oded Fehr); "an American businessman whose oil fortune burdens him with ties to the Middle East" (Forry Smith); and "Gavriela, a sexy and smart Israeli informant for the CIA, played by Georgia Hatzis". Cote de Pablo (who portrays Ziva) added that Gavriela "may actually come back, depending on the storyline and how it unfolds".

In January 2013, Telegram & Gazette reported, "Gabi Coccio, 13, formerly of Holden, will appear at 8 p.m. Tuesday night on the CBS crime drama NCIS, which stars Mark Harmon." The article added that, according to Coccio's father, "Gabi has done some other things but this is her first national appearance and first on a show like this." Another report stated that she would depict a 13-year-old Ziva for a flashback in the opening scene. Ben Morrison, likewise, acted alongside her as a younger version of Eli.

In November 2012, it was reported, "NCIS is looking for someone to play a minister to perform at a...wait for it...funeral service." Kim Estes was later cast to perform Jackie Vance's funeral.

== Reception ==
=== Ratings ===
"Shiva" was seen by 22.86 million live viewers in the United States following its broadcast on January 15, 2013, with a 3.9/10 share among adults aged 18 to 49. A rating point represents one percent of the total number of television sets in American households, and a share means the percentage of television sets in use tuned to the program. In total viewers, "Shiva" easily won NCIS and CBS the night. The spin-off NCIS: Los Angeles drew second and was seen by 17.63 million viewers. Compared to the last episode "Shabbat Shalom", "Shiva" was up in both viewers and adults 18–49.

It was later reported that the "total rose to 25.36 million viewers in L+3, marking the first NCIS broadcast to deliver more than 25 million viewers in Live + DVR viewing."

In Canada, "Shiva" drew 2.45 million viewers, making it the most watched television program of the night. The episode aired in Australia two months later on March 12, 2013, with 0.717 million viewers watching live.

=== Critical response ===
Reviews were primarily positive and critics praised the way the storyline was handled. BuddyTV included "Shiva" in its list of "The 10 Best Ziva Episodes", and Michelle Carlbert from TV Equals wrote that, "I think this episode has now become my favorite Ziva episode...In fact, I think I'm going to call this one of my top favorite episodes ever." She added, "I also have to say that I am very happy that they didn’t catch Ilan in this episode. Oded Fehr was fantastic and him getting away means that we will see him again someday. That is very good news indeed."

Some reviewers commended the character development, in particular of Tony, in the episode. Douglas Wolfe from TV Fanatic gave the episode 5 (out of 5) and stated that "The writers must be applauded: the story flowed exactly as it should have and there was a richness and depth to almost every scene. Gone (for the most part) was Tony the comedian and in his place was Tony the rock, which we saw when he entered the temple where Ziva was praying. He didn't try to manage her, or come up with a solution or a fleeting sentiment...[He] was so tuned into Ziva's torment – he didn't make a wrong move at any time. And every choice he made was dead-on." Bradley Adams of SpoilerTV.com wrote, "In 'Shiva' we saw a new personality in many of the characters. Ziva and Vance's hunger for revenge was very clear throughout this episode. Even more obvious, was the way Tony acted. Unlike the usual joking around Tony, we saw a very serious and caring side in him. He became an even more important character than usual...Tony's send-off for Ziva was brilliant of him. Aht lo leh-vahd, 'You are not alone' in English, showed Ziva how much he cared for her."

Paulette Cohn of Xfinity called the choice to kill off two characters in one episode "bold" and speculated about the long-term impact: "Jackie’s death gives the 10-year-old series a chance to explore new territory and new storylines now that Vance is a widower...It will, of course, also be a very trying time for Ziva. She had a love/hate relationship with her father, but at the end of the day — as is true with a lot of people and their families — she loved him. Her grief is compounded by the fact that Ziva has a very complex family history, including the loss of her sister and having had to kill her half-brother Ari. And now, her father was betrayed — shot to death — by a man who was like an adopted son to him."

Adams called the final minutes of the episode "one of the saddest scenes [he had] ever seen" and said, "Ziva's traditional burial for her father, despite her being alone, was a very melancholy scene, and vastly affected the episode. The same could be said for another grieving family, the Vance family. Vance discovered in this episode what Gibbs felt after his wife and daughter were killed. This scene (Ziva's bit included) almost brought me to tears. The music used could not have been better chosen, and really added that extra bit of sorrow to the scene." Steve Marsi from TV Fanatic called the closing montage set to "Not Alone" by Patti Griffin "moving" and said that the entire episode was "heartbreaking and surprisingly complex".

Other critics questioned the possibility of a hidden political message. Edwin Frankel, Columbus Judaism Examiner, wrote, "I am amazed more often than not by the respect the show creators usually show for Judaism and for Israel as they depict one of the show's key personalities, Ziva David, an NCIS special agent played by Cote de Pablo." Frankel expressed concern for the plot twist making Eli David's killer another Israeli, seeing Bodnar's overall motivation as the root of the issue. Though Bodnar was later established to have acted alone, when the episode first aired it was "unclear if the killing was the act of a deranged individual seeking self promotion, or if it was a matter of Mossad policy, or perhaps worse, the act of the Israeli government".
