= Seek (NCIS) =

- NCIS episode
- Episode no.: Season 10; Episode 18
- Directed by: Michael Weatherly
- Written by: Scott Williams
- Original air date: March 19, 2013

Guest appearances
- Kelli Barrett as Ruby Lemere; Billy Smith as Jim Virgil; Michael Wiseman as Chet Tyber; Graham Beckel as Norman Pittorino; Michael Grant Terry as Marine Sergeant Ted Lemere; Linara Washington as Lara Morgan; Sterling Jones as Marine Captain Dale Martens; Sarah Hagan as Sandy; Aaron Jaeger as Marine Corporal David Ryan; Carole Gutierrez as Woman; Lucy Davenport as Maria; Lee Broda as Afghan Mother; Noble Tabibian as Afghan Boy #1; Miles Mendelsohn as Afghan Boy #2

Episode chronology
← Previous "Prime Suspect"	Next → "Squall"
- NCIS season 10

"Seek" is the 18th episode of the tenth season of the American police procedural drama NCIS, and the 228th episode overall. It originally aired on CBS in the United States on March 19, 2013. The episode is written by Scott Williams and directed by Michael Weatherly, and was seen by 19.79 million viewers.

In the episode, a widowed Marine wife, whose husband was seemingly killed by a Taliban sniper, asks Gibbs' help to find out the truth. Meanwhile, Vance is conducting interviews for a nanny.

== Plot ==
In Afghanistan, EOD specialist Marine Sergeant Theodore "Ted" Lemere is shot and killed by a sniper after leading a trapped child out of a minefield with the help of his bomb sniffing dog, Dex.

Lemere's widow, Ruby, approaches Gibbs, showing him a video message left behind by Lemere indicating that he might have been deliberately targeted. Abby's analysis of the bullet that killed Lemere appears to confirm this after tracing the bullet to an American manufacturer. Gibbs suspects that the lead dog handler of a civilian contractor, Beta Co, might be responsible since he and Lemere had gotten in a fight previously, though they lack evidence to prove it. Ruby then receives a gold medallion in the mail, which is revealed to have been looted from Afghanistan. When a thief attempts to break into the Lemere household to steal the medallion, Dex chases the thief away.

Gibbs and McGee decide to take Dex back to Afghanistan to investigate the crime scene while the rest of the team processes the evidence the thief left behind. DiNozzo and Ziva arrest the thief, who was using his contacts in Beta Co to smuggle looted Afghani artifacts into the US. Lemere stumbled onto the looting racket while he and Dex were clearing abandoned houses and refused the contractor's offer to assist them. Gibbs confronts the Beta Co contractors, pointing out one of them was a former Special Forces marksman. The marksman draws his weapon on Gibbs, but Dex lunges and takes the bullet instead, before the marksman is shot dead by Gibbs. The surviving contractor is arrested for Lemere's murder.

At Lemere's funeral, Gibbs approaches Ruby and tells her that due to the wounds he suffered, Dex has been permanently retired from the Marines, meaning he can stay with Ruby, much to her joy. The episode then ends with a phoof of Dex sitting by Ruby's side as the two study the coffin.

Meanwhile, Director Vance is interviewing potential nannies to take care of his children but keeps rejecting the applicants. He confides in Ziva (whose father died in the same attack that killed Vance's wife) that he's afraid that if he hires a nanny, it will signify that he has moved on from his wife's death. Ziva tells Vance that only he can decide when to move on - let no one else dictate when he should. Inspired, Vance finally decides on which nanny to hire.

== Production ==
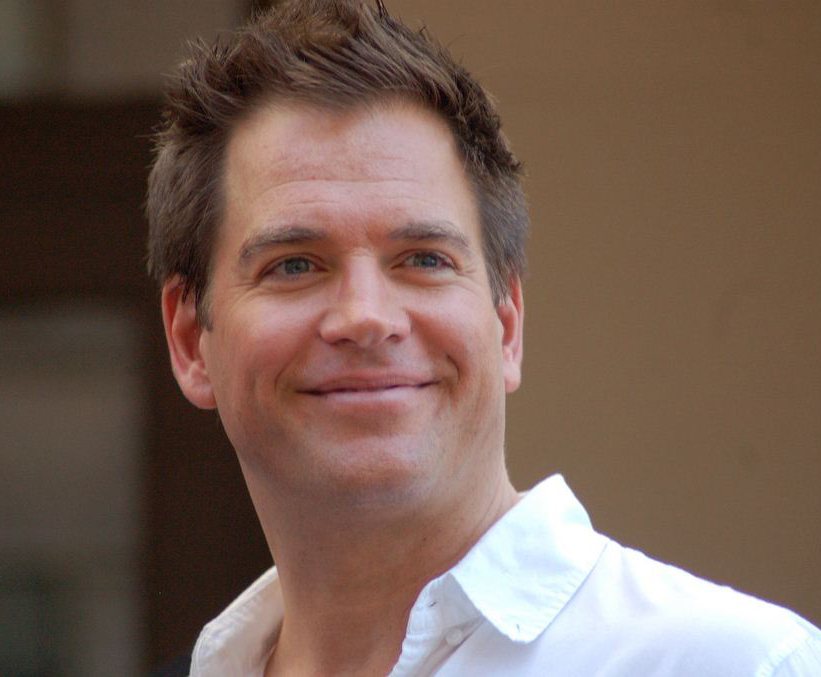
Michael Weatherly (portraying Tony DiNozzo) directed "Seek".

"Seek" is written by Scott Williams and directed by Michael Weatherly. "It all started with a photograph", Williams said about the story behind the episode. "Last year, the touching image of a black lab named Hawkeye laying faithfully beside the flag-draped casket of his late master, Navy SEAL hero Jon Tumilson, swept the internet and made headlines most everywhere. It served as yet another stark reminder of the sacrifices made by our military men and women and their families (pets included)", Williams continued.

According to Williams, the episode is "dedicated to military working dogs and their brave handlers everywhere".

This is the second episode of NCIS directed by series star Michael Weatherly, the first being "One Last Score" back in 2011.

== Reception ==
"Seek" was seen by 19.79 million live viewers following its broadcast on March 19, 2013, with a 3.2/10 share among adults aged 18 to 49. A rating point represents one percent of the total number of television sets in American households, and a share means the percentage of television sets in use tuned to the program. In total viewers, "Seek" easily won NCIS and CBS the night. The spin-off NCIS: Los Angeles drew second and was seen by 16.84 million viewers. Compared to the last episode "Prime Suspect", "Seek" was down in both viewers and adults 18–49.

Douglas Wolfe from TV Fanatic gave the episode 4.5/5 and stated that "You can never go wrong putting a dog into the star seat in any TV episode. And Dexter filled the role especially well in "Seek," a NCIS' story about a K9 expert who was killed by a sniper after saving a child from a Taliban mine field in Afghanistan. [...] The writing for this episode (kudos to Scott Williams) was clever. Even the name of the episode - "Seek" - served to bring the themes together in a collage of purpose: Vance was seeking a nanny; Ziva was seeking Bodnar; the NCIS team was seeking Ted's killer; and Dex... well, Dex's purpose was to seek out mines and IEDs."
