= Kiara Muhammad =

American actress (born 1998)

- Born: December 16, 1998 (age 27); Boston, Massachusetts, U.S.
- Occupation: Actress
- Years active: 2003–present

Kiara Muhammad (born December 16, 1998) is an American actress known for playing the role of Dottie a.k.a. Doc in the TV show Doc McStuffins for its first 2 seasons.

== Life and career ==
Muhammad was born on December 16, 1998, in Boston, Massachusetts. At a young age, she started her career by being in photoshoots for Reebok.

Muhammad voiced the titular character in Doc McStuffins during the first two seasons of the series. In 2012, the show was the most popular preschool TV series for girls aged 3–5.

== Filmography ==
=== Film ===
| Year | Film | Role | Notes |
|---|---|---|---|
| 2007 | Life Support | Student | Uncredited |
| 2009 | Steps | Jane | Short film |
| 2010 | Den Brother | Ursula | |
| 2010 | I Will Follow | Ronda, Fran's Daughter | |
| 2011 | Billion Dollar Freshmen | Keshia | |
| 2011 | David Goldberg | Paula | Short film |
| 2012 | Me Again | Darla | |

=== Television ===
| Year | Title | Role | Notes |
|---|---|---|---|
| 2010 | Hannah Montana | Krystal | Episode: "Sweet Home Hannah Montana" |
| 2010 | Mike & Molly | Kanessa Jones | 3 episodes |
| 2010 | Conan | Knockoff Xmas Caroler | Episode dated: December 2010 |
| 2011 | Conan | Little Girl | 1 episode |
| 2011 | Curb Your Enthusiasm | Girl Scout #1 | Episode: "The Divorce" |
| 2012–2015 | Doc McStuffins | Doc McStuffins (voice) | Main role (seasons 1–2) |
| 2012 | NCIS | Kayla Vance | Episodes: "The Good Son" "Shiva" "Hereafter" "Homesick" |
| 2012 | Hart of Dixie | Young Student | Episode: "Aliens & Aliases" |
| 2015–2016 | Sofia the First | Princess Kari (voice) | Recurring role |
| 2021 | S.W.A.T | Monica | Episode: "Whistleblower" |
| 2021 | Dave | Doja's Assistant | Episode: "Somebody Date Me" |
| 2022 | Winning Time: The Rise of the Lakers Dynasty | Evelyn Johnson | 2 episodes |
| 2023 | All American: Homecoming | Patrice | Episode: "I Can Tell" |
| 2024 | 9-1-1 | Kianna Harris | Episode: "Capsized" |
