= Brighton Sharbino =

American actress (born 2002)

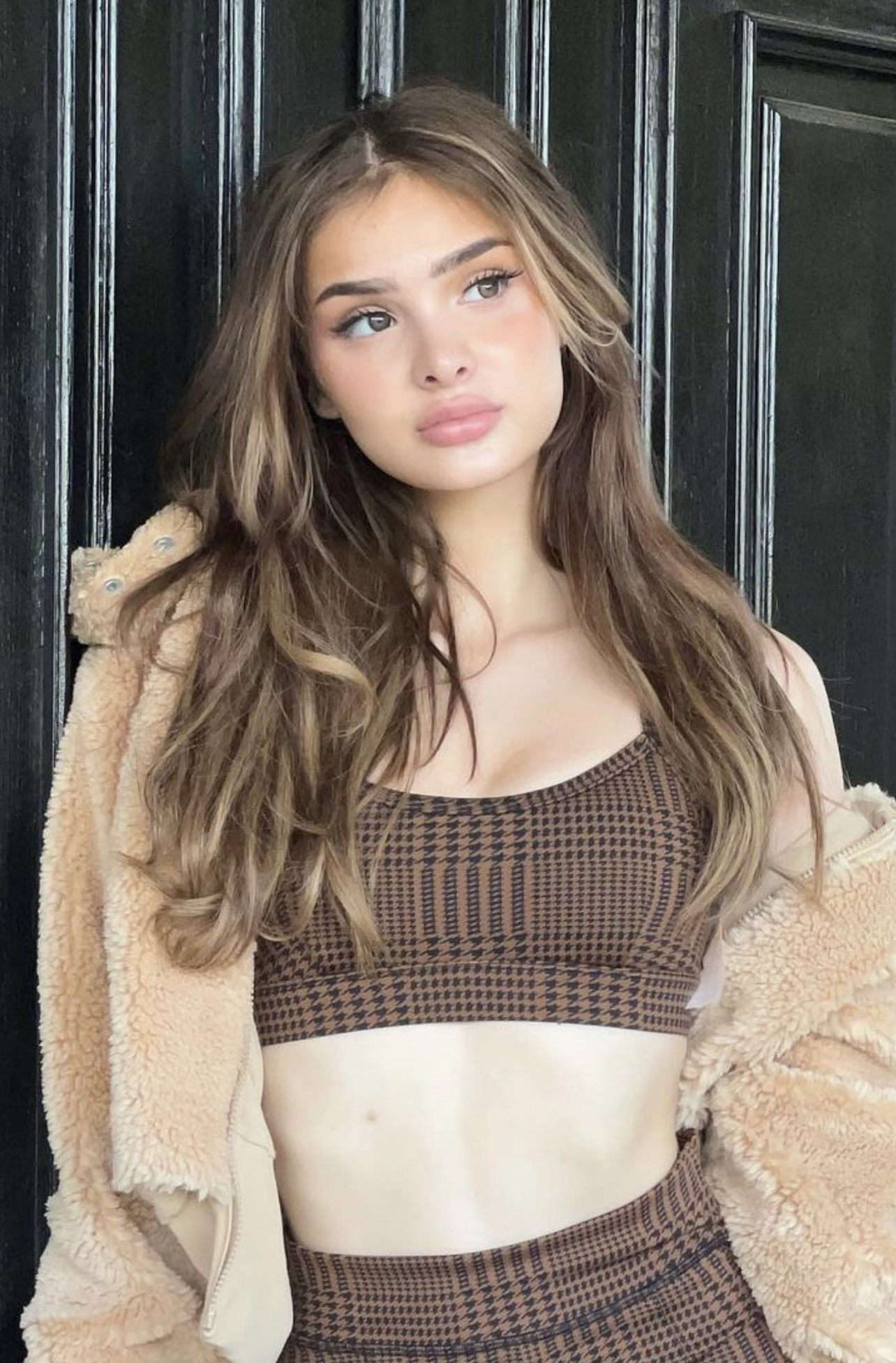
- Sharbino in 2023
- Born: August 19, 2002 (age 24); Flower Mound Texas, USA
- Occupation: Actress
- Years active: 2008–2023
- Relatives: Saxon Sharbino (sister)

Brighton Sharbino (born August 19, 2002) is an American actress. She is best known for her role as Lizzie Samuels on the AMC television series The Walking Dead.

== Early life ==
Sharbino's siblings Saxon and Sawyer Sharbino also act, and the family moved to Los Angeles when Brighton was nine. She switched to online school to make time for her acting career.

== Career ==
Sharbino began her career singing on Barney & Friends on PBS. She had other early guest television appearances on series such as Hannah Montana, Prime Suspect, The New Normal and True Detective.

In 2013, Sharbino landed her first major recurring role as Lizzie Samuels in the fourth and fifth seasons of The Walking Dead. She appeared in the film Cheap Thrills and played Young Abby Sciuto in the "Hit and Run" episode of NCIS.

She played the young version of Ingrid in the episode "The Snow Queen" in season 4 of Once Upon a Time. Regarding the role, she stated "It was very different from shooting The Walking Dead and I loved it ‘cause I got to be a princess. In The Walking Dead they would put dirt on me. OUAT put extensions on me, were fixing my hair, and let me wear a princess dress, it was really fun to do. It was a dream." Sharbino played Abby Beam in the 2016 faith based film Miracles From Heaven, alongside Queen Latifah and Jennifer Garner. The movie was shot in Atlanta in the summer of 2015 and Sharbino had her 13th birthday on set.

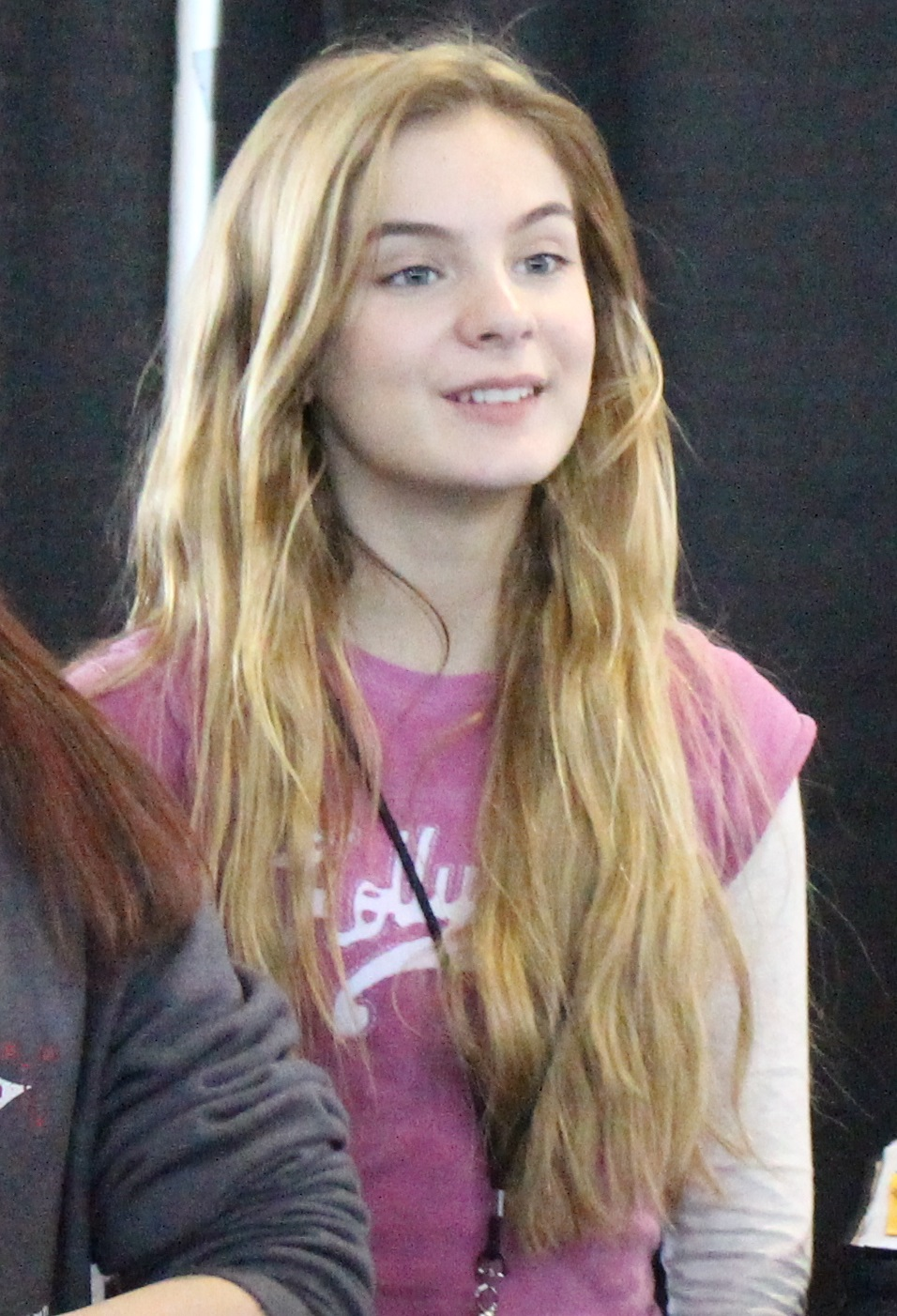
Sharbino in 2015

In 2017, Sharbino played the role of Tiffany Hart in the film Bitch. That same year, she had a guest role as Mandy Fowler in an episode of Law and Order: Special Victims Unit; and appeared in Growing Up Smith, a coming of age comedy about growing up in small town USA in 1979 in which Sharbino played the role of Amy. The film won numerous best audience awards and jury awards at film festivals, including the Woodstock, Naples, CAAMFest and Prescott festivals.

In 2018, Sharbino acted alongside her older sister Saxon in the film Urban Country; she played the role of Faith, a teenager that moves to a horse ranch to help her ill mother.

In 2019, she starred as antagonist Allison Betts in season 1 of the Brat web series Zoe Valentine and appeared in the drama film American Skin. She starred in the 2020 Snap Original series Players. In 2022, Sharbino portrayed the younger version of Brooke Shields in Hulu’s Welcome to Chippendales.

== Personal life ==
Sharbino plays the piano and took parkour classes with her younger brother.

== Filmography ==
=== Film ===
Year	Title	Role	Notes
2010	Changing	Kindergartener	Short
2010	Cool Dog	Sharon's Sister	Direct to video
2010	The Death of Socrates	Granddaughter	
2012	Promesas	Abigail	Short
2013	Cheap Thrills	Luann	
2013	Plato's Symposium	Socrates Granddaughter	
2015	Growing Up Smith	Amy	
2016	Miracles from Heaven	Abby Beam	
2017	Bitch	Tiffany Hart	
2017	The Above	TBA	Short
2017	Christmas in the Heartland	Jessie Wilkins	
2018	Urban Country	Faith	
2019	American Skin	Megan	
2019	Radioflash	Reese	
2020	Beckman	Tabitha	
2023	The Man in the White Van	Swimmer	

=== Television ===
Year	Title	Role	Notes
2008	Friday Night Lights	Emotional Fan	Episode: "Every Rose Has Its Thorn"
2010	Hannah Montana	Cammi	Episode: "Hannah's Gonna Get This"
2011	Prime Suspect	Rita Tanner	Episode: "Carnivorous Sheep"
2012	The New Normal	Sarah	Episode: "Bryanzilla"
2013	NCIS	Young Abby Sciuto	Episode: "Hit and Run"
2013–2015	The Walking Dead	Lizzie Samuels	Recurring role (season 4); guest role (season 5); 9 episodes
2014	True Detective	Macie Hart	2 episodes
2014	Once Upon a Time	Young Ingrid	Episode: "The Snow Queen"
2017	Law & Order: Special Victims Unit	Mandy Fowler	Episode: "No Good Reason"
2018	Criminal Minds	Chelsea Davis	Episode: "The Tall Man"

=== Web ===
Year	Title	Role	Notes
2019	Zoe Valentine	Allison Betts	Main role (season 1)
2020	Players	Jojo	Main role; also producer

=== Music videos ===
Song	Year	Artist	Notes
Jingle Bell Rock	2018	Lexi Jayde	

== Audio ==
Year	Title	Role	Notes
2020	The Shadow Diaries	Teeny	
