= Hit and Run (NCIS) =

- NCIS episode
- One of Abby's flashbacks
- Episode no.: Season 10; Episode 13
- Directed by: Dennis Smith
- Written by: Gary Glasberg and Gina Lucita Monreal
- Original air date: January 29, 2013

Guest appearances
- Brighton Sharbino as Young Abby Sciuto; Michael McGrady as Walter Dunn; Ed Kerr as Scott Cutwright; Michelle Clunie as Meredith Dunn; Robert Catrini as Jake Ford; Drew Rausch as Brandon Singer; Melody Butiu as Patricia Richert; Sy Richardson as Lester; Richard Balin as Marty; Michael Eaddy as Ricki's Father; Judith Drake as Delores; Cole Sand as Young Luca Sciuto; Corinne Massiah as Ricki Evans

Episode chronology
← Previous "Shiva"	Next → "Canary"
- NCIS season 10

"Hit and Run" is the thirteenth episode of the tenth season of the American police procedural drama NCIS, and the 223rd episode overall. It originally aired on CBS in the United States on January 29, 2013. The episode is written by Gary Glasberg and Gina Lucita Monreal and directed by Dennis Smith, and was seen by 22.07 million viewers.

== Plot ==
The team investigates a car crash where a Marine and a woman are found dead. They initially believe it is a murder-suicide, due to both victims coming from feuding families. However, Abby reveals that both victims were already dead before the car crashed, meaning a third suspect is responsible. Unfortunately, the case reminds Abby of her first "case" as a young girl, where she tracked down another girl, Ricki, to return her teddy bear. However, Ricki cannot take back the bear since it came from her grandfather, with whom her father has cut off all ties. Abby then tracks down the grandfather, but he is unwilling to confront Ricki's father. Remembering her failure to reunite Ricki's family causes Abby to fall into a depression, and she calls in sick for the first time in her career. Meanwhile, the team manages to figure out that the victims were in fact trying to get married, but lost their money to a Ponzi scheme set up by the Marine's cousin. When confronted, the cousin murdered both of them to keep them quiet. Gibbs then meets Abby and encourages her by telling her actions can do good, even if she isn't aware of it. Abby then remembers the final part of her first case, where she gives Ricki her own stuffed rabbit instead of the bear, with Abby's brother pointing out that Ricki will remember that simple act of kindness forever. In the present, Gibbs gives back to Abby the cookie fortune she had given him after their first case together, which reads "Today's new friend is tomorrow's family".

== Production ==
"Hit and Run" is written by Gary Glasberg and Gina Lucita Monreal and directed by Dennis Smith. "It all started with a photo – Pauley Perrette as a little girl", Monreal said about how Glasberg "knew the story of little Abby on her first case could be magic". Instead of looking back at "her first days of working at NCIS" Glasberg was more interested in "When did Abby first start develop an interest in forensics? And in people? In bodies, and in clues, things like that?" To explore Abby's "first case" the episode "gets her thinking about a situation from her past".

On December 9, 2012, TV Line announced the casting of Brighton Sharbino as 10-year-old Abby Sciuto.

The episode marks the 50th episode for director Smith, who directed his first episode back in 2003, the season 1 episode "High Seas".

== Reception ==
"Hit and Run" was seen by 22.07 million live viewers following its broadcast on January 29, 2013, with a 3.8/10 share among adults aged 18 to 49. A rating point represents one percent of the total number of television sets in American households, and a share means the percentage of television sets in use tuned to the program. In total viewers, "Hit and Run" easily won NCIS and CBS the night. The spin-off NCIS: Los Angeles drew second and was seen by 17.30 million viewers. Compared to the last episode "Shiva", "Hit and Run" was down in both viewers and adults 18–49.

Douglas Wolfe from TV Fanatic gave the episode 5 (out of 5) and stated that "This episode was poignant and touching, as it revealed some of Abby's sad back story in a memory from what she considered her first "case". I was amazed at the subtle and careful scene between Gibbs and Abby at the end." The casting of Brighton Sharbino was praised for both her performance and her strong physical resemblance to Pauley Perrette. During a Round Table Q&A for the episode, Steve Marsi from TV Fanatic said, "The link between the present case and the flashbacks felt a bit weak to me. I mean that beyond just the windshield crack; I kept waiting for a stronger link between the two that never came," but added that, "I was most moved by Abby's fear that she isn't good enough, her desire to help people - from her childhood to the present day where she spends time with senior citizens outside of work - and struggling to come to grips with the fact that you can't always win." Eric Hochberger remarked, "I'll say again (and any regular reader of our Round Tables knows this) how much I love Abby and Pauley's portrayal of her. Sometimes it feels like present Abby acted a bit too much like her childhood self. Linking past and present is one thing, and of course, some things are going to really strike a chord. But I felt like she should have progressed more, if that makes any sense."
