= You Better Watch Out (NCIS) =

- NCIS episode
- Episode no.: Season 10; Episode 10
- Directed by: Tony Wharmby
- Written by: George Schenck and Frank Cardera
- Original air date: December 18, 2012

Guest appearances
- Robert Wagner as Anthony DiNozzo, Sr.; Danielle Bisutti as Secret Service Special Agent Ashley Winter; Rose Rollins as Navy Lieutenant Commander Megan Huffner; David Dean Bottrell as Assistant Director of Operations Donald Linder; Joe O'Connor as Pat Gillespie; Diane Robin as Jennifer; Devin McGinn as Stewart Dorfman; Ted Baker as Navy Lieutenant Joe Baker

Episode chronology
← Previous "Devil's Trifecta"	Next → "Shabbat Shalom"
- NCIS season 10

"You Better Watch Out" is the tenth episode of the tenth season of the American police procedural drama NCIS, and the 220th episode overall. It originally aired on CBS in the United States on December 18, 2012. The episode is written by George Schenck and Frank Cardea and directed by Tony Wharmby, and was seen by 19.59 million viewers.

== Plot ==
The NCIS team investigates the murder of a man found dead at Patuxent River Station by his wife who had just returned from six months at sea on a deployment. After discovering the man had a $100 bill that has not been put in circulation yet, they team up with very abrupt and bossy Secret Service Agent Winter to find the rest of the money. Meanwhile, Tony's father, Anthony DiNozzo, Sr. (Robert Wagner), comes to stay with Tony for Christmas, causing some friction between the two as they have never managed to spend a whole Christmas together in years. Senior is a bit distressed that his son's apartment is rather sparsely decorated, and tries to get him into the spirit of Christmas when he notices that Tony does not have a Christmas tree.

Fingerprints on the $100 bill lead them to a man fired from the Bureau of Engraving and Printing for poor performance and drinking on the job, but was there when the new $100 were being created. After McGee and Dinozzo find $400,000 of the new $100 hidden in the navy husband's home, they discover the husband and the ex-employee were barflys at the same place, and that the husband took out a $10,000 credit card loan to pay for the new bills. After hikers find the employee's body in a ditch, Gibbs has to distract Agent Winter to prevent her from trying to take the case off them.

They discover that the bills belonged to a batch that was scheduled to be destroyed, the employee stole them by throwing them in with the regular trash in preparation for when they entered circulation but sold them to his bar friend for quick cash. Tracking the garbage truck to the landfill used at the time, They learn the theft occurred the night Navy SEALs killed Bin Laden. To try and get satellite surveillance of the theft, Gibbs is forced to ask Agent Winter for help, and using that information, the team tracks down the culprit responsible for both the theft and the murder. However, in exchange for the satellite, Winter takes the full credit for the arrest and the recovery of the bills.

Tony gets irritated with his father trying to force things by making up for so many missed Christmases in one go, but eventually kicks him out after catching him in bed with a neighbor. Tony and his dad eventually reunite for NCIS' annual tradition of watching It's a Wonderful Life.

== Production ==
"You Better Watch Out" is written by George Schenck and Frank Cardera and directed by Tony Wharmby. This was the fourth time Robert Wagner guest starred as Tony's father, and in the episode the writers "thought he should just be himself and come to visit Tony for the Christmas holiday". It's the second "Christmas episode" for Schenck and Cardea together with director Wharmby, the first being the season 6 (Note: stated as season 7 in the reference, but the episode occurred in season 6.) episode "Silent Night" in 2008. "We thought it was the perfect time, after ten seasons, to finally see where Tony, Jr. lives", the writers said. "The apartment is kind of like Tony himself; it has all this potential, but then it just stops short of the mark", according to Michael Weatherly, who portrays Tony. Executive producer Mark Horowitz "was a single man for a long time, and [...] lived very much like this for a number of years", which also is the "theme" for Tony's apartment. "He’s a single man and, really, getting married really isn’t in his plans".

It is also revealed that Tony has a pet, the Goldfish named Kate, which refers to NCIS special agent Kate Todd who died in the season two finale "Twilight". As for the name Weatherly said "we had two 13-year-old girls on set one day visiting [...], [and] the girls came up with "Kate", so we made it so".

The premise for the episode, "uncirculated new U.S. $100 bills", is based on a true story. "Years ago we heard the Treasury Department would be putting them out in 2011 and, when that didn’t happen, we researched their fate and thought it would make an interesting story if our NCIS team came across a hundred-dollar note before it was supposed to go public".

== Reception ==
"You Better Watch Out" was seen by 19.59 million live viewers following its broadcast on December 18, 2012, with a 3.3/10 share among adults aged 18 to 49. A rating point represents one percent of the total number of television sets in American households, and a share means the percentage of television sets in use tuned to the program. In total viewers, "You Better Watch Out" easily won NCIS and CBS the night. The spin-off NCIS: Los Angeles drew second and was seen by 15.48 million viewers. Compared to the last episode "Devil's Trifecta", "You Better Watch Out" was up in both viewers and adults 18–49.

Douglas Wolfe from TV Fanatic gave the episode 5 (out of 5) and stated that "Simply put, this was one of the best NCIS Season 10 episodes so far. And it was almost exclusively the Tony show too. The bigger surprise was a visit by Tony Sr., who blithely chose to bunk with his son instead of staying at a hotel. End result: we got to learn so much more about them both.
