= Prime Suspect (NCIS) =

- NCIS episode
- Episode no.: Season 10; Episode 17
- Directed by: James Whitmore, Jr.
- Written by: George Schenck and Frank Cardea
- Original air date: March 5, 2013

Guest appearances
- Matt L. Jones as Probationary Agent Ned Dorneget; Mathew St. Patrick as Metro Detective Quinton Shard; Keir O'Donnell as Ramsey Boone; Paul Cassell as Bart Crowley; Jay Acovone as Frankie Dean; Derek Magyar as Cameron Dean; Andrea Bogart as Melissa Tourney; Dio Johnson as Marine Lance Corporal Douglas Alexander; Jamie Hill as Chloe Chandler

Episode chronology
← Previous "Detour"	Next → "Seek"
- NCIS season 10

"Prime Suspect" is the 17th episode of the tenth season of the American police procedural drama NCIS, and the 227th episode overall. It originally aired on CBS in the United States on March 5, 2013. The episode is written by George Schenck and Frank Cardea and directed by James Whitmore, Jr., and was seen by 20.81 million viewers.

Gibbs tries to help clear his barber's son's name after the barber suspects his son may be a murderer. Meanwhile, Tony takes Probationary Agent Ned Dorneget on his first undercover assignment.

== Plot ==
Gibbs' barber Frankie asks him to find out if his son Cameron, a former Navy enlistee, was the "Dead Rose Slasher" - the nickname given to a serial killer who targets young female drug addicts - due to Cameron's physical resemblance to the photofit issued by the Metro Police. Frankie is worried Cameron might be involved due to his temper. Abby and her friend from the Metro PD's forensics lab pull an all-nighter while Ducky calls in a favor as they try to find out who the murderer is.

At the same time, the team is tasked with tracking down a Marine lance corporal who has absconded to the Caribbean with over $120,000 in cash from the cash sales office he was assigned to. Tony is sent to the Bahamas to stake out for the lance corporal along with probie agent Ned "Dorney" Dorneget and takes the opportunity to "probie" him like he did with McGee during Seasons 1–3, much to Ziva's amusement.

== Production ==
"Prime Suspect" was written by George Schenck and Frank Cardea and directed by James Whitmore, Jr. Schenck and Cardea wanted a "long-time friend" to seek Gibbs' help, "someone the viewers would know has been a part of Gibbs’ life for, at least, the past ten years". About how the writers chose Gibbs' barber, they said "That's when it came to us…that singular haircut! Let’s make it Gibbs’ barber who needs his help."

The character of Gibbs' barber was named Frankie Dean, a name taken from the stylists on the show, Frankie Fontaine and Carla Dean. Additionally, Carla Dean "is the one who has given Mark [Harmon] (portraying Leroy Jethro Gibbs) his haircuts since Day One", the writers said.

Although some scenes in the episode was set in Grand Bahama they were "actually shot at Mandalay Bay in Oxnard, California". The scenes are both sunny and hot, but when shooting "it was one of the coldest days of the year at the beach". According to Schenck and Cardea, "Crew members were bundled in parkas, and the actors and extras had to pretend to be warm in skimpy beachwear".

== Reception ==
"Prime Suspect" was seen by 20.81 million live viewers following its broadcast on March 5, 2013, with a 3.4/10 share among adults aged 18 to 49. A rating point represents one percent of the total number of television sets in American households, and a share means the percentage of television sets in use tuned to the program. In total viewers, "Prime Suspect" easily won NCIS and CBS the night. The spin-off NCIS: Los Angeles drew second and was seen by 16.24 million viewers. Compared to the last episode "Detour", "Prime Suspect" was even in both viewers and adults 18–49.

Douglas Wolfe from TV Fanatic gave the episode 4.2/5 and stated that "Episodes like this are so welcome - when almost all of the cast gets a small but meaty role to play. [...] Frankly, I had a problem with the outcome of the "Dead Rose Slasher" case. The show was otherwise light and a bit surprising with all of the relational subplots - and there were so many of them."
