= Detour (NCIS) =

- NCIS episode
- Episode no.: Season 10; Episode 16
- Directed by: Mario Van Peebles
- Written by: Steven D. Binder
- Original air date: February 26, 2013

Guest appearances
- Valerie Cruz as Anna; Robert Gant as Mike Dunkel; Ricky Whittle as Lincoln; Joe Reegan as Marcus; JoNell Kennedy as Navy Commander Lisa Cleveland; Peter Breitmayer as Dwight Romano; Valerie Wildman as Valerie Kordish; Brent McGregor as Rodney Romano

Episode chronology
| ← Previous "Hereafter" | Next → "Prime Suspect" |
- NCIS season 10

"Detour" is the sixteenth episode of the tenth season of the American police procedural drama NCIS, and the 226th episode overall. It originally aired on CBS in the United States on February 26, 2013. The episode is written by Steven D. Binder and directed by Mario Van Peebles, and was seen by 20.69 million viewers.

== Plot ==
Ducky and Palmer are called out to investigate the mysterious suicide of a Navy Lieutenant, but are kidnapped on the way back to NCIS headquarters. They are then forced to perform an autopsy on the lieutenant's corpse in order to find an important item he was carrying. Meanwhile, the rest of the team discovers that the dead lieutenant is in fact a Cuban spy who has been living under the lieutenant's identity after the real person with that identity died. He joined the Navy and worked his way into the security apparatus in order to steal classified files. The people who kidnapped Ducky and Palmer are his handlers. Both Ducky and Palmer escape after outwitting their captors and are rescued by the rest of the team, who managed to track them. Thanks to a ruse set up by Ducky and Palmer, the team is able to apprehend the lead handler and recover the stolen files.

== Production ==
"Detour" was written by Steven D. Binder and directed by Mario Van Peebles. Executive producer Gary Glasberg asked Binder to "think of an episode about what happens when [Ducky and Palmer] leave the crime scene with the body and all the little details of what happens in their van." According to Binder, "The core of this episode came from a simple question: what happens on a typical day when Ducky and Jimmy Palmer drive off from a crime scene?". The tour back to the NCIS base has never been shown before, but "this time we do – though the drive home isn’t exactly typical", Binder continues. As with every episode, it has its "own unique challenges". Ducky and Palmer's escape, with only "their expertise…and a dead body" was this episode's challenge.

Although the episode included scenes from a forest, the episode wasn't shot in a forest. Instead, "the fake forest" was built by the production design team. "Stage 5 actually looked more like a real forest than the real forest we used for a few establishing shots", according to Binder.

== Reception ==
"Detour" was seen by 20.69 million live viewers following its broadcast on February 26, 2013, with a 3.4/10 share among adults aged 18 to 49. A rating point represents one percent of the total number of television sets in American households, and a share means the percentage of television sets in use tuned to the program. In total viewers, "Detour" easily won NCIS and CBS the night. The spin-off NCIS: Los Angeles drew second and was seen by 17.02 million viewers. Compared to the previous episode "Hereafter", "Detour" was down in both viewers and adults 18–49.

Douglas Wolfe from TV Fanatic gave the episode 4.0/5 and stated that "This week's Ducky and Palmer Show was a welcome change from the usual NCIS storyline. I expected to be bored with this plot, but found myself intrigued instead. The most compelling scene of the episode was Jimmy Palmer's adamant refusal to leave Ducky to the mercy of their kidnappers."
