= Jill Parr =

American singer

- Born: Jill Parr
- Origin: Detroit, MI, United States
- Genres: CCM; Rock; Pop
- Occupations: singer, songwriter
- Instrument: vocals
- Years active: 1999-present
- Label: Whiplash Records

Jill Parr (born in Burton, Michigan) is a contemporary Christian musician.

== Biography ==
Jill Parr is a Christian recording artist with four albums. Her self-titled debut was released in 1999 on Absolute Records. The second album, Orbit, was released on September 23, 2003 (Christian Records) with the title track charting on Christian radio playlists. After the collapse of Christian Records, following the release of the Orbit album, Jill and husband/producer, Brian Hardin, formed Whiplash Records. Parr's album, Me Again, was released on Whiplash Records in the fall of 2006. The album's first single, "Reach", reached the top 10 on the Radio & Records Christian CHR chart.

Jill is married to producer/record label executive Brian Hardin.

== Mission statement ==
"My mission is to fear God, to let the roots of faith go deep, to trust without question and to encourage others along the same path. My heart is to recapture the imagination of women stuck in the mundane; to reclaim the dreams that God has given and to dare those who have never felt purpose for their lives to learn what God has placed them here for. My passion is to remind people how God looks on them with love and longing and I'm out to accomplish this one person at a time. " (Jill Parr, Official MySpace Page, 2006.)

== Discography ==
- 1998: Jill Parr
- 2003: Orbit
- 2006: Me Again
- 2016: I Still Want More
