= Devil's Trifecta =

- NCIS episode
- Episode no.: Season 10; Episode 9
- Directed by: Arvin Brown
- Written by: Steven D. Binder
- Original air date: December 11, 2012

Guest appearances
- Joe Spano as Senior FBI Agent Tobias Fornell; Melinda McGraw as Diane Sterling; Danny Nucci as Gordon Fremont; Colby French as Viggo Kiln; Will Beinbrink as Oliver Lambert; J. Downing as Avis Boyle; Trevor Torseth as Al Parker; Noree Victoria as Female Guest; Brendan Bradley as Male Guest

Episode chronology
← Previous "Gone"	Next → "You Better Watch Out"
- NCIS season 10

"Devil's Trifecta" is the ninth episode of the tenth season of the American police procedural drama NCIS, and the 219th episode overall. It originally aired on CBS in the United States on December 11, 2012. The episode is written by Steven D. Binder and directed by Arvin Brown, and was seen by 17.65 million viewers.

Diane, the ex-wife of Gibbs and Fornell, returns in the middle of an NCIS investigation.

== Plot ==
FBI Agent Tobias Fornell is attacked by a gunman at a drive-thru, but is protected by a bulletproof vest and manages to return fire and kill the shooter. Since the shooter is identified as a Navy Seaman, Gibbs and the NCIS team are called in to investigate. The sailor, Tyler Brown, had Fornell's car license number written on a matchbook, indicating that he was deliberately targeted.

The matchbook leads Gibbs and Fornell to a bar where Tyler moonlighted as a bouncer. While they are questioning the bartender, their mutual ex-wife, Diane Sterling, emerges from the bathroom. She claims to be conducting an audit for the I.R.S., but the bartender speaks up, saying she had expressed interest in buying the bar. Gibbs and Fornell arrest her on a charge of lying to federal agents, but Director Vance steps in and informs them that Diane is now a Special Agent for the I.R.S.'s Criminal Investigation Division, and she was on an undercover assignment at the bar, investigating a massive tax fraud case - someone has been stealing hundreds of identities, submitting false tax returns in their names and collecting millions in illicit refunds. She was using her old I.D. from her marriage to Fornell (because of "budget cuts") and sheepishly admits that was probably why Brown was ordered to kill him. Vance then informs Gibbs, Fornell and Diane that they have been ordered to work on the case together - to their shared horror.

The team guesses that Seaman Brown was responsible for stealing the identities of patrons at the bar, and acted as hired muscle, but someone else is the mastermind. Their first suspect is an accountant named Oliver Lambert. When they raid his house they find a number of freezers, one of which contains the body of another patron of the bar.

After Lambert himself (who was helping smuggle the fake IDs to Asia inside fish shipments) turns up, only to end up dying from stab wounds, they realize the real killer is Gordon Freemont, one of Lambert's clients. Freemont was actually running a smuggling operation. They catch up to him at a wedding reception, where he tries to kidnap Diane, which Gibbs averts by delivering a fake proposal to his ex-wife.

A subplot of the episode is the way Diane interacts with the team. She tells Ziva she is taking a break from her husband, Victor Sterling, but lets slip to McGee that Victor is leaving her. She and McGee also fall asleep while talking, so rumors circulate that they slept together, infuriating Fornell and amusing DiNozzo. Fornell also tells Gibbs that Diane specifically requested transfer to his jurisdiction.

Diane visits Gibbs in private and thanks him for saving her life. They both refer to their last private conversation, during the events of "Devil's Triangle", when she said that Gibbs never loved any woman except his first wife, Shannon, but Diane loved him just as much. She now admits that she might have been wrong to say Gibbs never loved her at all. Gibbs advises her to forgive Victor for being himself and not someone else; their marriage failed because he couldn't let go of his attachment to Shannon, and hers will fail if she doesn't let go of her attachment to him, "and the last thing you want to be is me." Diane agrees to consider this advice, and asks Gibbs how he feels about living his life alone. He replies, "I’m not alone."

== Production ==
"Devil's Trifecta" is written by Steven D. Binder and directed by Arvin Brown. The episode marks the return of Gibbs' ex-wife Diane Sterling (Melinda McGraw), first seen in the season nine episode "Devil's Triangle". On October 16, 2012, TV Line reported the return of both Diane Sterling and Tobias Fornell (Joe Spano), where Sterling "has to work undercover" with Gibbs and Fornell".

In Diane's first episode, she comes to Gibbs and Fornell for help in finding her missing husband, but in this episode the writer wanted to "put her on more even footing - to even make her an equal, if possible. [...] The thought of her throwing a badge in Fornell’s face was too good to pass up."

== Reception ==
"Devil's Trifecta" was seen by 17.65 million live viewers following its broadcast on December 11, 2012, with a 2.8/8 share among adults aged 18 to 49. A rating point represents one percent of the total number of television sets in American households, and a share means the percentage of television sets in use tuned to the program. In total viewers, "Devil's Trifecta" easily won NCIS and CBS the night. The spin-off NCIS: Los Angeles drew second and was seen by 15.12 million viewers. Compared to the last episode "Gone", "Devil's Trifecta" was down in both viewers and adults 18-49.

Mary Powers from TV Fanatic gave the episode 4.7 (out of 5) and stated that "If there is an episode that features Gibbs and Fornell, you can almost guarantee it to be a hoot-feast, and tonight's episode was no exception. As serious as the episode began with Fornell almost being killed, it quickly turned into one laugh right after another when the center of the entire mess turns out to be Gibbs and Fornell's mutual ex-wife, Diane Sterling (Melinda McGraw)."
