= Squall (NCIS) =

- NCIS episode
- Episode no.: Season 10; Episode 19
- Directed by: Tom Wright
- Written by: Bill Nuss
- Original air date: March 26, 2013

Guest appearances
- Jamey Sheridan as Navy Admiral John McGee; Joel Gretsch as NCIS Special Agent Stan Burley; Reggie Austin as Navy Lieutenant Carlton Mane; Russell Sams as Navy Petty Officer Second Class Daniel Graves; Zane Holtz as Navy Petty Officer Third Class Kevin Wyeth; Cooper Thornton as Navy Captain Peter Vandevere; Ser'Darius Blain as Tall Player; Jesse Carere as Navy Seaman Eric Landis; Fernando Rivera as Navy Seaman Mark Forrest; Braxton Beckham as Adam Tepper; Josh Rubenstein as WJGZ Meteorologist Josh Rosen; Jackie Johnson as ZNN Meteorologist Chelsea Mills; Luke White as EMT

Episode chronology
| ← Previous "Seek" | Next → "Chasing Ghosts" |
- NCIS season 10

"Squall" is the 19th episode of the tenth season of the American police procedural drama NCIS, and the 229th episode overall. It originally aired on CBS in the United States on March 26, 2013. The episode is written by Bill Nuss and directed by Tom Wright, and was seen by 18.62 million viewers.

The team investigates the death of a navy medical officer aboard a ship that went through a storm. The prime suspect turns out to be a 4-star admiral, who is also McGee's estranged father.

== Plot ==
The body of a navy medical officer is found during a storm at sea and quickly determined to have been murdered. The team leaves to investigate at the scene, but McGee is late as a result of being with Adam, a middle school-aged boy he is spending time with through a Big Brothers Big Sisters program. When he arrives at the ship, he encounters his father, John McGee, a 4-star admiral. It immediately becomes apparent that their relationship is somewhat strained.

Meanwhile, Tony and Ziva come across NCIS Agent Stan Burley, who assists in the investigation. Tony shortly afterwards becomes concerned that Burley is attempting to flirt with Ziva, who is "vulnerable" due to her father's recent death, telling McGee, "You see he would use that to his advantage. Swoop right in, like a hawk going after a sweet, innocent, furry little Israeli." However, when Tony speaks with Burley, the latter responds by announcing that he is engaged to be married.

McGee briefly considers quitting the Big Brothers Big Sisters program, but decides against it and encourages Adam to stand up to a bully.

Numerous potential killers are introduced. It is discovered that there was a drug problem on the ship, though all related suspects are cleared. The admiral later becomes a suspect, prompting him to admit that he has cancer, though he is also cleared. Later, it is found that John McGee's aide had killed the medic in order to prevent the news of the cancer from being released.

As the episode closes, McGee decides to attempt to repair his relationship with his father.

== Production ==
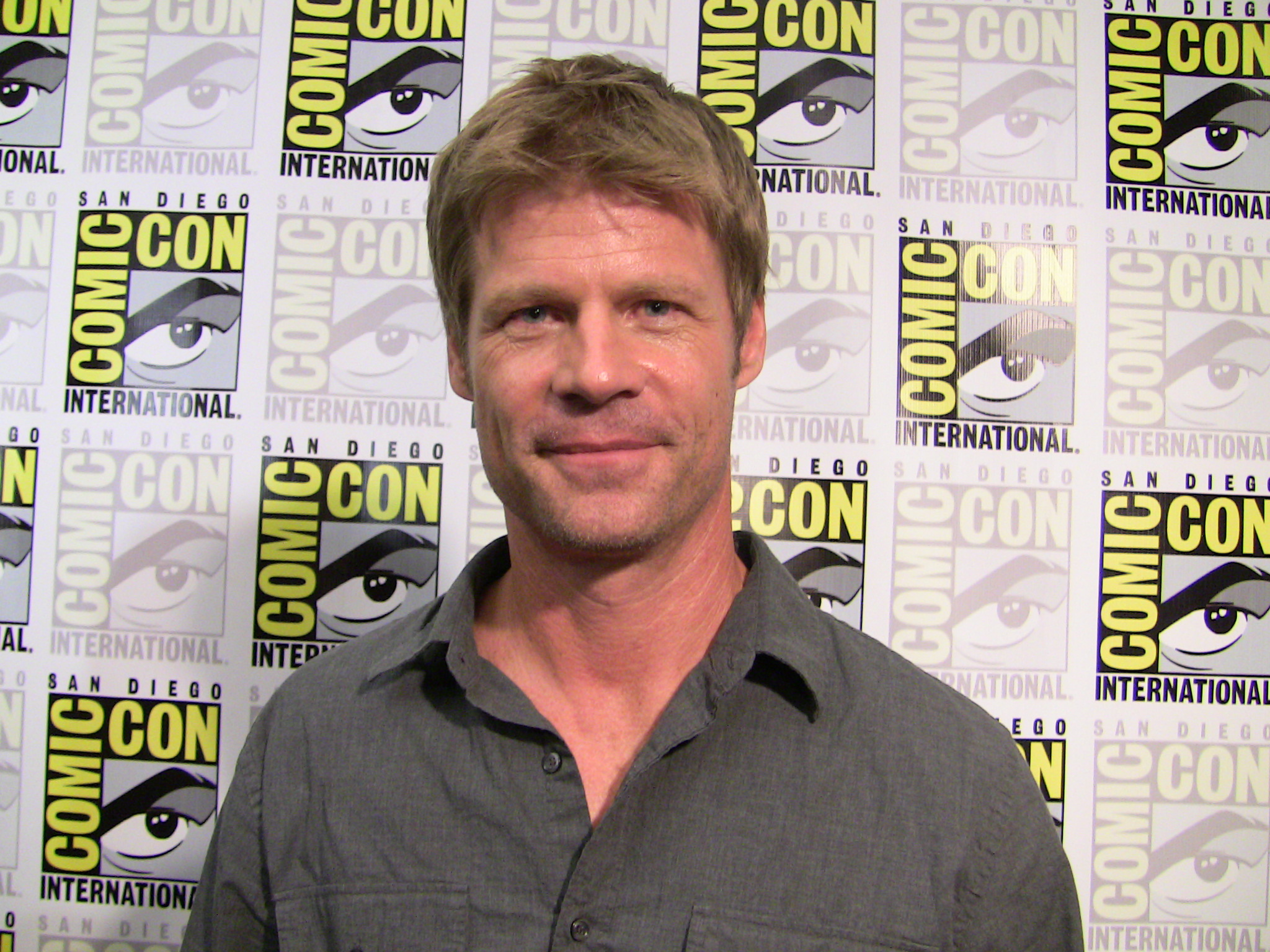
Joel Gretsch reprised his role as Stan Burley.

"Squall" is written by Bill Nuss and directed by Tom Wright. This is Nuss' first episode on NCIS, and was written as a freelance assignment. "Sometimes episodes just come together beautifully", executive producer Gary Glasberg said about the episode. "Writing an NCIS is no easy task and Bill certainly rose to the occasion. I'm the first to admit I handed Bill a pretty tricky episode complete with significant visual effects, a touching story about McGee and his father, and a fun little runner revealing Tim as a "Big Brother" to a teenage boy", Glasberg continued.

As shown in other episodes in season 10, the theme "fallen heroes" also applies to Admiral McGee, diagnosed with stage four cancer.

On February 25, 2013, TV Line reported the casting of Jamey Sheridan as Timothy McGee's father, Admiral John McGee. Showrunner Gary Glasberg told TV Line that "The role of McGee’s father is complex and layered with some real surprises thrown in". He also mentioned Admiral McGee "will be part of what leads us into our final arc".

Joel Gretsch reprised his role as the recurring character NCIS special agent Stan Burley, last seen in the episode "Playing With Fire".

== Reception ==
"Squall" was seen by 18.62 million live viewers following its broadcast on March 26, 2013, with a 3.2/9 share among adults aged 18 to 49. A rating point represents one percent of the total number of television sets in American households, and a share means the percentage of television sets in use tuned to the program. In total viewers, "Squall" easily won NCIS and CBS the night. The spin-off NCIS: Los Angeles drew second and was seen by 14.53 million viewers. Compared to the last episode "Seek", "Squall" was down in viewers and even in adults 18–49.

Douglas Wolfe from TV Fanatic gave the episode 4.5/5 and stated that "You have to admire the work done by Jamey Sheridan as McGee's father: his portrayal of a charismatic boor was outstanding. I think that when an actor can portray a character which affects the viewer the way his did, it speaks loudly of his ability. [...] "Squall" introduced us to Tim's father as the Admiral of a ship on which a doctor was killed. It took the full episode to discover that Admiral McGee was suffering from stage-four cancer (we're not told what kind), and that his advancement to a cabinet-level post at the White House would be in jeopardy should anyone find out about his illness." Wolfe also criticized the choice to give McGee father issues, as it was previously established in earlier seasons that Gibbs, Ziva, and Tony all had difficult relationships with their fathers.
