= Ben McPherson =

- Born: Farmington, New Mexico, USA
- Occupation: Filmmaker
- Years active: 2007 - present
- Website: theartofbenmcpherson.com

Ben McPherson is an American filmmaker, screenwriter, and painter.

== Career ==
McPherson was born and raised in Farmington, New Mexico. He started working as an artist during high school. His work has been featured in Southwest Art Magazine and the American Art Collector

McPherson's artwork and creative process have attracted national attention, In 2007, McPherson was featured in God's Close-Up, the third episode of the Showtime television series This American Life. The segment was nominated for three television Emmy awards.

In 2013, McPherson wrote, produced, and directed the live stage production Man in the Moon. Shortly thereafter, Ben was hired to head up American Dream Labs, the new Film and Scripted Television division of Mercury Radio Arts.
