= Me Again =

Studio album by Jill Parr
- Released: December 11, 2006
- Recorded: 2006
- Genre: Christian
- Label: Whiplash Records
- Producer: Jill Parr, Brian Hardin

Jill Parr chronology
Orbit (2003)	''Me Again'' (2006)

Me Again is the third album from Christian recording artist Jill Parr, and the first album on the label Whiplash Records. Though Whiplash is an independent label, started by Jill and her husband Brian, her first single, "Reach" has been released to Christian radio stations everywhere; it peaked at #14 on Christian CHR charts. Me Again's second single, "The New Normal", was released to Christian radio on August 27, 2007, but it did not chart.

== Track listing ==
- Disc One (Me Again CD)
1. "Reach"
2. "The New Normal"
3. "Me Again"
4. "Have a Little Hope"
5. "Just The Way I Am"
6. "County Line"
7. "Where I Belong"
8. "Nothing Less, Nothing More"
9. "Rockstar"
10. "You Surround Me"
11. "County Line (Live)"
12. "I'll Stand By You" (iTunes Bonus Track)
- Disc Two (Bonus Enhanced Audio CD)
1. Song-By-Song: "Reach"
2. Song-By-Song: "The New Normal"
3. Song-By-Song: "Me Again"
4. Song-By-Song: "Have a Little Hope"
5. Song-By-Song: "Just The Way I Am"
6. Song-By-Song: "County Line"
7. Song-By-Song: "Where I Belong"
8. Song-By-Song: "Nothing Less Nothing More"
9. Song-By-Song: "Rockstar"
10. Song-By-Song: "You Surround Me"
11. Song-By-Song: "Conclusion"
12. "The Multiple Personalities of Jill Parr and Brian Hardin"
13. "The Whiplash Mission"
14. "A Word From Our Pastor"
15. "Daily Audio Bible Preview"
16. "Do You Hear What I Hear?"
17. "O Come All Ye Faithful"
18. "Reach (Instrumental)"
19. "I Want To See Jesus (Remix)"
20. "More From Whiplash"

Other enhanced material

- "Reach" music video
- "Behind Me Again with Jill" interview
- Daily Audio Bible video preview
- "Me Again" promo commercial
