= Shabbat Shalom (NCIS) =

- NCIS episode
- Ziva cries over her father's body
- Episode no.: Season 10; Episode 11
- Directed by: Dennis Smith
- Written by: Christopher J. Waild
- Original air date: January 8, 2013

Guest appearances
- Michael Nouri as Mossad Director Eli David; Paula Newsome as Jackie Vance; Nasser Faris as Arash Kazmi; Scott MacArthur as Navy Petty Officer Second Class Luke Grismer; Cameron Watson as Randy; Joe Martin Thomas as Navy Petty Officer Third Class Dion Kelso; Mateus Ward as Austin; Ryan Locke as Roland Ames; Bryan Lugo as Navy Petty Officer Third Class Bruce Smith; Russell Pitts as Navy Petty Officer Third Class Judd Norwood; Brent Chase as Navy Petty Officer Third Class Nathan Thomas; Jack Axelrod as Shmeil Pinkhas

Episode chronology
← Previous "You Better Watch Out"	Next → "Shiva"
- NCIS season 10

"Shabbat Shalom" is the eleventh episode of the tenth season of the American police procedural drama NCIS, and the 221st episode overall. It originally aired on CBS in the United States on January 8, 2013. The episode is written by Christopher J. Waild and directed by Dennis Smith, and was seen by 21.11 million viewers.

The episode centers on the return of Ziva's father, Mossad Director Eli David, whom she has not seen in more than two years. Eli claims to be repentant for some of his past choices and that his motives are pure, though Ziva expresses doubt over his sincerity. Meanwhile, the team investigates the death of a man dressed in a petty officer's uniform whose body was found in a lake.

"Shabbat Shalom" is part of a two-episode story arc, followed by "Shiva", in which two recurring characters (Eli David and Jackie Vance) were killed off in a single shootout. It also sets in motion a long-term storyline leading up to the NCIS season finale. "Shabbat Shalom" was the first NCIS episode of 2013 and was received with mostly positive reviews.

== Etymology ==
Shabbat shalom (שַׁבָּת שָׁלוֹם), which literally means "a peaceful Sabbath" in Hebrew, is a common greeting used in Israel on the Jewish Sabbath. Several characters in the episode — Ziva and Eli David, Jackie and Leon Vance — are shown observing the Shabbat shortly before the fatal shootout at the end.

== Background ==
NCIS follows a team of government agents who work for the Naval Criminal Investigative Service. The main cast includes Mark Harmon as team leader Leroy Jethro Gibbs, Michael Weatherly as Senior Agent Anthony "Tony" DiNozzo, Cote de Pablo as Mossad Liaison Officer turned NCIS Agent Ziva David, Pauley Perrette as Forensic Specialist Abby Sciuto, Sean Murray as Special Agent Timothy McGee, David McCallum as Autopsy Technician Donald "Ducky" Mallard, Rocky Carroll as NCIS Director Leon Vance, and Brian Dietzen as Medical Assistant Jimmy Palmer.

In previous years, Ziva's relationship with her father, Eli David, was scripted as complex; this is heightened during the seventh season when he orders her to continue on a hazardous assignment even after the risks made it a suicide mission. Cote de Pablo has opined, "These characters are able to justify [their actions] because they come from a country that's at war. You learn to sympathize with her dad, who's played so beautifully by Michael Nouri." Despite this, she considered her character's subsequent actions — cutting all ties with Eli — warranted.

Ziva later manages to partly reconcile with Eli, her only surviving relative, in the eighth season, though he remains estranged.

== Plot ==
In the opening scene, a father and son discover a man in a petty officer's uniform dead in a lake while fishing. Back at the NCIS squad room, Tony, McGee, and Ziva are sifting through a box of old undercover gear that is being thrown out to make more room for supplies. They reminisce about past cases, including one involving Ziva having to wear a prosthetic pregnant belly.

The team is called to the scene at the lake and quickly learns that the victim is not Navy personnel. Rather, he is a "government paparazzo" named Tyler Wilkes, a disgraced reporter who had lost credibility after distributing digitally altered photographs in the previous year. It is also found that, at the time of his death, Wilkes had been undercover working a story on alleged drug use in the Navy. The team narrows down four suspects who all confess to the murder, evidently believing that doing so will confuse the investigators and, in turn, clear them. Instead, Gibbs arrests each of them and puts them in separate holding cells. Ducky, on examining the body, realizes that the death was most likely an accident as the deceased had mono and died from internal bleeding due to a split in his liver. However, the perpetrator still attempted to hide the killing.

At the end of the day, Ziva leaves to find her father Eli is waiting for her at her car in the parking lot. He insists that he is in town to make amends with his daughter and that his intentions are honorable. Despite being suspicious, she cautiously accepts his efforts, though also informs Gibbs immediately, who tells Vance. The latter notes that Eli may be nearing retirement but fears that the presence of Iranian ambassador Arash Kazmi, with whom he had a possibly volatile history, will complicate the situation.

Ziva and Eli begin to repair their relationship, spending time together at a coffee shop and looking through photographs. Eli expresses particular interest in a picture of a "pregnant" Ziva, which had accidentally been mixed into the photo stack, asking if it was a boy or a girl. She at first deflects, reminding him that she was only undercover, but quickly admits that she would tell people that the baby was a girl when asked. Eli proceeds to discuss the possibility of retiring in the near future and asks that his visit "be the first step to [his] redemption."

Gibbs and Vance's fears of trouble with Kazmi and Eli are abated when they learn that the two are in fact negotiating a peace agreement. They arrange a meeting to explain that Kazmi and Eli had lived on opposite sides of the same stretch of the Green Line between Israel and Palestine, and that he and Eli had grown up knowing each other through the olive harvest. They request Vance's help with proceeding, who arranges for Eli and Ziva to come to his house for dinner.

Soon after, Ziva discovers that her father had accidentally killed Wilkes when the latter took pictures of him arriving at the airport. Eli had struggled with the reporter over the camera, causing his enlarged liver to burst. She confronts Eli shortly afterwards, who admits that he had covered Wilkes' death to prevent word from getting out that he was in Washington D.C., which would ruin the peace arrangements. Ziva is nonetheless furious and disheartened by this, but agrees to sit across from her father at the dinner table one last time.

Vance's wife Jackie prepares a Shabbat meal, and Eli tries to lighten the tension by saying the blessing and expressing thanks for "life, freedom, and family". However, Ziva is unable to continue and goes outside to call Gibbs and reveal the truth that Eli killed Wilkes. Then, an unknown assailant shoots up Vance's house. Ziva pursues the shooter, wounding him, and is joined by Gibbs, who rushes to the scene after hearing the gunshots. The shooter is cornered but commits suicide before he can talk with a cyanide cigarette.

Tony and McGee hurry to the site of the shootout and tend to the victims. However, Ziva returns to the house to find that Eli has been killed and breaks down sobbing, cradling his head and praying in Hebrew. Jackie is critically wounded and rushed to the hospital. After several hours in surgery, Vance emerges from the operating room and quietly states that his wife is dead, which has Gibbs devastated.

== Production ==
=== Writing ===
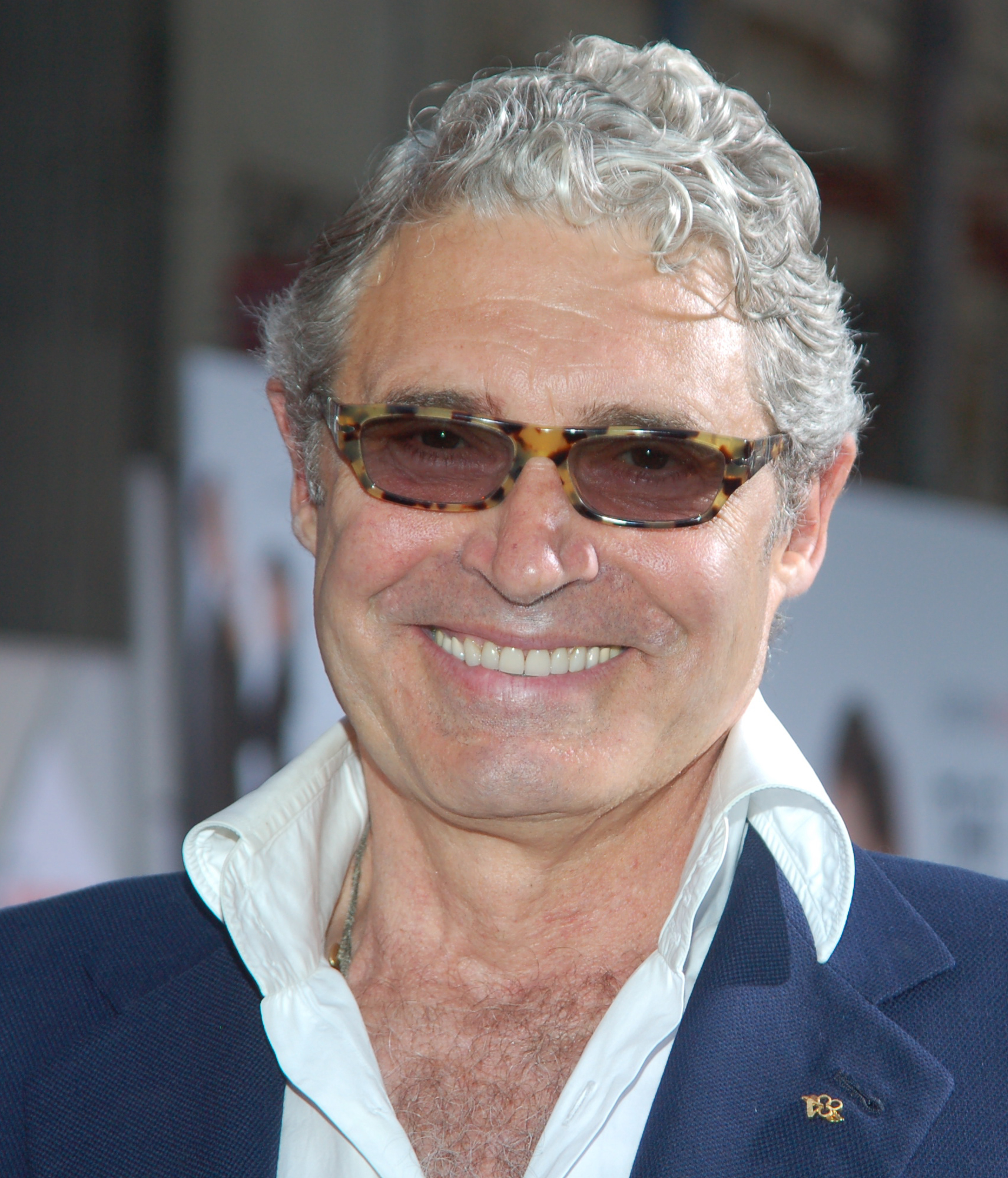
Michael Nouri guest starred as Ziva's father Eli David, who was killed in the episode.

"Shabbat Shalom" is written by Christopher J. Waild and directed by Dennis Smith. Executive producer Gary Glasberg began to consider possibly killing off Ziva's father and Vance's wife in the spring of 2012 and discussed the idea with Vance's portrayer, Rocky Carroll. Glasberg and Carroll agreed that the storyline would provide a more in-depth storyline for Vance, whose family life had always been relatively stable. Glasberg also approached Cote de Pablo, who plays Ziva, and discussed Eli's role in the series and how killing Ziva's last remaining family member would affect her character and personality. Both Paula Newsome and Michael Nouri, who portray Jackie Vance and Eli David respectively, were dismayed by the direction that the producers chose to take but decided to go forward with it and "give it everything they could".

The episode largely focuses on the relationship between Ziva and Eli and the latter's attempts to repent for his past wrongs, though Waild ultimately decided to kill off Eli without allowing them to reconcile. He explained:

"We've seen Ziva acting under her father's command. We've seen how Ziva has since forged relationships with Gibbs and the NCIS team that became stronger than blood. We've seen Eli struggle to hold onto a daughter as she slips away. And we've seen father and daughter come to a long-distance understanding that has held for the last two years. But in 'Shabbat Shalom,' I thought it would be interesting to explore the idea of Ziva and Eli trying to make things work on a more personal 'family' level. Eli is getting older, and has become more sentimental about the only family he has left. Ziva now has Gibbs as a trusted paternal figure, but a part of her still misses the man who taught her how to pray. Could these two equally headstrong but very different people actually work things out and become a real part of each other's lives? Ultimately, my answer was 'no.' Ziva has changed too much and Eli not enough. The fate of these characters is crushing, but deep down they both know it was inevitable."

Waild added that with the death of Jackie Vance "the tragedy of Ziva and Eli now also extends into the Vance family. Fitting, I think, given Eli and Vance were 'forged in blood.'" The killings continue the season's theme of fallen heroes. When questioned about the choice to kill off two characters in the same episode, particularly one that was not a finale or set during sweeps Glasberg responded, "I don't necessarily see that as ruthless. I have no problems coming up with stuff that keeps audiences on their toes." He concluded that he was very pleased with the final product.

=== Promotion ===
Minor details of the January plots were released a few months in advance. Glasberg first announced in October that there would be a "huge Ziva story" that would "rock Vance's world" following the Christmas break. Eli David's scheduled return was reported, and Cote de Pablo assured that, despite her character's tumultuous relationship with Michael Nouri's, the reunion would not be intentionally destructive on his part. "He comes to make peace with his daughter...but then drama unfolds," she relayed. Glasberg agreed, saying that the audience would most likely be surprised by the way they interacted in the episode.

De Pablo further commented, "It's an interesting thing to explore – and something we have never seen my character go through." However, despite focusing on Ziva and Vance, all of the characters would feel the repercussions of what would happen, and the events would be the start of a long-term story arc that would carry through the rest of the season. "I think it all sticks to the idea of knocking people down and picking them back up again, emotionally and psychologically," said Glasberg.

== Reception ==
=== Ratings ===
"Shabbat Shalom" was seen by 21.11 million live viewers following its broadcast on January 8, 2013, with a 3.5/10 share among adults aged 18 to 49. A rating point represents one percent of the total number of television sets in American households, and a share means the percentage of television sets in use tuned to the program. In total viewers, "Shabbat Shalom" easily won NCIS and CBS the night. The spin-off NCIS: Los Angeles drew second and was seen by 17.90 million viewers. Compared to the last episode "You Better Watch Out", "Shabbat Shalom" was up in both viewers and adults 18–49. It was also the season high in viewers when it aired, though it was surpassed by the following episode, "Shiva".

=== Critical reviews ===
Immediate reception was overwhelmingly positive. Douglas Wolfe from TV Fanatic gave the episode 5 (out of 5) and stated that "This story was amazing and filled with sadness. I cannot imagine a more compelling episode. The writing, the dialogue, the incredible performances all combined to a bring heartbreaking masterpiece to the small screen. I can't wait to see the second part of this story." Steve Marsi, also from TV Fanatic, called the episode "powerful and unexpected" and said in a round table, "Ziva screaming 'Abba' and bawling was enough to give anyone the chills, as was Gibbs standing stone-faced and ignoring the SecNav's calls. These scenes are enhanced by the fact that we're so invested in these characters after 10 seasons...Superb TV entertainment, but also emblematic of the uncertain times we live in." Eric Hochberger added, "Sometimes, I wish they wouldn't do this. Jackie in particular felt unnecessary to kill off. However, as Steve said, there's no denying the collective brilliance of the cast and writers last night and in similar episodes. So, I guess we have to trust them and see where they take this next week and beyond."

Bradley Adams of SpoilerTV.com wrote, "The final few minutes were incredibly emotional. Ziva's reaction to seeing her father's lifeless body was heartbreaking. Her shout of 'ABBA!' was enough to cause a robot to cry. We could all predict that Eli was going to die, but the way he was killed was unpredictable. At first thought, Jackie Vance's death seemed unnecessary. However, the anger and sadness shown by the Director when informing Gibbs 'My wife is dead', alongside Ziva's grief, was almost overwhelming. It left us with a brilliant cliffhanger.

Reviewers also praised the performances of Cote de Pablo and Rocky Carroll in the aftermath of Jackie Vance and Eli David's deaths, and Wolfe opined that the best scenes of the episode were a "three-way toss up: Ziva's agony over the death of her father was heartbreaking. The scene with Tony and Gibbs standing sentinel at the hospital waiting room was, I think, the best scene cinematically. So stark, and filled with such tension. I rewound it and watched it again. And finally, the dead look in Vance's eyes as he answer's Gibbs' question. 'She's dead. My wife is dead, Gibbs.'" Hochberger said, "Rocky and Cote were both amazing. The latter deserves Emmy consideration for this effort I'd say." Sandra Gonzalez from Entertainment Weekly wrote "Cote de Pablo was absolutely fantastic in this scene — the crying, the praying in Hebrew. If you weren’t crying right along with her, you’re stronger than I am." Later, TVLine named Cote de Pablo Performer of the Week, noting that "As Ziva set her own eyes upon Eli's lifeless body, de Pablo's expression instantly morphed from professional resolve into horror, as she cradled his head in her arms, the weeping visage of a little girl who'd lost her Abba. There was no holding back for de Pablo as the actress let her alter ego's emotions, and tears, flow, whispering a Hebrew prayer into her late father's ear."

Michelle Calbert from BuddyTV included "Shabbat Shalom" in her list of "The 10 Best Ziva Episodes" and wrote, "Ziva screaming for her father is one of the most heartbreaking and chilling moments we've seen from her in the entire series." A few weeks after the episode aired, Latina published a list of "Cote de Pablo's 15 Best 'NCIS' Moments" and included the scene of Ziva's reaction to her father's death, going on to describe de Pablo's performance as "Emmy-worthy" and "Shabbat Shalom" as "one of the show's most heartbreaking episodes."
