= Gone (NCIS) =

- NCIS episode
- Ziva and Abby try to help Lydia
- Episode no.: Season 10; Episode 8
- Directed by: James Whitmore, Jr.
- Written by: Reed Steiner and Scott Williams
- Original air date: November 27, 2012

Guest appearances
- Alex Kingston as Miranda Pennebaker; Kirsten Prout as Lydia Wade; Blake Robbins as Navy Commander Scott Martin; Jenny Cooper as Connie Martin; Kyle Davis as John 'Diesel' Stevens; Drew Powell as Fred Hadley; Joey Oglesby as Merle Axelrod; Wiley Pickett as Navy Captain David Wade; Madison McLaughlin as Rosie Martin; Alexa Fischer as Navy Commander Jennifer Wade; Jim Holmes as Edgar Hayes; Pat Lentz as Ginny Daniels; Jack Axelrod as Shmeil Pinkhas; Anita Kalathara as High School Kid #1; James Coholan as High School Kid #2

Episode chronology
← Previous "Shell Shock (Part II)"	Next → "Devil's Trifecta"
- NCIS season 10

"Gone" is the eighth episode of the tenth season of the American police procedural drama NCIS, and the 218th episode overall. It originally aired on CBS in the United States on November 27, 2012. The episode is written by Reed Steiner and Scott Williams and directed by James Whitmore, Jr., and was seen by 19.76 million viewers.

== Plot ==
A Naval Officer is murdered while attempting to prevent the kidnapping of his teenage daughter Lydia and her friend Rosie. Lydia escapes but witnesses the murder and Rosie is taken.

The team begins a search for the girl, at first suspecting a registered sex offender who had been stalking Rosie online, but he is cleared. Lydia repeatedly tries, without success, to give a description of the kidnappers. Ziva takes in the young girl whose mother is away serving on a carrier, and helps her cope with the loss of her father.

After learning that the abduction is related to human trafficking, Gibbs seeks the help of Miranda Pennebaker (Alex Kingston), a woman involved in illegal sales. She denies ever selling human beings but is able to steer him in the right direction.

Later, when one of the kidnappers is found dead after Rosie managed to use his phone to send a text message for help, Gibbs tells Ziva and Abby to stay with Lydia at his house and keep her safe. A man breaks into the house but is quickly taken down and brought in for questioning. Identified as a friend of Lydia and Rosie's families, he confesses to having been approached by human traffickers, who had offered him half a million dollars in exchange for helping them find two girls and to driving the van used to kidnap them. He had broken into the safe house after hearing that Lydia might be able to identify him.

With information from the man in custody, the team manages to arrest the kidnappers before Rosie is sold.

Meanwhile, Tony becomes jealous when he learns that Ziva is making plans with Shmeil, a friend from Israel. Shmeil turns out to be an elderly man who has known Ziva since she was three and they both invite Tony to have dinner with them.

== Production ==
"Gone" is written by Reed Steiner and Scott Williams, and directed by James Whitmore, Jr. The work on the episode began "with a simple question" to the writers from showrunner Gary Glasberg; "What new story could we tell that would bring Ziva David and Abby Sciuto together on a case?". These two characters rarely pair up on the show, but "through a common cause" the writers were able to make it happen, "and that cause became the welfare of a young teenage girl, who’s both mourning the death of her hero father and praying for the return of her missing best friend".

On October 3, 2012, TV Line announced that Alex Kingston was cast as Miranda Pennebaker, described as a "woman of questionable morals". Showrunner Gary Glasberg noted that Kingston "embodies everything I hoped for from this character. Heck, you might even see her again."

== Reception ==
"Gone" was seen by 19.76 million live viewers following its broadcast on November 27, 2012, with a 3.6/10 share among adults aged 18 to 49. A rating point represents one percent of the total number of television sets in American households, and a share means the percentage of television sets in use tuned to the program. In total viewers, "Gone" easily won NCIS and CBS the night. The spin-off NCIS: Los Angeles drew third and was seen by 14.49 million viewers. Compared to the last episode "Shell Shock (Part II)", "Gone" was up in both viewers and adults 18–49.

Mary Powers from TV Fanatic gave the episode 4.7 (out of 5) and stated that "Reviewing last week's NCIS, I said that it's rare for an episode to feature an extraordinary case, yet superb character development. Well, maybe that's not true. The CBS smash did it again on "Gone." Moreover, there was a good splash of humor, making for a nice, well-rounded episode."
