= Greg Germann =

American actor (born 1958)

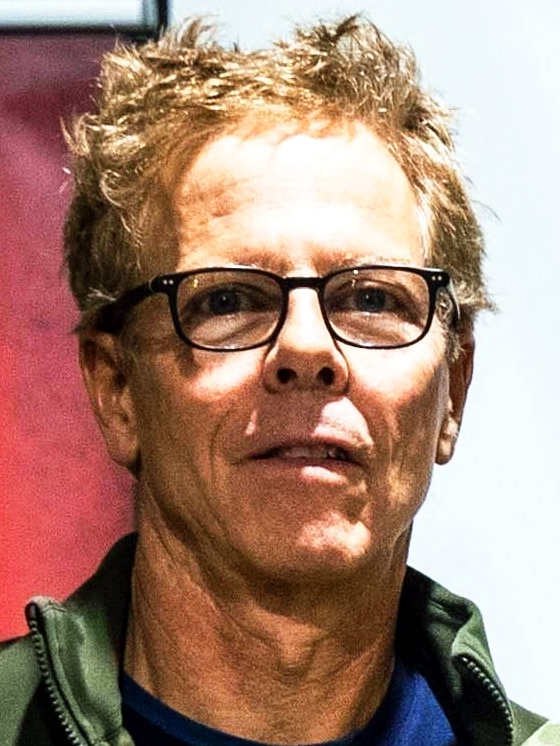
- Germann in 2022
- Born: February 26, 1958 (age 68); Houston, Texas, U.S.
- Occupations: Actor, TV personality, TV director, writer
- Years active: 1982–present
- Television: Eric "Rico" Moyer in Ned & Stacey; Richard Fish in Ally McBeal; Dr. Tom Koracick in Grey's Anatomy
- Spouse: Martha Champlin (m. 2013; sep. 2025)
- Children: Asa

Gregory Andrew Germann (/ˈɡɜːrmən/ GUR-mən; born February 26, 1958) is an American actor who is known for playing Richard Fish on the television series Ally McBeal, which earned him a Screen Actors Guild award. He also is known for his roles as Eric "Rico" Morrow on the sitcom Ned & Stacey, Dr. Tom Koracick in Grey's Anatomy and as Hades in Season Five of Once Upon a Time.

== Career ==
=== Early work ===
He started in several Broadway plays while in New York, including a role in 1982 alongside Matthew Broderick in the play Fancy This, which Germann also co-wrote. He received praise for roles in the 1982 musical Chicago, and the 1983 musical The Wizard of Oz. He continued to have roles in plays before seeing a poster for wanted actors for a film in 1985. He moved to Hollywood to find film success, and got his first role in the teen comedy film, The Whoopee Boys in 1986. The supporting role in that film helped Greg's career, so he could star in bigger and mainstream films. His next film was 1990's Child's Play 2, in which he played the character Mattson, in the well-received sequel to one of the most popular horror films of all time. Child's Play 2, and the 1991 romantic comedy Once Around, helped the actor gain mainstream success. In 1990, Germann originated the role of John Hinckley Jr. in Stephen Sondheim's Assassins.

=== 1990s success and Ally McBeal ===
After Child's Play 2 and Once Around were released, he gained fame as a character named Petey in the 1994 critical and commercial success Clear and Present Danger, and landed a supporting role as Rico on the sitcom Ned & Stacey, which lasted from 1995 to 1997.

In 1997, after Ned & Stacey, Germann was offered the role as Richard Fish on the legal-comedy series Ally McBeal which he played for five seasons, from 1997 to 2002. During this time, he received three nominations for the Screen Actors Guild awards, winning one. Germann directed a few Ally McBeal episodes, including "Fear of Flirting" (season 5, episode 4). He appeared on ABC's In Case of Emergency as Sherman Yablonsky until it was canceled after one season, and was also in the pilot episode of Eureka. He did not reprise the role, and his character's disappearance was explained in the official comic book as having been reassigned to Alaska.

=== 2000s work ===
After Ally McBeal ended Germann starred in several films, including Down to Earth, Sweet November, and Joe Somebody, all being released in 2001. He guest-appeared twice on The Bernie Mac Show.

He got lead roles in 2005 in the family comedies Family Plan and Down and Derby.

In 2006, he guest-starred in the series, Desperate Housewives.

In 2009, he starred in the Nickelodeon made-for-television musical film Spectacular!. He portrayed the role of Mr. Virgil Romano.

Also in 2009, Germann made a guest appearance on an episode of CSI: NY entitled Blacklist. In the episode, he played Victor Benton, a cancer patient and serial killer who is targeting health care providers for not getting him help, while also taunting NYPD Detective Mac Taylor (Gary Sinise) about his deceased father.

=== 2010s work ===
In 2010, he played Jerry Erickson in the holiday film The Santa Incident.

Germann has appeared in NCIS since the season 10 episode "Shiva", playing NCIS Assistant Director Jerome Craig. Later, in the episode "Canary", he briefly took over the agency while the director at the time (Leon Vance) was on temporary leave following a family tragedy.

Germann has appeared infrequently in Law & Order: Special Victims Unit playing ADA Derek Strauss.

In 2016, Germann appeared in the ABC fantasy series drama Once Upon a Time portraying Hades, the God of the Underworld, for ten episodes. He was in the film Foster Boy.

He also appeared as neurosurgeon Tom Koracick in Grey's Anatomy.

== Personal life ==
His son with the actress Christine Mourad, Asa Germann, is also an actor.

== Filmography ==
=== Films ===
Year	Title	Role	Notes
1985	Streetwalkin'	Creepy	
1986	The Whoopee Boys	Tipper	
1989	Miss Firecracker	Ronnie Wayne	
1989	High Water	Waterman	Short film
1990	Child's Play 2	Mattson	
1991	Once Around	Jim Redstone	
1991	Big and Mean	unknown role	
1993	The Night We Never Met	Eddie	
1993	So I Married an Axe Murderer	Concierge	
1994	Clear and Present Danger	Petey	
1994	Imaginary Crimes	Attorney Drew	
1994	I.Q.	Billy Riley, Times Reporter	uncredited
1997	Culture	Tim Stevens	Short film
1998	Pete's Garden	Pete	Short film; also Director
1999	Jesus' Son	Dr. Shanis	
2000	The Last Producer	Rueben Tallridge	
2001	Sweet November	Vince Holland	
2001	Down to Earth	Sklar	
2001	Joe Somebody	Jeremy	
2004	Hair Show	unknown role	
2005	The Salon	unknown role	
2005	Bigger Than the Sky	Roger	
2005	Down and Derby	Phil Davis	
2005	The Sandlot 2	Mr. Goodfairer	Direct-to-Video
2005	Self Medicated	Keith	
2005	Crazylove	Dr. Emlee	
2005	Special Ed	David	
2005	Heart of the Beholder	Bob Harris	
2006	Friends with Money	Matt	
2006	Kill Your Darlings	Stevens	
2006	Talladega Nights: The Ballad of Ricky Bobby	Larry Dennit, Jr.	
2007	My Lunch with Larry	Larry	Short film
2008	Quarantine	Lawrence	
2008	Bolt	The Agent (voice role)	
2010	Group Sex	Reeves	Direct-to-DVD
2010	The Con Artist	Julien	
2011	Fly Away	Tom	
2011	Answers to Nothing	Mr. Beckworth	
2012	Mormons for President	unknown role	Short film
2012	Here Comes the Boom	Principal Betcher	
2014	Someone Marry Barry	Bill	
2014	The Little Rascals Save the Day	Ray "Big Ray" Kaye	Direct-to-Video
2014	Atlas Shrugged: Who Is John Galt?	James Taggart	
2015	Quitters	Roger	
2015	Get Hard	Peter Penny	
2016	Get a Job	Fernando the Accountant	
2016	Time Toys	Weller	
2017	Reinbou	Mr. Horton	
2017	Billy Boy	Mr. Langdon	
2018	Foster Boy	Simon Davis	
2023	57 Seconds	Sig Thorensen	

=== Television ===
Year	Title	Role	Notes
1985	ABC Afterschool Specials	Billy	Episode: "High School Narc"
1988	Tattinger's	unknown role	Episode: "Rest in Peas"
1989	Miami Vice	Johnny Raymond	Episode: "Freefall"
1989–1990	Tour of Duty	Lieutenant Beller	Recurring (4 episodes)
1990	H.E.L.P.	Lacy	Episode: "Fire Down Below"
1990	Equal Justice	Merkle	Episode: "Pilot"
1990	Against the Law	Fenstrom	Episode: "The Price of Life"
1991	Rewrite for Murder		Television Movie
1992	Yesterday Today	Dennis	Television Movie
1993	L.A. Law	Larry Greenhut	Episode: "Come Rain or Come Schein"
1993	Taking the Heat	Assistant District Attorney Kennedy	Television Movie
1993	Bakersfield P.D	Hood	Episode: "The Ex-Partner"
1994	Assault at West Point: The Court-Martial of Johnson Whittaker	Vernon Bailey	Television Movie
1994–1995	Sweet Justice	Andy Del Sarto	Series Regular (23 episodes)
1994–1996	Ellen	Rick	Recurring (3 episodes) – "The Anchor" (1994) – "The Class Reunion" (1994) – "The Mugging" (1996)
1995–1996	Ned and Stacey	Eric "Rico" Moyer	Series Regular (46 episodes)
1998	Remember WENN	Arden Sage	Episode: "Work Shift"
1997–2002	Ally McBeal	Richard Fish	Series Regular (112 episodes); Director of Episode: "Fear of Flirting"; Screen Actors Guild Award for Outstanding Performance by an Ensemble in a Comedy Series (1999); Nominated – Screen Actors Guild Award for Outstanding Performance by an Ensemble in a Comedy Series (2000, 2001)
1999	Jeopardy!	Himself (Celebrity Contestant)	Episode: "Television Personalities Night"
2002	The Twilight Zone	Ben Baker	Episode: "Sensuous Cindy"
2003	The Bernie Mac Show	Marcus	Episode: "Love Thy Nephew"
2003	The Snobs	Carl Mallard	
2004	Listen Up	Paul	2 Episodes
2005	Family Plan	Walcott	Television Movie
2006	Desperate Housewives	Jim Halverson	Episode: "We're Gonna Be All Right"
2006	Eureka	Professor Warren King	Episode: "Pilot"
2007	In Case of Emergency	Sherman Yablonsky	Series Regular (13 episodes)
2007	All I Want for Christmas	Roger Nelson	Television Movie
2009	Spectacular!	Mr. Romano	Television Movie
2009	CSI: Crime Scene Investigation	George	Episode: "The Descent of Man"
2009	The Cleaner	Ron Sayres	Episode: "Standing Eight"
2009	CSI: NY	Victor Benton	Episode: "Blacklist"
2009	Ghost Whisperer	Kirk Jansen	Episode: "Dead Listing"
2010	Medium	Dr. Alan Hahn	Episode: "Sal"
2010	The Santa Incident	Erickson	Television Movie
2010	Strange Brew		Television Movie
2010–2013	Raising Hope	Dale	Recurring (3 episodes) – "Meet the Grandparents" (2010) – "Killer Hope" (2011) – "Modern Wedding" (2013)
2011	Hawaii Five-0	Robert Rovin	Episode: "He Kane Hewa' Ole"
2011	Phineas and Ferb	Teenage boy #1, Additional voices (voice role)	Episode: "Make Play/Candace Gets Busted"
2011	Glenn Martin, DDS	Various (voice role)	Episode: "Windfall"
2011–2013	Aim High	Vice President Ockenhocker	Recurring (4 episodes)
2012	House of Lies	Greg Norbert	Recurring (6 episodes)
2012	Common Law	Phil Kronish	Episode: "The Ex-Factor"
2012	Drop Dead Diva	Judge Zahn	Episode: "Jane's Getting Married"
2012	I'm Not Dead Yet	Len	Television Movie
2012	Wedding Band	Larry Pants	Episode: "Get Down on It"
2012	The Unprofessional	Griffin	Television Movie
2013	NCIS	NCIS Deputy Director Jerome Craig	Recurring (3 episodes)
2013	The Gates	unknown role	Television Movie
2013–2026	Law & Order: Special Victims Unit	Assistant District Attorney Derek Strauss	Recurring (5 episodes)
2014	Blue Bloods	Dr. Michael Raskins	Episode: "Open Secrets"
2014	How to Get Away with Murder	Jared Keegan	Episode: "He Deserved to Die"
2014	HR	Markus Teal	Television Movie
2015	About a Boy	Johnny Idalis	2 episodes
2015	Chasing Life	William Conti	Recurring (3 episodes)
2015–2016	Limitless	ADIC Grady Johnson	2 episodes
2016	Once Upon a Time	Hades	Recurring (season 5 for 10 episodes); Nominated – Teen Choice Award for Choice TV: Villain
2017	Brooklyn Nine-Nine	Gary Lurmax	Episode: "Serve & Protect"
2017	Redliners	David Angola	Television Movie
2017	Friends from College	John	Recurring (5 episodes)
2017	Kevin Hart's Guide to Black History	Dr. Blalock	Television Movie
2017–2022; 2025	Grey's Anatomy	Dr. Tom (Thomas) Koracick	Recurring (Seasons 14–15); Main (Seasons 16–17) Guest (Seasons 18-19; 21); 56 episodes
2018	One Dollar	Wilson Furlbee	Recurring (6 episodes)
2020	Station 19	Dr. Tom Koracick	Episode: "Eulogy"
2020	Curb Your Enthusiasm	Dr. Andrew "Rusty" Holzer	Episode: "The Surprise Party"
2022	Firefly Lane	Benedict Binswanger	
2023-2026	Will Trent	James Ulster	Guest (4 episodes) – "Nothing Changed Except for Everything" – "A Bad Temper and a Hard Heart" – "Me Llamo Will Trent" – "It's the Work I Signed Up For"
2023	Hell's Kitchen	Himself	Blue guest diner and The People Concern contributor; Episode: "A Hellish Food Fight"
2026	Not Suitable for Work	David Teitelbaum	Recurring

=== Theatre ===
Year	Title	Role	Venue	Notes
1985–1986	Biloxi Blues	Arnold Epstein / Eugene Morris Jerome (replacements)	Neil Simon Theatre	
1990	Assassins	John Hinckley	Playwrights Horizons	
2008–2009	Boeing-Boeing	Bernard (replacement)	Longacre Theatre	117 performances
2016	Meteor Shower	Norm	Old Globe Theatre	

=== Director ===
Year	Title	Role	Notes
2001	Ally McBeal	Director	1 Episode Season 5. Episode 4 - Fear of Flirting
1998	Pete's Garden	Director	

=== Soundtrack ===
Year	Title	Media	Notes
1997 - 2001	Ally McBeal	TV Series	Performer: "Can't Keep a Good Man Down" Performer: "War" Performer: "More Today Than Yesterday" (uncredited)
