= 100 Women =

100 Women may refer to:

- 100 Women (film), a 2002 comedy film
- 100 Women (BBC), a set of awards and a multi-format series established in 2013 by the BBC
- 100 Women (OkayAfrica), a set of awards and events established in 2017 by US-based web site OkayAfrica
- 100 Women Who Changed the World, a list of 100 influential women published by the BBC in 2018
- 100 Women of the Year, a list of 100 influential women between 1920s-2010s published by Time magazine in 2020
