= Monster Man (film) =

- Theatrical release poster
- Directed by: Michael Davis
- Written by: Michael Davis
- Produced by: Yitzhak Ginsberg; Ehud Bleiberg; Larry Rattner
- Starring: Eric Jungmann; Justin Urich; Aimee Brooks; Michael Bailey Smith
- Cinematography: Matthew Irving
- Edited by: Kevin D. Ross
- Music by: John Coda
- Production company: Dream Entertainment
- Distributed by: Lions Gate Films
- Release dates: July 30, 2003 (München Fantasy Filmfest); October 12, 2004 (United States)
- Running time: 88 minutes
- Country: United States
- Language: English

Monster Man (released as Wrong Turn 2 in Latin America) is a 2003 American comedy horror film written and directed by Michael Davis. It stars Eric Jungmann, Justin Urich, Aimee Brooks, and Michael Bailey Smith.

== Plot ==
Adam (Eric Jungmann) and Harley (Justin Urich) drive a red 1970 Chevrolet Kingswood across the country so Adam can tell his ex-girlfriend Betty-Ann he still loves her before she gets married. After an encounter with a hearse, the two stop at a pub. They see a monster truck rally on TV, and Harley mocks the people watching it. As they drive away, a giant monster truck drives them off the road. Later on, they have to siphon gasoline from an abandoned RV. However, it is revealed that the RV has a mutilated body inside and is surrounded by truck tracks that form a pentagram. Adam sees the strange-looking driver, and Harley urinates in the cab of the monster truck before they speed away. At a hotel, Adam and Harley wake up with roadkill in their beds and find a hitchhiker named Sarah (Aimee Brooks) sleeping in the backseat when they get to the car. Sarah eventually has sex with Adam.

Later, they witness the monster truck run over a man and meet a man missing an arm who tells them the man in the monster truck takes people's limbs but lets the victims live. Afterwards, the three drive through a ghost town with many scarecrows. They find a diner at the end of the town and begin to eat, but Adam finds they are eating human flesh. They panic and run away. After being chased by the man in the monster truck, their car is destroyed. Adam, Harley, and Sarah run into the woods, and the man follows them. He eventually catches up with them, shoves Harley into a tree, supposedly killing him, and kidnaps Sarah.

Adam follows him to a shack covered with pentagrams, severed limbs, and a man whose entire middle section has been crushed. Adam finally finds Sarah and tries to escape, but Sarah knocks him unconscious. Sarah and the man, Bob (Michael Bailey Smith), are brother and sister. They tie Adam to a table while the "corpse" with the crushed midsection, Fred (Joe Goodrich), explains that Bob accidentally ran him over, crushing his midsection and sending Bob through the windshield after losing control & crashing into a tree. Sarah says she stitched Bob Up & used black magic to bring him & Fred back to life. Fred explains that they can use other people's limbs to add to their bodies as long as the donor stays alive, and they can only transfer entire bodies if the body is prepared correctly.

Sarah says they needed someone easy to prepare for, and Adam was the right person. Previous events begin to make sense to Adam. Everything that happened to Adam and Harley before was preparing Adam so that Fred could have his body: stepping into a pentagram with a mutilated body, sleeping with roadkill, Sarah having sex with him, eating human flesh & getting scared to death. Adam manages to escape and kills Sarah by slashing her throat. He also cuts Fred in half when he gets up and attacks him. Meanwhile, Bob locks the door & eats the key. But after a grueling fight, Adam retrieves the key and escapes.

Outside, Bob follows Adam but is run over by Harley's monster truck. Harley remarks he was playing dead and apologizes to Adam for everything he did to him since the film's beginning. He offers Adam the chance to drive Bob's monster truck, to which Adam ecstatically agrees. Adam then runs over Bob with the monster truck repeatedly for hours. In the end, Adam thanks Harley for his help and the whole trip, calling him a good friend. When Harley mentions finishing the trip to Betty-Ann's wedding, Adam gives up on getting Betty-Ann to fall in love with him, and with that, Harley then decides to "pick up some poontang" with Adam, and they drive away. But as they leave, Bob's crushed corpse taunts the duo, all while repeating the phrase, "You Can't Kill Me !".

After this, "The End?" pops up on the screen, followed by a still-alive Fred complaining he isn't dead and didn't get to have sex with his sister.

== Cast ==
- Eric Jungmann as Adam
- Justin Urich as Harley
- Aimee Brooks as Sarah
- Michael Bailey Smith as Monster Man/Brother Bob
- Joe Goodrich as Brother Fred

== Production ==
The title of Monster Man was created by producers Yitzhak Ginsberg and Ehud Bleiberg and was pre-sold to foreign markets without a writer or director attached. Ginsberg and Bleiberg contacted Michael Davis after collaborating with him on 100 Girls and 100 Women. Davis was looking to break away from the romantic comedy genre and pitched a horror comedy, influenced by The Evil Dead and Duel, about a monster who drives a monster truck.

== Release ==
Monster Man debuted at the München Fantasy Filmfest on July 30, 2003. The film was officially released on DVD by Lions Gate Home Entertainment on October 12, 2004.

== Reception ==
Monster Man received mixed reviews from critics upon its release. It currently has a 40% rating on Rotten Tomatoes Kim Newman from Empire Magazine awarded the film 3 out of 3 stars, writing, "Derivative of everything from Duel to Jeepers Creepers, this is good, trashy horror fun with a streak of Jackass-style grossness, some leftfield surprises and the always-reliable sense that the middle of America is a sucking pit of desperation that's out to get you." Arrow in the Head rated the film a score of 7/10, commending the film's cinematography, slick direction, and humor. The site concluded their review by writing, "With its strong dose of 'out of line' comedy, sometimes at the genre’s expense, and its extreme display of gory goods, Monster Man had me having a blast in my seat most of the time."

Time Out gave the film a negative review, writing, "Sporadically funny it may be, but it’s also stereotypical, clichéd, amateurish, stupid and often quite sick." Johnny Butane of Dread Central rated the film a score of 0.5 out of 5, stating that the film was neither funny or scary, also criticizing the film's annoying characters.

== Unmade sequels ==
Come 2005, Dream Entertainment was pursuing two sequels to Monster Man. Leatherface: Texas Chainsaw Massacre III filmmaker Jeff Burr was tapped to direct both films back-to-back, working from a script by himself and Brian Muir. Monster Man 2 planned to follow reality television producers searching for Brother Bob, while Monster Man 3 was to showcase a traveling circus ran by a witch, and would have fused Bob and his monster truck together as one.
