= Past, Present, and Future (NCIS) =

- NCIS episode
- Episode no.: Season 11; Episode 2
- Directed by: James Whitmore, Jr.
- Written by: Gary Glasberg, Scott Williams and Gina Lucita Monreal
- Original air date: October 1, 2013

Guest appearances
- Joe Spano as Senior FBI Agent Tobias C. Fornell; Leslie Hope as SecNav Sarah Porter; Marina Sirtis as Orli Elbaz; Allan Louis as Navy Captain Dominick Wayne; Damon Dayoub as Adam Eshel; Costas Mandylor as Tomás Méndez; Lena Georgas as Doctor Deena Bashan; Omar J. Dorsey as Vernon Dale; Solomon Shiv as Officer #1; Keenan Henson as Henry Coldwell; Nell Teare as Young Woman; Brenda Vivian as Waitress; Gabi Coccio as 13-year-old Ziva David

Episode chronology
← Previous "Whiskey Tango Foxtrot"	Next → "Under the Radar"
- NCIS season 11

"Past, Present, and Future" is the second episode of the eleventh season of the American police procedural drama NCIS, and the 236th episode overall. It originally aired on CBS in the United States on October 1, 2013. The episode is written by Gary Glasberg, Scott Williams and Gina Lucita Monreal and directed by James Whitmore, Jr., and was seen by 19.98 million viewers.

== Plot ==
Gibbs and the team continue the hunt for Parsa and his growing terrorist ring while Tony heads to Israel to track down Ziva. Tony does eventually manage to track down Ziva, but Ziva reveals that after the death of her father, she no longer wants to live the life of an agent and therefore has decided to cut off all ties to her previous life, including NCIS and Tony. Tony is heartbroken at this, as he realizes his romantic feelings for Ziva and tries to convince her to return. However, Ziva's mind is made up. Tony tells Ziva to at least call Gibbs, as he is a "good listener"; Ziva tells Tony that he's "so loved" and they kiss before he returns to the United States.

Meanwhile, Gibbs continues to try to track down Parsa and the men responsible for the bombing that killed SECNAV Clayton Jarvis. They discover that Tomás Mendez, the member of an anti-terrorist business organization, is a potential target, and Fornell is assigned to be his bodyguard. However, Abby and McGee analyze the bomb parts and manage to trace them to corporations owned by Mendez. Gibbs realizes that Mendez is one of the businessmen in league with Parsa. The show then returns to the scene depicted in a scene from season 10 finale's "Damned If You Do", in which Gibbs commandeers a 7.62mm Blaser 93 sniper rifle. He shoots and kills Mendez before he can set off another bomb, the bullet passing through Fornell's buttocks as well.

Afterwards, all charges against Gibbs are dropped, and Tony and McGee are reinstated as NCIS agents. Meanwhile, at home, Gibbs receives a phone call from Ziva.

== Production ==
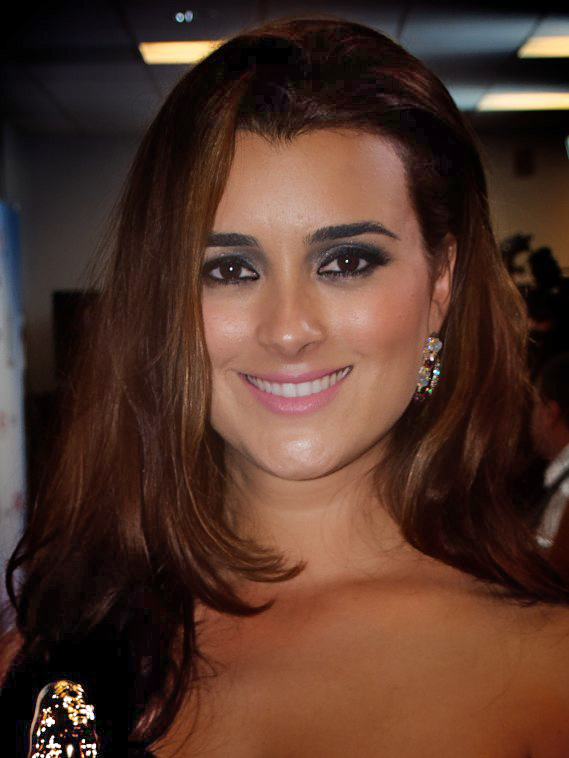
Cote de Pablo's character Ziva David left NCIS as a regular in the episode.

"Past, Present, and Future" was written by Gary Glasberg, Scott Williams and Gina Lucita Monreal and directed by James Whitmore, Jr. Following de Pablo's announced departure from NCIS, the episode was "really all about Tony and Ziva". "We learn why she’s going to make the decision she’s going to make", executive producer Gary Glasberg said before the episode aired. The writers "put a lot into [Ziva's] storyline" and wanted it to be a "really passionate, lovely goodbye" for the character, even though "Ziva has always been a mystery, and she remains a mystery".

Although it was a two-part storyline, Ziva was absent from the premiere episode "Whiskey Tango Foxtrot". According to Glasberg it was because "I couldn't do it [all] in one episode". The season 10 finale "Damned If You Do" had its own storyline, which Glasberg "wove" into Ziva's exit.

The writers wanted to do a different story for Ziva's exit. Sasha Alexander's character Kate Todd was killed in the second-season finale "Twilight", and Glasberg said "it’s not what this character deserves". He also said that Ziva's departure "[is] a storyline that I took very, very seriously — I felt like I had to, for the fans. I recognize what this means to them, and I recognize what her absence is going to mean."

== Departure of de Pablo ==
Cote de Pablo announced her departure from the show on July 10, 2013, and said "I’ve had 8 great years with NCIS and Ziva David [and] look forward to finishing Ziva’s story". About the exit from NCIS, de Pablo said that "I left under my terms, and that was wonderful". In her last episode Ziva is only shown together with Tony, which also was the first character Ziva met in "Kill Ari". "My first scene ever in the bullpen was with Michael, and my goodbye scene was with Michael. I feel like that was a beautiful way of ending — for now, certainly — a beautiful chapter between these two".

Gary Glasberg wrote a letter to the fans, and started with "That was quite a summer, [...] I did not plan on the departure of Ziva David". When it was announced, Glasberg had to change the story and start "making this work and handling the situation with the utmost care and delicacy". "It’s okay to be sad. But, then, don’t forget what we’re good at", he continued.

== Reception ==
=== Ratings ===
"Past, Present, and Future" was seen by 19.98 million live viewers following its broadcast on October 1, 2013, with a 3.5/11 share among adults aged 18 to 49. A rating point represents one percent of the total number of television sets in American households, and a share means the percentage of television sets in use tuned to the program. In total viewers, "Past, Present, and Future" easily won NCIS and CBS the night. Compared to the last episode "Whiskey Tango Foxtrot", "Past, Present, and Future" was down in viewers and adults 18–49.

=== Critical reviews ===
The episode received mixed reviews. Douglas Wolfe from TV Fanatic gave the episode 5/5 and stated that "The way they ended it seemed believable and sad, given the fact that this was Cote de Pablo's final episode with NCIS". Joyce Eng and Kate Stanhope from TV Guide named it the week's "Most Underwhelming Exit", saying, "On NCIS, Tony tracks down an MIA Ziva -- who's on a soul-searching trip to her native Israel -- based on a dream he had (yeah, we know) and tries in vain to convince her to return with him to D.C. Instead, they say goodbye on an airplane runway, where Ziva tells Tony, 'You are so loved,' and they finally kiss. 'Hardest 180 of my life,' he says, as he walks to board the plane. Um, that's it? Listen, we know Cote de Pablo's decision to leave the show was a surprise, but Ziva fans deserve a bit more than a few meaningful glances, a brief kiss and a handful of short Ziva scenes over two episodes."
