= Tumble Bug =

Amusement ride with a circular track

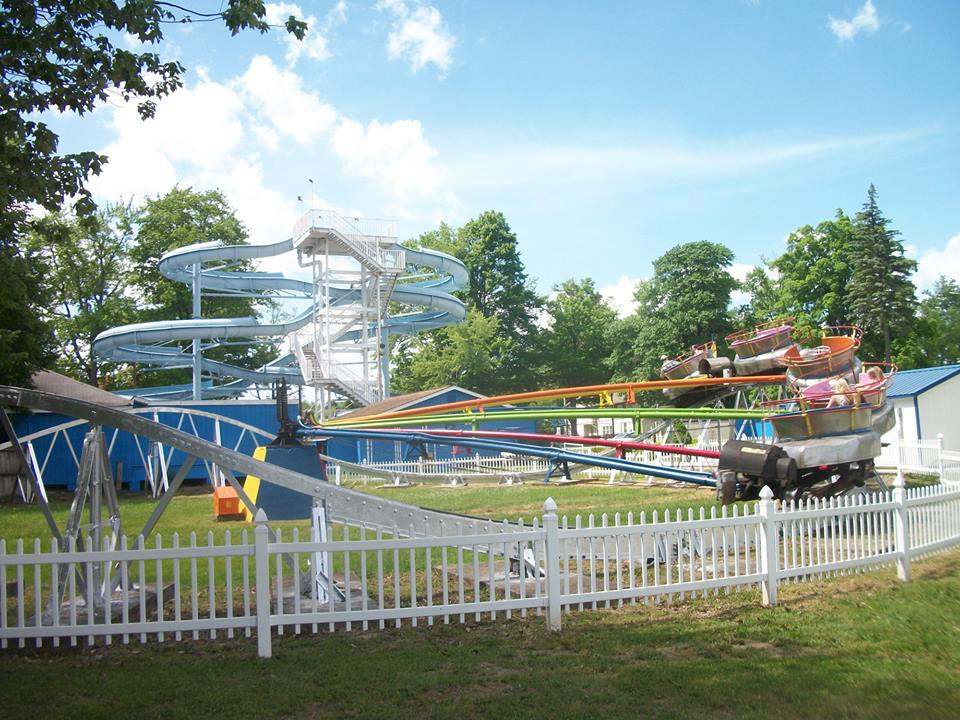
Conneaut Lake Park's Tumble Bug

A Tumble Bug is an amusement park ride with a circular track.

The ride has a central axis and a circular track. The track has changes in elevation in it, and the cars, each attached by a rod to a central pivotal attachment point and connected to one another, are propelled around the track via motors between the cars. Power is carried to the motors via slip ring brushes at the center and cables.

Only one full-sized Tumble Bug remains in operation today at Kennywood in West Mifflin, Pennsylvania. There are multiple kiddie versions of the ride still in operation. All full-size instances were made by Traver Engineering, and its successor, R.E.Chambers. The ride also exists in a miniature children's form. A full-sized Tumble Bug is 100 feet in diameter, and operates with five or six cars, while the kiddie version has three or four cars.

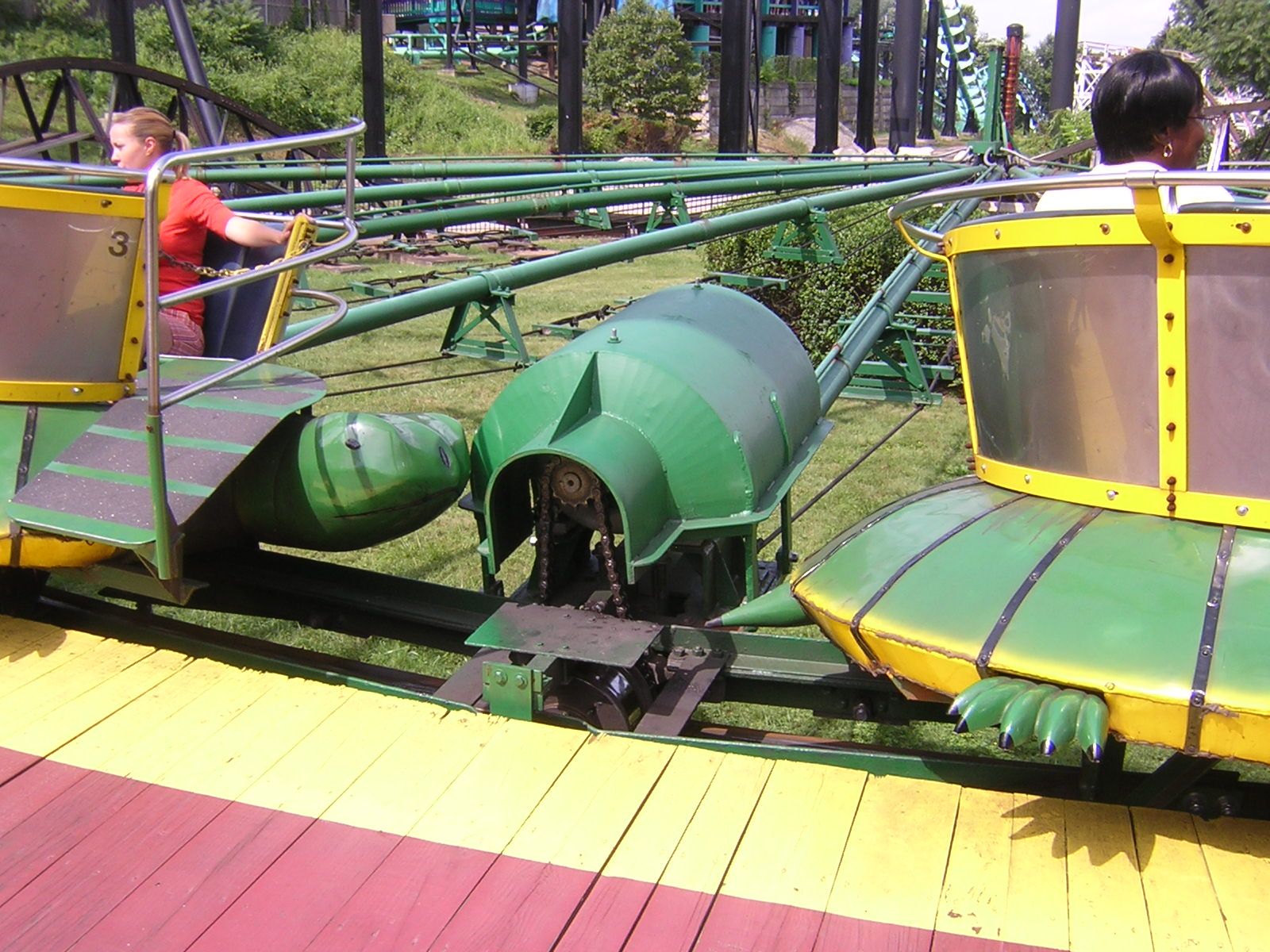
Drive details of Kennywood's "Turtle"

== Tumble Bug sites ==
=== Operating ===
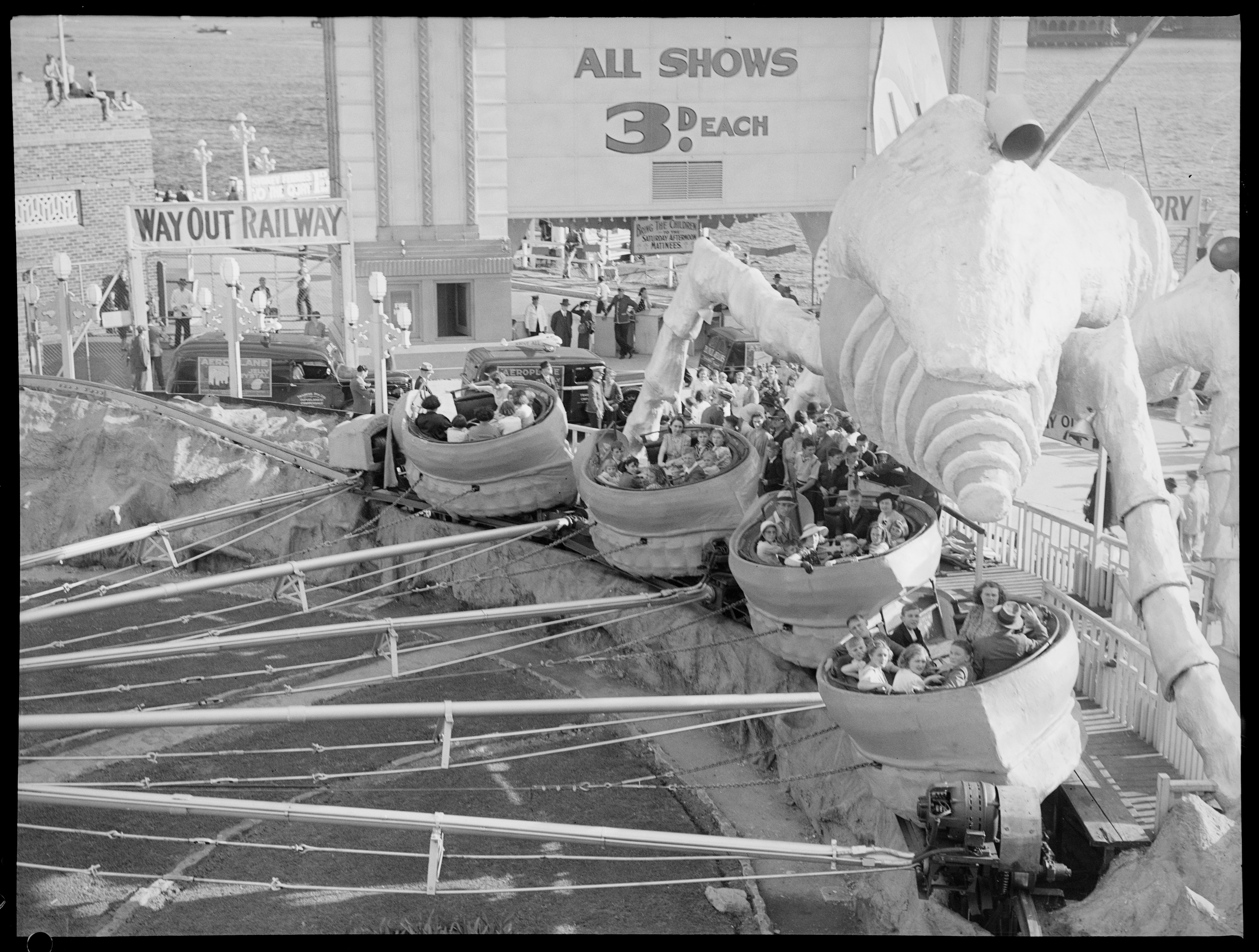
Luna Park Sydney's Tumble Bug

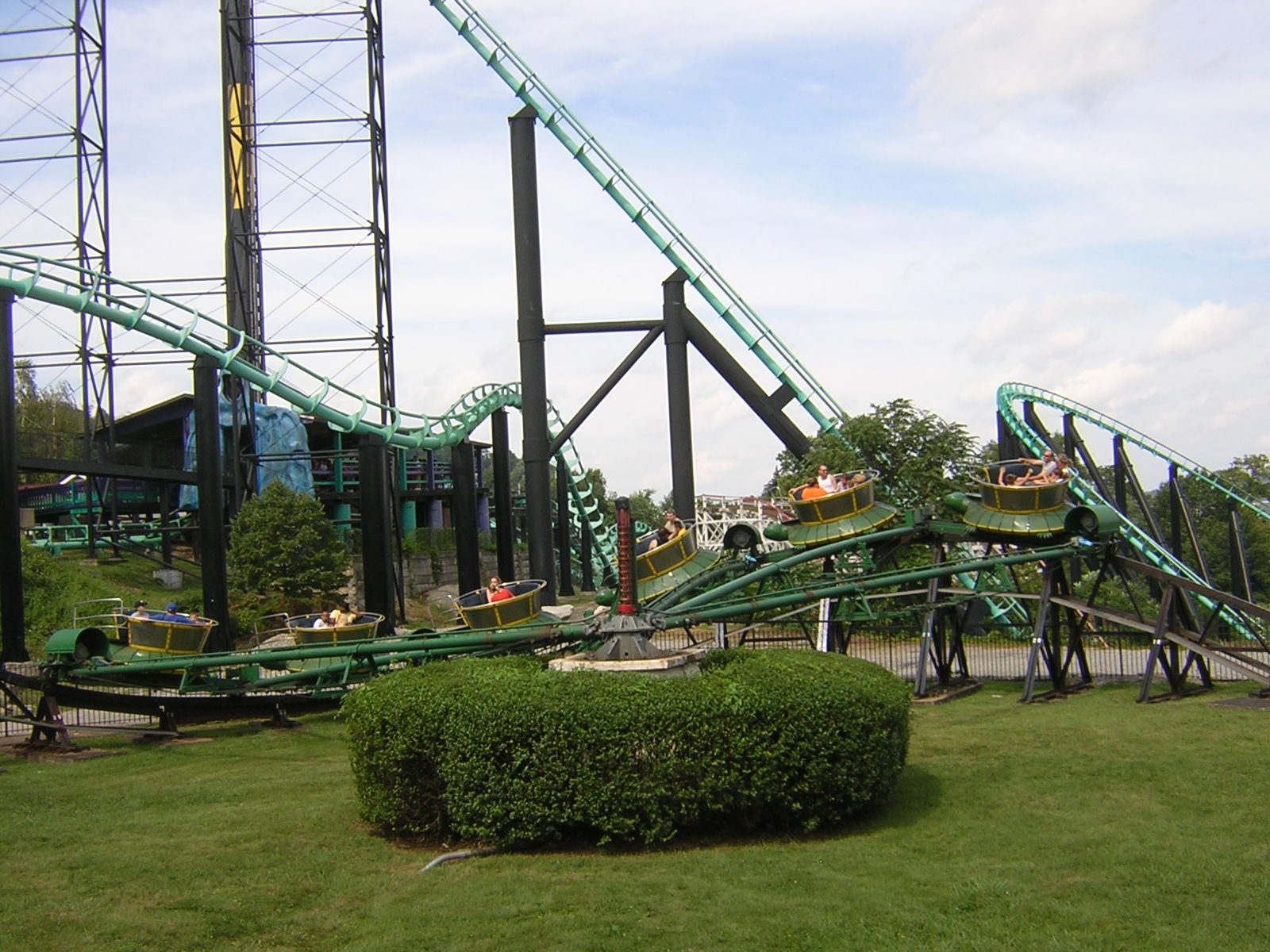
Kennywood's "Turtle"

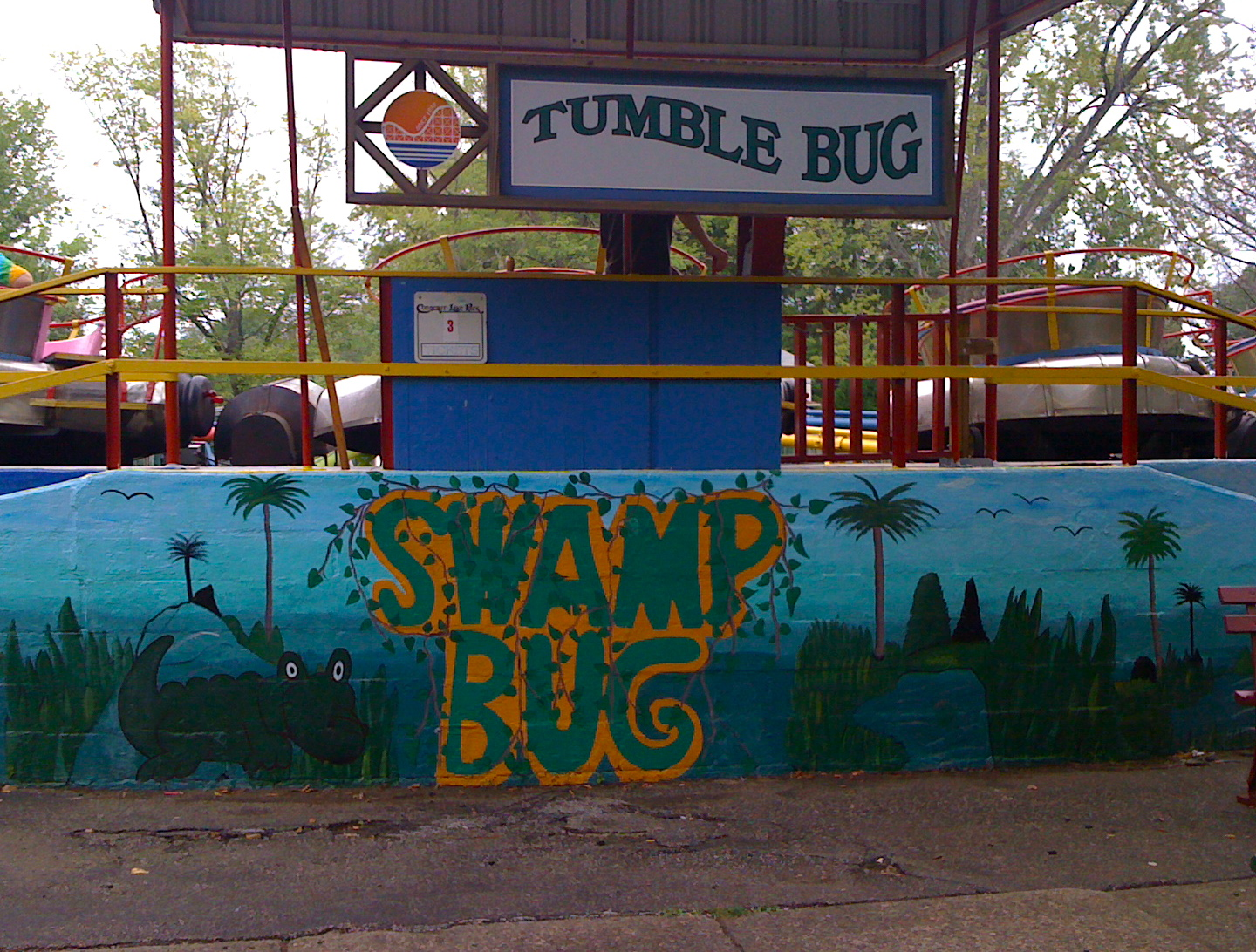
Theming on Conneaut Lake Park's Tumble Bug

- Kennywood (1927–present), West Mifflin, Pennsylvania, (known as "Turtle", 6 car model)

=== Defunct ===
- Cascade Park (1969–N/A), New Castle, Pennsylvania
- Cedar Point (1934–1963), Sandusky, Ohio
- Chippewa Lake Park (N/A–1978), Chippewa Lake, Ohio
- Conneaut Lake Park (1925–2019) Conneaut Lake, Pennsylvania, (also known as "Swamp Bug", 5 car model)
- Crescent Park (1930s–1979), Riverside, Rhode Island
- Euclid Beach Park (N/A–1969), Cleveland, Ohio
- Geauga Lake (N/A–1977), Aurora, Ohio
- Hersheypark, (1933–1981), Hershey, Pennsylvania, (known as "The Bug") (ride tubs sold to Whalom Park)
- Idora Park (1941–1984), Youngstown, Ohio, (known as "Turtle", 5 car model)
- Luna Park Sydney (1935-c.1975), Milsons Point, New South Wales
- Coney Island (1925–1971) / Kings Island (1972–1985), Mason, Ohio (sold to Kennywood to use as spare parts for their Tumble Bug)
- Olentangy Park (1929–1937), Columbus, Ohio
- Pleasure Beach Resort (1935–2004), Blackpool, England (known as Turtle Chase)
- San Souci Park, Hanover Township, Luzerne County, Pennsylvania
- Seabreeze Amusement Park (1926–1970), Rochester, New York
- Waldameer & Water World (1944–late 1950s), Erie, Pennsylvania
- West View Park (1929–1977), West View, Pennsylvania
- Whalom Park (N/A–2000), Lunenburg, Massachusetts, (sold to Edaville Family Theme Park in Carver, Massachusetts in the mid-2000s, but never operated there, and was eventually sold for scrap metal in 2010)
