= Aimee Brooks =

American actress

- Occupation: Actress
- Years active: 1986–2010

Aimee Brooks is an American former actress. She is mostly known for her roles in horror movies, including the lead protagonist in Critters 3. Her most recent film is Closed for the Season in 2010. Brooks also appeared in the television series Valerie, Blossom, Eerie, Indiana, Brooklyn Bridge, Criminal Minds, Shark and was a series regular in the sitcom Muddling Through.

== Filmography ==
=== Film ===
Year	Title	Role	Notes
1986	Sorority House Massacre	Cathy	
1988	Kids Have Rights Too!	Brenda Billings	Video short
1989	The Princess and the Dwarf		
1990	The End of Innocence		
1991	Critters 3	Annie	
1995	Open Season	Clinique	
1995	True Crime	Margie Donlevy	Video
2003	Monster Man	Sarah	
2004	The Hillside Strangler	Felicia Waller	
2005	The Mangler Reborn	Jamie	Video
2010	Closed for the Season	Kristy	

=== Television ===
Year	Title	Role	Notes
1987	The Hogan Family	Janice	"Take My Wife, Please"
1988	Moving Target	Jody Kellogg	TV film
1988	A Place at the Table	Older girl	TV film
1989	Saved by the Bell	Buffy	"The Zack Tapes"
1990–91	Days of Our Lives	Sarah Horton	TV series
1991	Blossom	Adrian	"I Ain't Got No Buddy"
1991	Eerie, Indiana	Young Mary	"The Dead Letter"
1992	Brooklyn Bridge	Melinda Dean	"Brave New World"
1992	Great Scott!	Nikki	"Hair Scare"
1993	Shaky Ground	Waitress	"Sudden Impact"
1994	Muddling Through	Kerri Drego	Main role
1995	Vanishing Son	Jeanna Garbett	"Sweet Sixteen"
2001	Port Charles	Samantha Norris	TV series
2004	Strong Medicine		"Prophylactic Measures"
2004	Arnold Schwarzenegger: A VH1 Popumentary	Barbara Baker	TV film
2004	Complete Savages	Sheila	"Almost Men in Uniform"
2005	Criminal Minds	Housewife	"Won't Get Fooled Again"
2006	Shark	Amber Sellers	"Dr. Feelbad", "Love Triangle"
