= Chippewa Lake Park =

Former amusement park in Ohio, US

- Previously known as Andrew's Pleasure Grounds
- Interactive map of Chippewa Lake Park
- Location: Chippewa Lake, Ohio, United States
- Coordinates: 41°3′49.0″N 81°54′6.2″W
- Status: Defunct
- Opened: 1878
- Closed: 1978
- Owner: Edward Andrews (1878-1898); Mac Beach (1898-1937); Parker Beach (1937-1969); Continental Business Enterprises (1969-1978)

Attractions
- Roller coasters: 3

Chippewa Lake Park is an abandoned amusement park located in Chippewa Lake, Ohio, Medina County. It operated from 1878 through 1978, after the final owner, Continental Business Enterprises closed it due to a lack of attendance. The rides and structures were left largely untouched and unmaintained for over 45 years.

== History ==
=== Andrew's Pleasure Grounds: 1878–1898 ===
In 1878, Edward Andrews organized a picnic ground and beach under the name Andrew's Pleasure Grounds. The park operated with some success, but its condition deteriorated. With the addition of a steamboat and the park's first roller coaster, the amusement park was brought to life. The initial roller coaster had to be manually pushed up the track following each ride.

=== Chippewa Lake Park: 1898–1969 ===
Mac Beach acquired Chippewa Lake in 1898 and improved the park immensely. He also placed a ban on liquor sales. His son, Parker, managed the park during its boom years: The Roaring '20s. During that decade, the first modern roller coaster was built at the park, designed by Fred Pearce. Originally named the Big Dipper, it became better known as simply "the roller coaster". The park also featured a live band-stand seven nights a week. The park opened the wooden roller coaster in 1925. It was a fairly small one, estimated to be about 50 Feet high. It operated until the park closed in 1978. It stood abandoned for over 30 years until it was demolished in 2010. The Beach family kept the park running successfully into the 1960s. Eventually, it would feature three roller coasters, flying cages, a Ferris wheel, a carousel, a Tumble Bug, a ballroom, and many other rides.

=== Resale and closure: 1969–1978 ===
Chippewa Lake was acquired by Continental Business Enterprises in 1969, and the company developed plans to transform the park into more of a summer resort. These plans drew very little public interest and funding so most were scrapped. The park closed in 1978 - its centennial season - under the company's ownership, owing to factors like competition from nearby Cedar Point and the now defunct Geauga Lake, as well as the decline of steel and rubber production in the surrounding areas. It was largely unknown to the public that the park's centennial season would be its last; it closed rather secretly without any big media coverage or massive public outcry.

=== Abandonment and deterioration: 1978–2008 ===
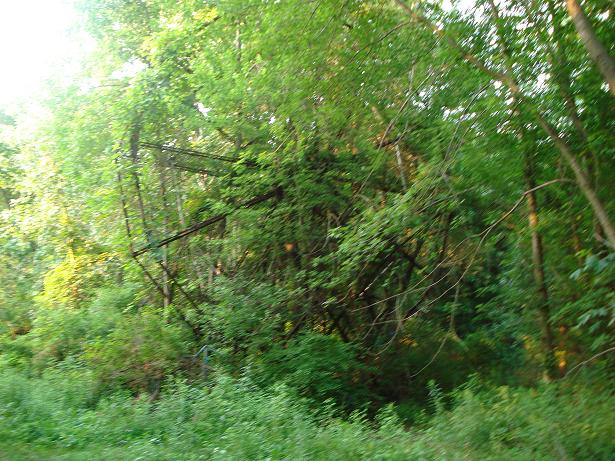
The Ferris Wheel in 2007, left standing like many rides, but overgrown with foliage

After the park's closure in 1978, the land it was situated on was left largely untouched and all of the rides and buildings were left standing, in which up until the end of the 1990s the park remained in fairly good condition and some of the rides were still usable. By the 2000s, large trees began growing through rides like the roller coaster and Ferris Wheel, and several buildings had collapsed or been damaged by the effects of the elements. All the park's structures rusted and rotted beyond repair.

List of rides and attractions:

- Big Dipper
- Ferris Wheel
- Miniature Railroad
- Carousel
- Fun House
- Tumble Bug
- Dodgem
- Little Dipper
- Himalaya
- Flying Cages
- Caterpillar
- Flying Scooters
- Octopus
- Tilt A Whirl
- Rocket Ship
- Wild Mouse
- Former Grand Trunk Western caboose

At approximately 4pm on June 13, 2002, the ballroom burned down.

By 2008, several other buildings had suffered the ballroom's fate, including the hotel, arcade, Fun House, peanut stand, and maintenance building, all of which had been damaged or destroyed by fire. Other rides and structures still stood, in various states of disrepair. These included the roller coaster, the Wild Mouse, the Little Dipper, the Tumble Bug, and the frames of the Ferris Wheel and Flying Cages. Most other buildings across the park were in various states of collapse due to 30 years of neglect by this time.

In 2008, 30 years after the park's closure, the land it stood on was offered up for sale with an asking price of $3.5 million, and, according to the realtor's website, was sold. The page which indicated this was last updated on March 26, 2008.

The 2007 documentary film "Welcome Back Riders" featured Chippewa Lake Park.

The horror film Closed For the Season, shot in 2008 and released in 2010, had several scenes shot at the park, and featured many of its derelict attractions as backgrounds.

=== Demolition: 2009–2010 ===
On September 9, 2008, Chippewa Partners LLC announced plans for a development on the site called "Chippewa Landing" which was planned to include a hotel and spa, fitness center, restaurants, a conference and music center, small shops, and other entertainment venues, that was expected to be completed sometime in 2010.

The site's structures, trees, and debris were being demolished and removed as of April 5, 2009, and the site was expected to be redeveloped after the completion of the work. Tours of the property were available in spring 2009, on Saturdays between 11am and 5pm. Afterward, tours were only held on the second Saturday of every month (June 13 and July 11), between 11am and 5pm.

As of June 14, 2010, the hamburger stand (Stand A) and half of the Big Dipper have been demolished.

As of June 19, 2010, the date of the final "tour" of the property, the hamburger stand and Big Dipper are gone.

=== 2012 and beyond ===
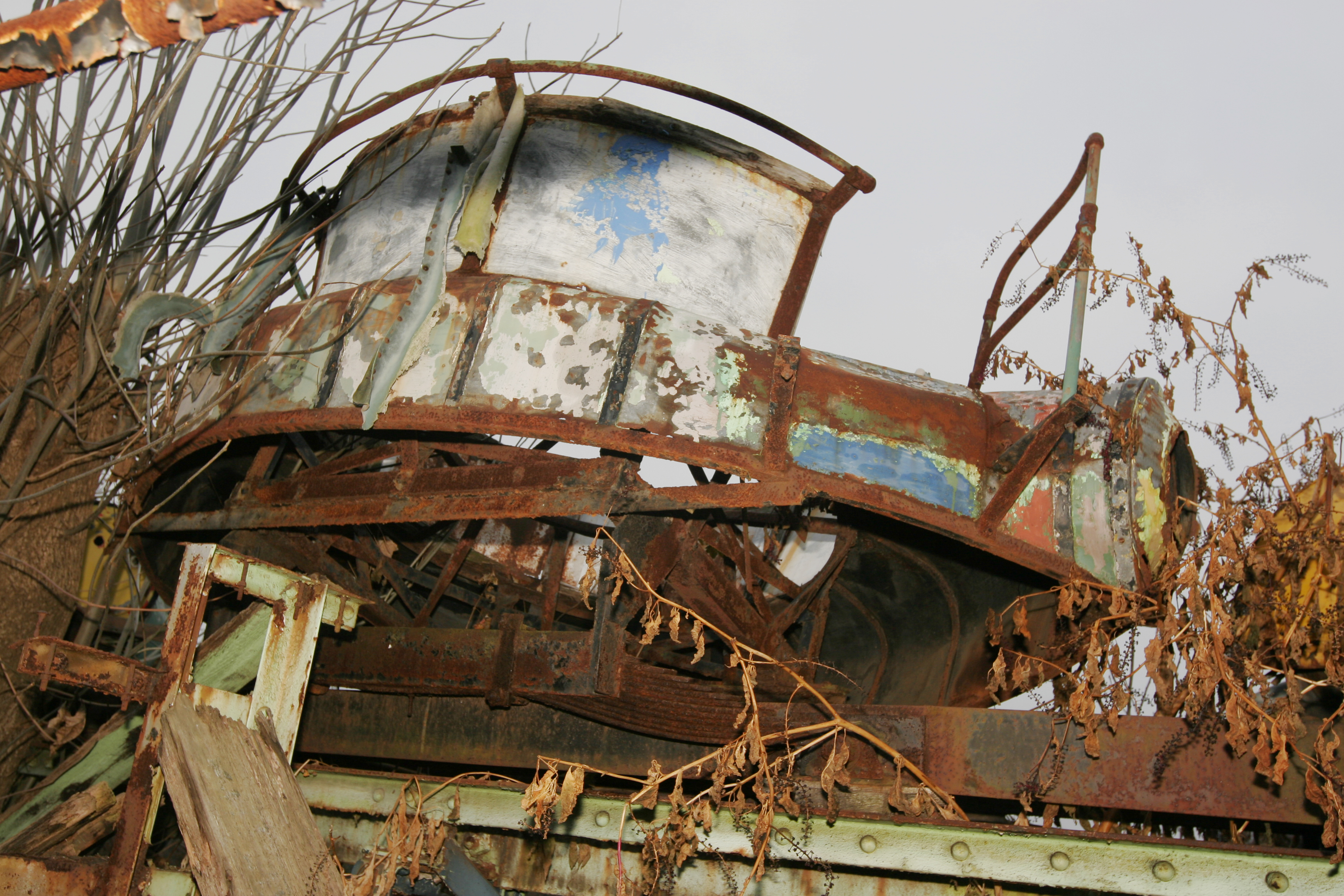
Chippewa Lake Park's Tumble Bug in November 2010, after property demolition was stopped

As of April 18, 2012, the Chippewa Partners LLC's aforementioned plans for the site have been scrapped due to a lawsuit, and the property went into foreclosure.

As of August 2012, an attempt to auction off the property failed and foliage is starting to reclaim the park again.

As of spring 2013, the Wild Mouse has been taken down.

In October 2013, an organization called Flying Cages stated their intention to attract investors to contribute to making the site an outdoor entertainment venue. The possibility exists that a few of the surviving rides might be preserved as icons of the past.

In October 2015, the current owners of the property listed it for sale for $3.7 million.

As of May 3, 2017, the property is still listed for sale.

On December 6, 2017, the Tom Sawyer steamboat was removed from the park and trucked down to Tennessee for restoration to operation. It was purchased by Jason Carver of J Beez Watercraft in 2009.

In 2020, it was announced that the park will be reborn as a Medina County park, which owns the adjacent 340-acre Chippewa Lake. The plan was to salvage what is left of the park, and use signage to detail the rich history of the area.

As of June 2024, the Ferris Wheel, the Little Dipper, the Flying Cages, and the Tumble Bug are still standing, along with sections of the train track and the remains of the ballroom and other structures. The Tumble Bug cars were removed and set aside, including one outside the fence, along with the gear lift mechanism to the roller coaster and some barrels.

As of late 2024, the former sign at the main entrance was removed as well as the old ticket booths and part of the fence where they once stood.

As of August 2025, the former Chippewa Lake Amusement Park is being transformed into a public park by the Medina County Park District (MCPD), with the first phase of public access opening in spring 2026.

In May 2026, The Medina County Park District opened the Tumble Bug Trailhead.
