= Closed for the Season (film) =

- Directed by: Jay Woelfel
- Written by: Jay Woelfel
- Produced by: Jay Ellison; Jon D. Wagner
- Starring: Damian Maffei; Aimee Brooks; Joe Unger; Nick Baldasare
- Cinematography: Jose Cardenas; Jay Ellison
- Edited by: Jay Ellison; Jay Woelfel
- Music by: Jay Woelfel
- Production companies: The Lenz Films; Shadowcast Pictures
- Distributed by: Velocity Home Entertainment
- Release date: March 13, 2010
- Running time: 111 minutes
- Country: United States
- Language: English

Closed for the Season is a 2010 supernatural thriller film written and directed by Jay Woelfel, starring Aimee Brooks, Damian Maffei, Joe Unger, and Nick Baldasare.

== Plot ==
The film tells the story of Kristy who, wakes up to find herself trapped beneath the ruins of a dilapidated wooden roller coaster inside an abandoned amusement park. She quickly finds herself being terrorized by the myths and urban legends that have become part of Chippewa Lake’s 130-year history. While attempting to escape, Kristy runs into James, whose parents are the caretakers of the park. James listens to Kristy and helps her investigate. James discovers that he, too, is now trapped inside the park. Kristy and James encounter a mysterious carny in clown makeup, who once was responsible for operating the amusement park’s roller coaster but who died many years previously. He advises the couple that their only escape is to relive and survive all the life-threatening tales from the park’s past and to ride the now-operational rides in the park one final time.

== Production ==
The film was written and directed by Jay Woelfel, and produced by ShadowCast Pictures; Jay Ellison and Jon Wagner worked as executive producers. It was shot in Chippewa Lake, Ohio and Los Angeles, California. The film is based upon folklore surrounding an amusement park in Chippewa Lake, Ohio. Many of the film's scenes were shot on the site of the long-closed amusement park, using some of the derelict attractions as backgrounds.

== Release ==
The film premiered on March 12, 2010 at the Monster-Mania 14 and is part of the Famous Monster Convention.
