= Michael Davis (director) =

American film director & screenwriter (born 1961)

- Born: August 1, 1961 (age 64); Rockville, Maryland, U.S.
- Occupations: Producer, Film director, Writer

Michael Davis (born August 1, 1961) is an American film director and screenwriter born in Rockville, Maryland.

His films include the campy horror film Monster Man and action film Shoot 'Em Up starring Clive Owen, Paul Giamatti, and Monica Bellucci.

== Filmography ==
Year	Title	Director	Writer	Notes
1993	Prehysteria!	No	Yes	
1994	Double Dragon	No	Yes	
1994	Prehysteria! 2	No	Yes	Direct-to-video
1994	Pet Shop	No	Yes	
1994	Beanstalk	Yes	Yes	Directorial debut
1995	Prehysteria! 3	No	Yes	Direct-to-video
1998	Eight Days a Week	Yes	Yes	Also producer
1999	The Incredible Genie	No	Yes	
2000	100 Girls	Yes	Yes	
2002	100 Women	Yes	Yes	Also animator (Sam's film)
2003	Monster Man	Yes	Yes	
2007	Shoot 'Em Up	Yes	Yes	
2013	Riding Shotgun	Yes	Yes	Short

As executive producer

- ENTV Minute (2012, 22 episodes)
- The Lord of the Sands of Time (TBA)

As storyboard artist

- The Revenge of Al Capone (1989, TV Movie)
- Night Game (1989)
- The Cellar (1989)
- Tremors (1990)
- Teenage Mutant Ninja Turtles II: The Secret of the Ooze (1991)
- Encino Man (1992)
- Live Wire (1992)
