= Under the Radar (NCIS) =

- NCIS episode
- Episode no.: Season 11; Episode 3
- Directed by: Dennis Smith
- Written by: George Schenck and Frank Cardea
- Original air date: October 8, 2013

Guest appearances
- Roma Maffia as NCIS Special Agent Vera Strickland; Wade Williams as Larry Purcell; Teri Reeves as Navy LTJG Dana Robbins; Barbara Eve Harris as FAA Director Stacy Bergin; Wolé Parks as Navy Captain Michael Laramie; Robert Newman as Navy Vice Admiral Wayne Hargrove; Scott Waara as Mel Frazier; Jonathan Patrick Moore as Kip Logan; Will Harris as Murray Hines; Lou George as Manager; Andrea Bordeaux as Courtney; Hugo Armstrong as NCIS Special Agent Eugene Coyle; Tyler Wolfe as Navy LTJG Terence Keith; Christian Cehring as Metro Police Officer Owen Tamblin

Episode chronology
← Previous "Past, Present, and Future"	Next → "Anonymous Was a Woman"
- NCIS season 11

"Under the Radar" is the third episode of the eleventh season of the American police procedural drama NCIS, and the 237th episode overall. It originally aired on CBS in the United States on October 8, 2013. The episode is written by George Schenck and Frank Cardea and directed by Dennis Smith, and was seen by 18.33 million viewers.

== Plot ==
When an apartment landlord attempts to open a door to deliver mail, he is killed by a bomb wired to the door. Since the apartment belongs to a Navy lieutenant, Gibbs and his team are called in. However, they find that the Navy lieutenant, Terence Keith, is missing after taking leave. Further investigation reveals that Keith had wanted to be a fighter pilot but washed out of flight training. He had also purchased over 200 pounds of C4 explosive and rented a STOL plane. The team deduces that he is planning to use the explosives and the plane to bomb a target. However, because the STOL can fly below radar coverage, it would be next to impossible to find. McGee comes up with the idea to use Twitter to find the plane by asking Twitter users to send a tweet if they see it fly overhead. Using the data they collect, the team figures out that Keith is planning to bomb the U.S.S. Benjamin Franklin, an aircraft carrier that is also carrying several of Keith's classmates who graduated from flight training and that Keith is attacking it, purely because one of his classmates, Lieutenant Junior Grade Dana Robbins is on board which Gibbs realizes is the ultimate blow to Keith's ego as Robbins gets to fly airplanes and Keith doesn't. Gibbs manages to contact Keith and tells him his plan is doomed to fail, as the carrier has scrambled fighters and its anti-air defenses have locked onto him. Gibbs even attempts to encourage Keith to surrender, stating that Keith will be given safe passage to do so. Keith turns the plane away, but since he is holding a dead man switch and has nothing left to live for, remarks that it's too late before he commits suicide by detonating the bomb, destroying the aircraft and killing himself in the process.

There are two other side plots in the episode: Agent Strickland and McGee losing his NCIS ID. Agent Strickland, Mike Franks' last partner, temporarily joins the team while she is waiting to retire in two weeks. However, she is allowed to retire early after she gets injured in the field with this causing her to develop a strong grudge against DiNozzo. Meanwhile, McGee loses his ID and tries to find it, knowing that he would face severe punishment if the loss is found out. He admits this to Gibbs, and later Vance gives him his ID, saying it was found at RFK Stadium where McGee had gone earlier. McGee manages to escape punishment, however, due to his idea to use Twitter to stop the bombing.

== Production ==
"Under the Radar" was written by George Schenck and Frank Cardea and directed by Dennis Smith. Executive producer Gary Glasberg called the episode "a 'reset' for us", because it's the first episode after Cote de Pablo left NCIS. Glasberg wanted the episode to "give people an NCIS that is the reason they tune in and have some fun and some lightness and have a really good prime story and an investigation". Glasberg added that "it really feels like a strong, old-time NCIS episode". "[Ziva's absence is] a big part of quite a few episodes", and it will be "glances and references to the empty desk". About how the rest of the team are going to react on the empty desk, Glasberg said "We’re really trying to approach this as realistically and organically as possible, and it’s going to take time for our characters to move on".

Following Cote de Pablo's exit the opening credit in the episode was changed. "[It's] a different main title sequence, [and that] was an interesting process, [both] emotional and challenging", according to Glasberg.

On August 7, 2013, it was announced that Roma Maffia was cast as NCIS special agent Vera Strickland. Her character is "Considered 'one of the boys', [and] goes all the way back to NIS and Mike Franks". According to Glasberg, she is "a woman in her 50s who is a few days away from retirement and just needs to fill the desk time". A younger version of Strickland appears as a main character in the 2024 prequel series NCIS: Origins, played by Diany Rodriguez.

== Reception ==
"Under the Radar" was seen by 18.33 million live viewers following its broadcast on October 8, 2013, with a 2.8/9 share among adults aged 18 to 49. A rating point represents one percent of the total number of television sets in American households, and a share means the percentage of television sets in use tuned to the program. In total viewers, "Under the Radar" easily won NCIS and CBS the night. Compared to the last episode "Past, Present, and Future", "Under the Radar" was down in viewers and adults 18–49.

Douglas Wolfe from TV Fanatic gave the episode 4.5/5 and stated that "The first NCIS episode without Ziva was fast-paced and still interesting, which is hardly surprising, given the quality of writing for this show".
