= Chene Lawson =

American writer and podcaster

Chené Lawson
- Born: Chicago, Illinois
- Occupations: Writer; podcaster; actor
- Years active: 1999-present
- Notable work: All Things Undone; How to Destroy Everything; Amorph
- Website: www.chenelawson.com

Chené Lawson-Peissig is an American writer, podcaster, and actor.

Lawson was born in Chicago, Illinois. She later moved to Los Angeles, where she trained at The Groundlings theater. In 2020, she wrote and hosted the speculative fiction podcast All Things Undone, which debuted at #7 on the Apple Podcasts Sci-Fi chart, and later reached #1. In 2023 the podcast won the Webby for Best Scripted Fiction Podcast. In 2025 Audible released the title as an audiobook, and then contracted Lawson to adapt two of N.K. Jemisin's short stories into an audiodrama, released in 2025 as Amorph. On television, she is best known for the role of Yolanda Hamilton, the derelict mother of Devon Hamilton (Bryton James) on The Young and the Restless.

== Podcasts ==
=== How to Destroy Everything (Episodes 1 and 2, 2023) ===
How to Destroy Everything is a documentary podcast hosted by Danny Jacobs and Darren Grodsky about Danny’s father, Richard Jacobs—a man whose relentless manipulation and schemes left a trail of lawsuits, scams, and shattered lives. Through interviews and investigation, the series uncovers how one person’s destructive behavior devastated families, communities, and ultimately his own son, who describes the podcast as follows:

The true story of a man who wreaks havoc on a community: He taps phone lines, steals notary stamps, gets banned from restaurants, hacks emails, and forges signatures. He inspires a support group composed solely of people he traumatized. In court, he references arcane British case law and submits literally thousands of motions to delay and obstruct, leaving anyone who stands in his way not only penniless but emotionally bankrupt and utterly destroyed. He was also my dad.

==== Awards and recognition ====
- Nominated for the iHeartRadio Podcast Award for best emerging podcast.
- Webby Award Honoree for Best Documentary Podcast award.

==== Credits ====
- Production company: Aileron Podcast Studios (only episodes 1 and 2)
- Executive Producer & editor: Joel Peissig (Only episodes 1 and 2)
- Creator/writer/director: Danny Jacobs & Darren Grodsky

=== All Things Undone (14 episodes, 2020–2021) ===
In this speculative fiction podcast, an alternate history is imagined in which an 1850 solar eclipse fulfills an old prophecy, making enslaved Black people unkillable, and reversing society's power dynamic. Mirabelle, a now freed Black woman, receives visions indicating that the eclipse is a harbinger of "the re/evolution" of earth, but also, that if she and her people fail to complete the prophecy's requirement, the situation could reverse and become even worse than before. The podcast confronts the brutal realities of slavery while exploring how collective uprising can bring about change.

==== Awards and recognition ====
- Winner of the 2023 Webby award for Best Scripted Fiction Podcast.
- Awarded the Micheaux Film Festival Best Podcast award.
- Presented at the Film Life Foundation’s inaugural Social Justice Now Film Festival (SJNFF).

==== Credits ====
- Production company: Aileron Podcast Studio
- Starring: Chené Lawson, JoNell Kennedy, Shannon Holmes, Christen Sussin, Oscar Jordan, Micheal Marcelio, Korbin Miles, Dick Terhune, Kyla Garcia, Ari Fromm, Daniel Lench, Jonathan Tanigaki, Abraham Vasquez, Joel Seales, Ronald Braxton, Dexter Herron, Jimmy Cox, Sean-Michael Lawson, Kevin Robertson, Shawn Carter Peterson, Krystal McCulloch, Taylor Booth, Leshay Boyce, Roxanna Ortega, Danny Jacobs
- Executive Producer: Joel Peissig
- Written by: Chené Lawson
- Directed by: Joel Peissig and Chené Lawson

== Audiobooks ==
- All Things Undone (Audible, 2025)
  - Narrated by Chené Lawson and full cast
  - Written by Chené Lawson
  - Executive producers: Joel Peissig and Chené Lawson
- Amorph (Audible, 2025)
  - Written by N.K. Jemisin and Chené Lawson
  - Narrated by full cast (including Chené Lawson)

== Filmography ==
Film

Year	Title	Role
2000	The Flintstones in Viva Rock Vegas	Kitty
2002	100 Women	Tanya
2004	Hittin' It!	
2005	Hola! (short)	
2006	Ogden: The Inappropriate Yoga Guy (short)	Laura
2008	The Great Buck Howard	Law Student
2011	The Inheritance	Ancestor Lily
2009	The Devil's Tomb	Beautiful Woman
2018	Wednesday (short)	Camille
2021	After Laughter (short)	Gertrude
2022	Finger (short)	Freya Burden
2023	Remedial (short)	Emilia Dobson
2023	A Rosary and a Diamond Ring (short)	Virginia

Television

Year	Title	Role
1999	Undressed	Lexy
2000	Ladies Man	Rachel
2000	Malcolm & Eddie	Leslie Sherman
2001	Providence	Singing Prostitute
2002	The Shield	Tyesha
2002	My Wife and Kids	Monica
2004	Punk'd	Self
2005	Entourage	Jenny
2005–2024	The Young and the Restless	Yolanda Hamilton
2006	Campus Ladies	Lisa
2008	Hollywood Residential	Self
2015	Not to Say	Dana
2024	Phoenix	Alina
