= Shoot 'Em Up (film) =

2007 film by Michael Davis

- Theatrical release poster
- Directed by: Michael Davis
- Written by: Michael Davis
- Produced by: Susan Montford; Don Murphy; Rick Benattar
- Starring: Clive Owen; Paul Giamatti; Monica Bellucci; Stephen McHattie
- Cinematography: Peter Pau
- Edited by: Peter Amundson
- Music by: Paul Haslinger
- Production company: Montford/Murphy
- Distributed by: New Line Cinema
- Release date: September 7, 2007 (United States)
- Running time: 86 minutes
- Country: United States
- Language: English
- Budget: $39 million
- Box office: $26.8 million

Shoot 'Em Up is a 2007 American action film written and directed by Michael Davis and produced by Montford/Murphy. It stars Clive Owen, Paul Giamatti, Monica Bellucci and Stephen McHattie. In the film, Smith (Owen), a drifter and former black-ops soldier, rescues a newborn from being killed by assassin Hertz (Giamatti) and his henchmen. Smith enlists the help of prostitute Donna Quintano (Bellucci) to keep the baby safe as he unravels the conspiracy.

According to Davis, the film's idea came after he saw a gun-battle scene from Hard Boiled in which Chow Yun-fat rescues newborn babies from gangsters. Desiring to make an action film centering on guns, Davis expanded the idea into a script in 2000, accompanied by an animated footage with 17,000 drawings for the action scenes. After a deal with New Line Cinema, filming began in Toronto. The music was composed by Paul Haslinger, while cinematography and editing were handled by Peter Pau and Peter Amundson respectively.

Shoot 'Em Up, before its September 2007 release, was previewed at that year's San Diego Comic-Con and received a positive response. Despite a mediocre commercial performance (recouping less than its budget), critical reception was mixed-to-favorable.

== Plot ==
In a rough part of town, Smith, a carrot-eating drifter and ex-black-ops soldier, sees a pregnant woman fleeing a hitman. Smith kills the hitman by stabbing his head with a carrot and retrieves the woman's pistol. A few more thugs arrive, led by the ruthless Hertz. The woman goes into labor and Smith delivers her baby boy during a shootout, but the mother is shot dead. Smith narrowly escapes with the newborn, where he abandons the baby in a park, hoping someone will adopt the baby, but a passing woman is killed with a shot from Hertz's sniper rifle. Realizing that Hertz is trying to kill the baby, Smith tries to leave him with a prostitute named Donna Quintano.

Hertz arrives at the brothel and tortures Donna for information. Smith returns and kills Hertz's henchmen. After a brief confrontation, Smith shoots Hertz and leaves with Donna and the baby. Hertz survives due to his bulletproof vest. Taking Donna to his hideout, Smith realizes that the baby (whom Smith names Oliver) stops crying when he hears heavy metal music. Smith concludes that Oliver's mother lived near a heavy metal club. Pursued by Hertz, Smith shoots his way out of the hideout; he and Donna then head to the only heavy metal club close to where Smith first encountered Oliver's mother. Above the club they discover an apartment with medical equipment, two deceased pregnant women, and a number of deceased security personnel. Observing that the apartment had been maintaining sperm samples from a single person, Smith concludes that the women were artificially inseminated to give birth to matching bone marrow donors for that person. Smith and Donna evade a professional team of agents that have arrived to clean up the scene and make it to a hotel with Oliver, where Smith and Donna have intercourse.

A squad of gunmen attack, where Smith shoots all of them without stopping intercourse with Donna. Smith notices that the gunmen had the newest Hammerson pistols which are not yet available to the public. Realizing that major monied interests are involved, Smith brings Donna and Oliver to a war museum and hides them in a M24 Chaffee tank for safekeeping. Smith infiltrates the Hammerson factory and hears Hertz and Hammerson saying they do not want the frontrunner for the US presidency to implement his sweeping gun control proposals. Smith also notices that Hammerson owns a German Shepherd named Duchess. Smith stealthily booby-traps the facility with firearms, allowing him to kill most of Hertz' thugs and the factory's security personnel and escape. During a shootout, Hertz reveals that he learned about Smith's background and that his wife and son were killed in a shootout at a burger joint. After returning to the tank where Donna and Oliver are still hiding, Smith sees an article about Senator Rutledge, a Democratic presidential candidate who favors stricter gun laws. Smith deduces that Rutledge has cancer and requires a bone marrow transplant, and that the apartment-turned-donor factory that he discovered earlier was for Rutledge.

Various women at that facility were artificially inseminated (with Rutledge's sperm) to create donors. Without a matching transplant donor, the senator will die; Smith concludes this is why Hertz and Hammerson want Oliver (the only living potential donor for Rutledge) dead. Smith tells Donna to leave town and contacts one of Rutledge's security personnel (nicknamed "Go-to Guy") to request a meeting with Rutledge. Meeting on an airplane, the senator confirms Smith's suspicions but Smith notices dog hair on Rutledge's trousers. Deducing that the hair belongs to Duchess and that the Senator has made a deal with Hammerson, Smith takes Rutledge hostage. Hertz and Hammerson appear and reveal that they agreed to help Rutledge find a bone-marrow donor, on the condition that Rutledge protects Hertz's constitutional right to bear arms when elected president. Smith takes Senator Rutledge to the airplane's cargo hold, and explaining that his assassination "will cause public outrage and trigger immense support" for his gun control proposals, kills the senator.

Smith parachutes from the airplane and kills several pursuing henchmen, but is himself shot and collapses after he lands. Smith awakens in Hammerson's mansion; Hertz tortures him, breaking his fingers in an attempt to learn where Smith sent Donna and Oliver. As Hertz prepares to cut Smith's eyes, Smith breaks free and kills Hammerson and several thugs. Struggling to use his gun, Smith places live bullets between his broken fingers and detonates them with a fireplace, critically wounding Hertz. Smith and Hertz struggle, but Smith finally kills Hertz. Smith travels with Duchess to an ice cream parlor, where Donna works as a waitress while watching Oliver. Surprised to see each other alive, Smith and Donna kiss passionately. When amateur armed robbers enter the parlor and despite his hands being bandaged, Smith shoots them by using a carrot to pull the trigger.

== Cast ==
- Clive Owen as Mr. Smith
- Paul Giamatti as Mr. Karl Hertz
- Monica Bellucci as Donna Quintano
- Stephen McHattie as Hammerson
- Greg Bryk as Go-To Guy
- Daniel Pilon as Senator Rutledge
- Ramona Pringle as Baby's Mother
- Julian Richings as Hertz's Driver
- Stephen R. Hart as Club Bouncer
- Scott McCord also appears as one of Hertz's Henchmen who is shot in the posterior twice, once by Smith and once by Hertz.
- Laura de Carteret as Woman In Museum

The protagonist, known only as Smith, is an homage to the Man with No Name of Sergio Leone's Spaghetti Westerns. Smith's misanthropy derived from writer-director Michael Davis' frustration when his 1989 script about Alfred Kinsey failed to materialize as a feature film. His research about Kinsey and human sexuality in general inspired the character of Donna Quintano, a gold-hearted prostitute and Smith's eventual love interest. Hertz, a former FBI profiler who lives a double life as an assassin and a family patriarch, pursues Smith. According to co-producer Susan Montford, the antagonist was modeled after the BTK Killer. Hertz's feud with Smith has been compared to that of Bugs Bunny and Elmer Fudd in Looney Tunes because Smith (like Bugs) spends considerable time eating carrots in the film. Davis acknowledged that the Looney Tunes reference was deliberate.

== Production ==
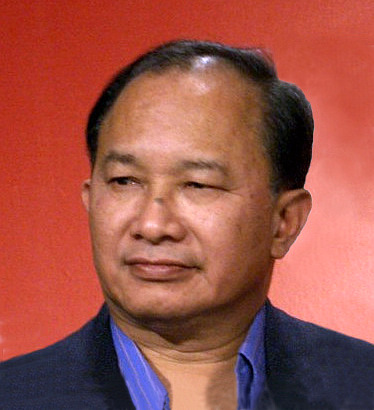
John Woo's film Hard Boiled significantly influenced the conception of Shoot 'Em Up.

Davis had wanted to make an action film which focused on guns and was devoid of explosions. He conceived the film after seeing a scene from John Woo's film Hard Boiled (1992), in which Chow Yun-fat rescues newborn babies from gangsters while engaged in a gunfight. Davis felt that the scene could be expanded into a feature film, a "gun-like" version of Run Lola Run (1998). By 2000, Davis had begun writing the screenplay; when the script was finished, however, studios refused to get it made after the Columbine High School massacre happened, causing him to shelve the project and return to making low-budget independent films.

During his subsequent years as an independent filmmaker, Davis started putting together an animatic of the script's action scenes using a Wacom tablet and the iMovie app. The animatic, which he made originally as a hobby, became his pitch animation in finding a producer for the project. He sent the script to Don Murphy, a producer he went to film school with at the USC School of Cinematic Arts, and Murphy as well as co-producers Susan Montford and Rick Benattar enjoyed it. Murphy, Montford and Benattar also saw the film's potential as a big-budget production, so they sent the animatic to major film studio New Line Cinema. New Line executives Jeff Katz and Cale Boyter liked it and they passed it on to Toby Emmerich, who greenlit the project at the behest of New Line founder Bob Shaye.

Davis's first choice to play Smith was Clive Owen, who signed as the lead because the script impressed him. The role of Donna went to Monica Bellucci, who liked the script and the character: an independent woman who "does dangerous, dark dirty things in a playful way". The multilingual Bellucci dubbed herself in the film's French and Italian versions. Davis cast Paul Giamatti, who usually played "nice guy" roles, against type to avoid the stereotype of a physically imposing villain, and because he believed Giamatti could deliver the duality of the role.

Shoot 'Em Up was produced on a budget of $39 million. Principal photography took place in Toronto and lasted fifty-five days, with Hong Kong's Peter Pau serving as cinematographer. Before filming, Owen and Giamatti were trained in firearms. Although he found the stunts physically demanding, Owen resolved to perform most of them himself. In the skydiving scene, he was aided by a Cirque du Soleil safety harness. Eighty firearms were used during production, and $70,000 of the film's budget was allocated for 6,000 squibs.

== Music ==
The score for Shoot 'Em Up was composed by Paul Haslinger and recorded at NRG Recording Studios in North Hollywood, California. It was released on CD and as a digital download on August 28, 2007, by Varèse Sarabande. A soundtrack album of nu metal and rock songs by various artists was made available on February 12, 2008.

== Marketing ==
In July 2007, Shoot 'Em Up was publicized with a guerrilla marketing campaign by the London-based agency New Media Maze. The campaign included a viral video and a website selling bogus items ranging from bulletproof strollers to riot helmets for infants. A video was released on YouTube in which the company claimed to test the bulletproof stroller by shooting at it with a submachine gun while a baby was in it. The baby was then removed from the stroller unharmed. The hoax campaign was taken seriously by global media and the blogging community; Aftonbladet, Sweden's largest evening tabloid, carried the story on its online edition for some time.

In November 2007, two ads that showed Owen and Giamatti holding guns were banned in the United Kingdom by the Advertising Standards Authority (ASA) on the grounds that they had "glamorized and glorified gun crime" and "were offensive and insensitive toward families directly affected by gun crime". At the time of the ruling, it was also reported that gun violence in the UK was on the rise.

== Release ==
Although Variety reported a planned release during the 2006 holiday season, Shoot 'Em Up was previewed in September of that year. The film was released in American theaters on September 7, 2007. It was released on the same day in Canada, opening on 235 screens against 3:10 to Yuma. Audience response to a screening at the 2007 San Diego Comic-Con was positive.

Shoot 'Em Up opened in fourth place on its first weekend, earning $5,716,139 at 2,108 locations. Overall, the film grossed $12,807,139 over six weeks in North American theaters and $26,820,641 worldwide. It was regarded as a box-office bomb, recouping less than its budget.

The film's DVD and Blu-ray versions were released in January 2008 by New Line Home Entertainment with a BTS featurette titled "Ballet of Bullets", 17 minutes of animatics and audio commentary from director Michael Davis, trailers and deleted scenes. New Line released another DVD and Blu-ray of the film in a two-disc version in August 2011.

== Reception ==
=== Critical response ===
Rotten Tomatoes gives the film an approval rating of 67%, with an average rating of 6.15/10, based on reviews from 161 critics. The website's "Critics Consensus" for the film reads, "As preposterous and over-the-top as Shoot 'Em Up may be, its humor and non-stop action make for a very enjoyable film." On Metacritic it has a weighted average score of 49 out of 100, based on reviews from 23 critics, indicating "mixed or average reviews". Audiences polled by CinemaScore during its opening weekend gave the film an average grade of "B−" on a scale ranging from A+ to F.

Peter Travers rated the film 3 out of 4 stars for Rolling Stone, calling it "eighty-two minutes of hardcore pow. [...] You'll be exhilarated – also exhausted." Roger Ebert for the Chicago Sun-Times scored the film 3 1/2 out of 4 stars, comparing it favorably with Sin City as "the most audacious, implausible, cheerfully offensive, hyperactive action picture [he had] seen". Frank Scheck in The Hollywood Reporter called it a "ramped-up action movie on steroids" that "makes Hard Boiled look restrained". Ebert extended his praise toward the film's acting, calling Owen's character sympathetic and Giamatti's "surprisingly, teeth-gnashingly evil". Scheck complimented Owen's "low-rent James Bond" performance, and was delighted to see Giamatti cast against his usual "nerdy" on-screen persona.

A. O. Scott gave the film a scathing review for The New York Times, calling it "a worthless piece of garbage" and that it was one of several "witless, soulless, heartless movies that mistake noise for bravura and tastelessness for wit". Stephen Hunter in The Washington Post said the film "is just gunfights strung together, without a whisper of coherence or meaning. The fights are staged so that they all look the same, and the principle is always the same: The gunman's multiple antagonists never hit, and he never misses." James Berardinelli gave the film a mixed review, saying that while it delivered gunfights as advertised, he complained that it "pretty much consists of shoot-outs and chases overtaking each other like waves rolling onto a beach, each more over-the-top than its predecessor". Berardinelli scored the film 2.5 out of 4 stars, writing that he "like[d] the audacity and its willingness to push the envelope beyond the limits of good taste. In the end, it's a little too long and uneven to recommend outright, but [he] won't deny having enjoyed aspects of what Davis is offering."

In 2016, Shoot 'Em Up made the list of "25 great action films that are 90 minutes or under" compiled by Nick Horton of Den of Geek. Rotten Tomatoes ranked Shoot 'Em Up at No. 111 on its list of the "140 Essential Actions Movies To Watch".
