= Muddling Through =

American television sitcom (1994)

- Genre: Sitcom
- Created by: Barton Dean
- Starring: Stephanie Hodge; D. David Morin; Jennifer Aniston; Aimee Brooks; Scott Waara
- Composer: Frank Fitzpatrick
- Country of origin: United States
- Original language: English
- No. of seasons: 1
- No. of episodes: 10 (1 unaired)

Production
- Executive producer: Barton Dean
- Producer: Barbara Dorio
- Running time: 30 minutes
- Production companies: ELP Communications; CBS Entertainment Productions; Savage Cake Productions; Columbia Pictures Television

Original release
- Network: CBS
- Release: July 9 – September 7, 1994

Muddling Through is an American television sitcom that aired on CBS from July 9, 1994, to September 7, 1994. The series starred Stephanie Hodge as an ex-convict trying to turn her life around.

== History ==
The series was initially developed in 1993 with the intent of airing it in the fall season, but it was shelved.

Jennifer Aniston (playing the daughter of Hodge's character) completed filming just before booking Rachel Green on NBC's fall sitcom Friends. Friends debuted just two weeks after Muddling Through aired its final episode, with one episode remaining unaired.

According to NBC program executive Preston Beckman, Aniston had booked Friends as her second position and next role if Muddling Through failed, though Warner Bros. casting had positioned her as their top choice to play Rachel Green. NBC Entertainment head Warren Littlefield, who was under pressure by Warner Bros. Television to have the network take on more financial liability to take Friends, did so.

NBC's programmers, including Beckman, then targeted the show's Saturday night timeslot (unusual for a summer entry at the time, and for the services of an actress whose trajectory was already on the rise) with replays of the network's popular Moment of Truth and Danielle Steel telefilm series (under an early version of the network's 90s summer marketing of programming repeats as being new to viewers if they had not seen their original broadcast) to starve the show's female demographic, in order to induce its eventual cancellation and allow Aniston to fully commit to Friends.

By its last three episodes, it was airing on Wednesdays and unable to overcome proven women-targeted shows on other networks, including repeats of Unsolved Mysteries and the season premiere of Beverly Hills 90210 on Fox, along with CBS's oncoming struggles with losing many of its prime affiliates due to the loss of NFL rights to Fox. Those affiliates had already begun to stop promoting CBS programming in the weeks before, including Muddling Through.

== Plot ==
Connie Drego is an ex-con, paroled after serving three years in prison for shooting her cheating husband, Sonny, in the buttocks. Connie returns home to work at Drego's Oasis, the family's diner/motel in rural Michigan. Other characters include Madeline, Connie's oldest daughter who is married to Duane Cooper, the cop who arrested Connie and whose testimony led to her conviction, and Kerri, Connie's youngest daughter.

== Cast ==
=== Starring ===
- Stephanie Hodge as Connie Drego (10 episodes)
- D. David Morin as Sonny Drego (10 episodes)
- Jennifer Aniston as Madeline Drego Cooper (10 episodes)
- Aimee Brooks as Kerri Drego (10 episodes)
- Scott Waara as Duane Cooper (10 episodes)

=== Recurring ===
- Hal Landon Jr. as Gidney (7 episodes)
- Hank Underwood as Lyle (7 episodes)
- Forry Smith as Zane Whitman (2 episodes)

=== Guest starring ===
- Sara Suzanne Brown as Miss Lagermeister
- Blake Clark as Ralph
- Pamela Dunlap as Estelle
- Donald Gibb as Bub
- Linda Hart as Fanny
- Andy Kindler as Beer Distributor
- Don McManus as Nick
- Barbara Sharma as Mrs. Cooper
- Lisa Sundstedt as Attractive Woman
- Richard Venture as Mr. Spivey

== Episodes ==
No.	Title	Directed by	Written by	Original release date	Viewers (millions)
1	"The More Things Change, the More They Stay the Same"	James Widdoes	Barton Dean	July 9, 1994	9.1
After two and a half years in prison, Drego family matriarch, Connie, has returned home to put her family back together.
2	"Let It Be Normal"	Robby Benson	Daniel Palladino	July 16, 1994	8.6
Connie's first full day of freedom brings a visit from her parole officer and disappointment from a friend.
3	"Back by Demand"	Andy Ackerman	Barton Dean	July 23, 1994	7.5
Kerri decides that school sucks and she can get by with her street smarts.
4	"It's a Date"	Andy Ackerman	Barton Dean	July 30, 1994	7.9
Connie and Sonny agree to date other people.
5	"Second Time's the Charm"	Robby Benson	Barton Dean	August 6, 1994	8.2
Madeline and Duane decide to renew their vows but Connie refuses to attend.
6	"Cabin Fever"	Andy Ackerman	Larry Spencer	August 13, 1994	7.6
An old friend visits and sets his sights on dating Connie after hearing of her divorce from Sonny.
7	"Dog Duty"	Pamela Fryman	Lee Aronsohn	August 24, 1994	8.9
Duane is assigned to a new beat and Kerri tries to persuade Connie to buy her a car.
8	"Ooh, Maybe Baby"	Pamela Fryman	Larry Spencer	August 31, 1994	8.9
Madeline puts her husband Duane on ice (literally) in preparation of their fertility clinic visit. Once the two are told they are fertile, they return home with plans to procreate.
9	"Guess Who's Coming to Dinner?"	Pamela Fryman	Robert Borden	September 7, 1994	8.4
All Connie's dad wants for Father's Day is for her to leave him alone. When her parents drop by for an impromptu reunion, Connie and the rest of the family are thrilled. A problem arises which is that no one ever told her dad.
10	"Take Any Job and Shove It"	Philip Charles MacKenzie	Clay Graham	Unaired	N/A
An unwanted tax bill leads to boa dancing. When Sonny gets a $4,000 invoice from the IRS on his coffee shop property he is distraught. That is until his ex-wife Connie reminds him she was awarded the shop in their divorce.
