= Scott Waara =

American actor

- Born: June 5, 1957 (age 69); Chicago, Illinois, U.S.
- Occupation: Actor
- Years active: 1986–present

Scott Waara (born June 5, 1957) is an American actor. He made his Broadway debut as a member of the ensemble for the musical Wind in the Willows, and performed in Welcome to the Club and City of Angels. He won the Best Featured Actor Tony Award for his performance of Herman in The Most Happy Fella in 1992.

== Career ==
Waara played Duane Cooper in the short-lived 1994 CBS sitcom Muddling Through. He portrayed B. Santa Maria in the 2004 Award-Winning short film The Proverb. He has continued starring in TV shows like Numb3rs, CSI: Miami, and Without a Trace. In addition, Waara starred in the 2009 film The Least Among You with Lauren Holly and Louis Gossett Jr. In 2015, Waara portrayed Da in the national touring company of Once.

== Acting credits ==
=== Film ===
Year	Title	Role	Notes
1993	Beethoven's 2nd	Banker	
1996	Eye for an Eye	Detective	
2008	Cold Play	Auctioneer	
2009	The Least Among You	Prof. Powell	

=== Television ===
Year	Title	Role	Notes
1986	American Playhouse	Roger	Episode: "The Rise and Rise of Daniel Rocket"
1992	Guiding Light	Ken	Episode #1.11482
1994	Muddling Through	Duane Cooper	10 episodes
1995	Indictment: The McMartin Trial	Dean Gits	Television film
1996	Townies	Eric	Episode: "Faith, Hope & Charity"
1999	Family Law	Bill Asserov	Episode: "Damages"
2000	Gideon's Crossing	Rob Majors	Episode: "The Way"
2001	61*	Gus Mauch	Television film
2002	Crossing Jordan	Husband with Baby	Episode: "One Twelve"
2003	Judging Amy	Atty. Eldon Hearn	Episode: "Just Say Oops"
2005	Without a Trace	Bartender	Episode: "Transition"
2006	CSI: Miami	Doctor	Episode: "Rio"
2007	Numbers	Jason Brasher	Episode: "Democracy"
2013	NCIS	Mel Frazier	Episode: "Under the Radar"

=== Theatre ===
Year	Title	Role	Notes	Ref.
1984	The Rise and Rise of Daniel Rocket, Playwrights Horizons	Roger		
1985	Wind in the Willows	Police Sergeant / Ensemble	Broadway	
1987–1989	South Pacific	Lt. Joseph Cable	National tour	
1989	Welcome to the Club	Kevin Bursteter	Broadway	
1989	City of Angels	Jimmy Powers	Broadway	
1992	The Most Happy Fella	Herman	Broadway	
1996	Du Barry Was a Lady	Harry Norton / Captain of the King's Guard	Encores! concert	
2015	Once	Da	National tour	
