= Double Blind =

- NCIS episode
- Episode no.: Season 10; Episode 23
- Directed by: Dennis Smith
- Written by: Christopher J. Walid and Steven D. Binder
- Original air date: May 7, 2013

Guest appearances
- Colin Hanks as Richard Parsons; Sean Marquette as Petty Officer Third Class Evan Lowry; Meeghan Holaway as Dr. Hale; Fred Koehler as Simon Gravy; Neil Brown Jr. as Martin Archer; Catherine Kresge as Marine Lance Corporal Stella Brooks; Emily Dunham as Female Soldier; Jessie Graff as Female Soldier

Episode chronology
← Previous "Revenge"	Next → "Damned If You Do"
- NCIS season 10

"Double Blind" is the 23rd episode of the tenth season of the American police procedural drama NCIS, and the 233rd episode overall. It originally aired on CBS in the United States on May 7, 2013. The episode is written by Christopher J. Walid and Steven D. Binder and directed by Dennis Smith, and was seen by 17.56 million viewers.

== Plot ==
NCIS is subject to an investigation from the Department of Defense, questioning their response to the deaths of Eli David and Jackie Vance. Gibbs is accused of concealing evidence and obstruction of justice. Meanwhile, the team investigates if a Petty Officer is really being stalked or suffering from paranoia.

== Production ==
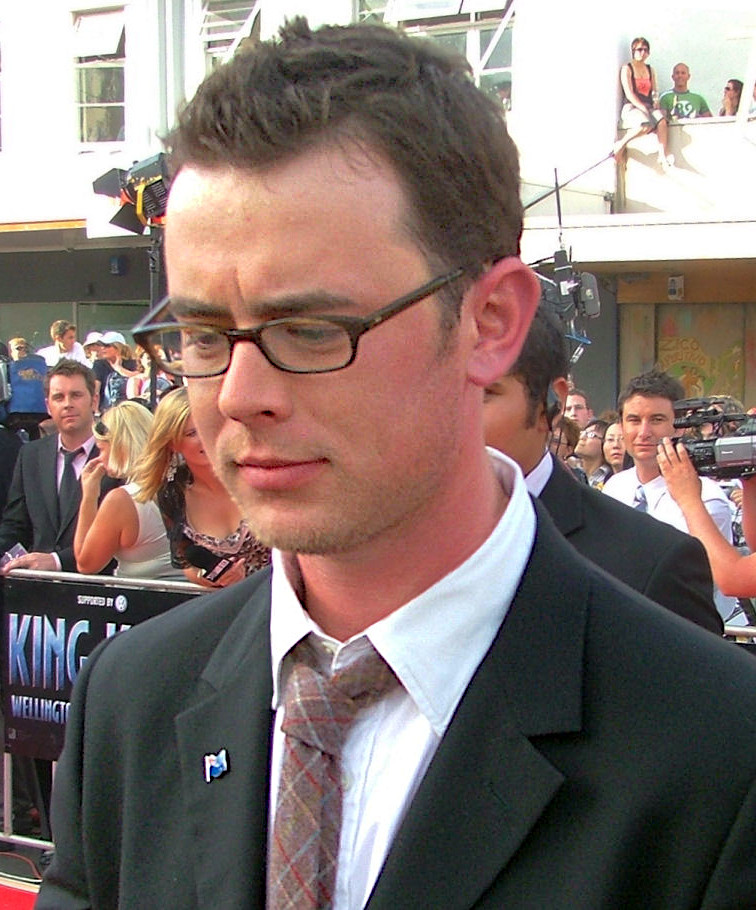
Colin Hanks guest starred as DoD investigator Richard Parsons.

=== Writing ===
"Double Blind" was written by Christopher J. Walid and Steven D. Binder and directed by Dennis Smith. "This episode definitely does not end well - at least not for Gibbs", Waild and Smith wrote about the episode, and continued saying "DoD IG Investigator Richard Parsons is out for Gibb’s blood – though Parsons does a brilliant job distracting our team from his goal". About the ending in the episode, Waild and Smith wrote "it’s probably a safe bet that Parsons will have his work cut out for him as he continues his witch-hunt. Especially if the team dynamic that played out in this episode is any indication".

=== Casting ===
TVLine announced the casting of Colin Hanks as Department of Defense investigator Richard Parsons on April 10, 2013. The casting also included the season finale episode "Damned If You Do". Executive producer Gary Glasberg described the character as "Ken Starr, J. Edgar Hoover and an angry pitbull wrapped into one". Unlike most episodes, CBS' press release on "Double Blind" did not include the other guest actors.

== Reception ==
"Double Blind" was seen by 17.56 million live viewers following its broadcast on May 7, 2013, with a 3.1/10 share among adults aged 18 to 49. A rating point represents one percent of the total number of television sets in American households, and a share means the percentage of television sets in use tuned to the program. In total viewers, "Double Blind" easily won NCIS and CBS the night. The spin-off NCIS: Los Angeles drew second and was seen by 13.18 million viewers. Compared to the last episode "Revenge", "Double Blind" was down in viewers and even in adults 18–49.

Douglas Wolfe from TV Fanatic gave the episode 4.8/5 and stated that "[the episode] can be summed up in one word: loyalty. Or, if you like, four words: "I've got your back". Never has the family aspect of the NCIS team ever been more evident and on display, particularly in the face of a common enemy. [...] The writers - through Parsons' activities - played NCIS fans like a flute in this episode."
