= Whiskey Tango Foxtrot (NCIS) =

- NCIS episode
- Episode no.: Season 11; Episode 1
- Directed by: Tony Wharmby
- Written by: Gary Glasberg
- Original air date: September 24, 2013

Guest appearances
- Colin Hanks as DOD IG Investigator Richard Parsons; Joe Spano as Senior FBI Agent Tobias C. Fornell; Alan Dale as Homeland Senior Division Chief Tom Morrow; Allan Louis as Navy Captain Dominick Wayne; Damon Dayoub as Adam Eshel; Costas Mandylor as Tomás Mendez; Margo Harshman as Delilah Fielding; Ivan Shaw as Victor Cheng; Jared Ward as JSOC Navy Lieutenant Eric Kagen; Will Harris as Murray Hines; Matt Craven as Secretary of the Navy Clayton Jarvis; Gabi Coccio as 13-year-old Ziva David; Ben Morrison as Young Eli David

Episode chronology
← Previous "Damned If You Do"	Next → "Past, Present, and Future"
- NCIS season 11

"Whiskey Tango Foxtrot" is the first episode of the eleventh season of the American police procedural drama NCIS, and the 235th episode overall. It originally aired on CBS in the United States on September 24, 2013. The episode is written by Gary Glasberg and directed by Tony Wharmby, and was seen by 20.02 million viewers.

== Plot ==
In the aftermath of the Season 10 finale, Gibbs' team has been left divided as Tony and McGee attempt to adjust to life as civilians while Ziva has returned home to Israel. Parsons' investigation into Gibbs' team continues but things take an intense turn when a hotel bomb explodes, killing SECNAV Clayton Jarvis and seriously injuring Tom Morrow. In the meantime, Vance and Navy Captain Dominick Wayne inform Gibbs that the bombing could involve a terrorist organization a deceased Navy intelligence officer had been investigating. When Gibbs and Tony were shot at by unknown persons and Ducky and Palmer find a former FBI agent-turned-mercenary hacker-for-hire in their autopsy room trying to access their files, Parsons and the NCIS team soon realize that another mysterious person or group is targeting the entire team one by one. Vance also discovers that Ziva is the next target and Tony must track her down before it is too late.

== Production ==
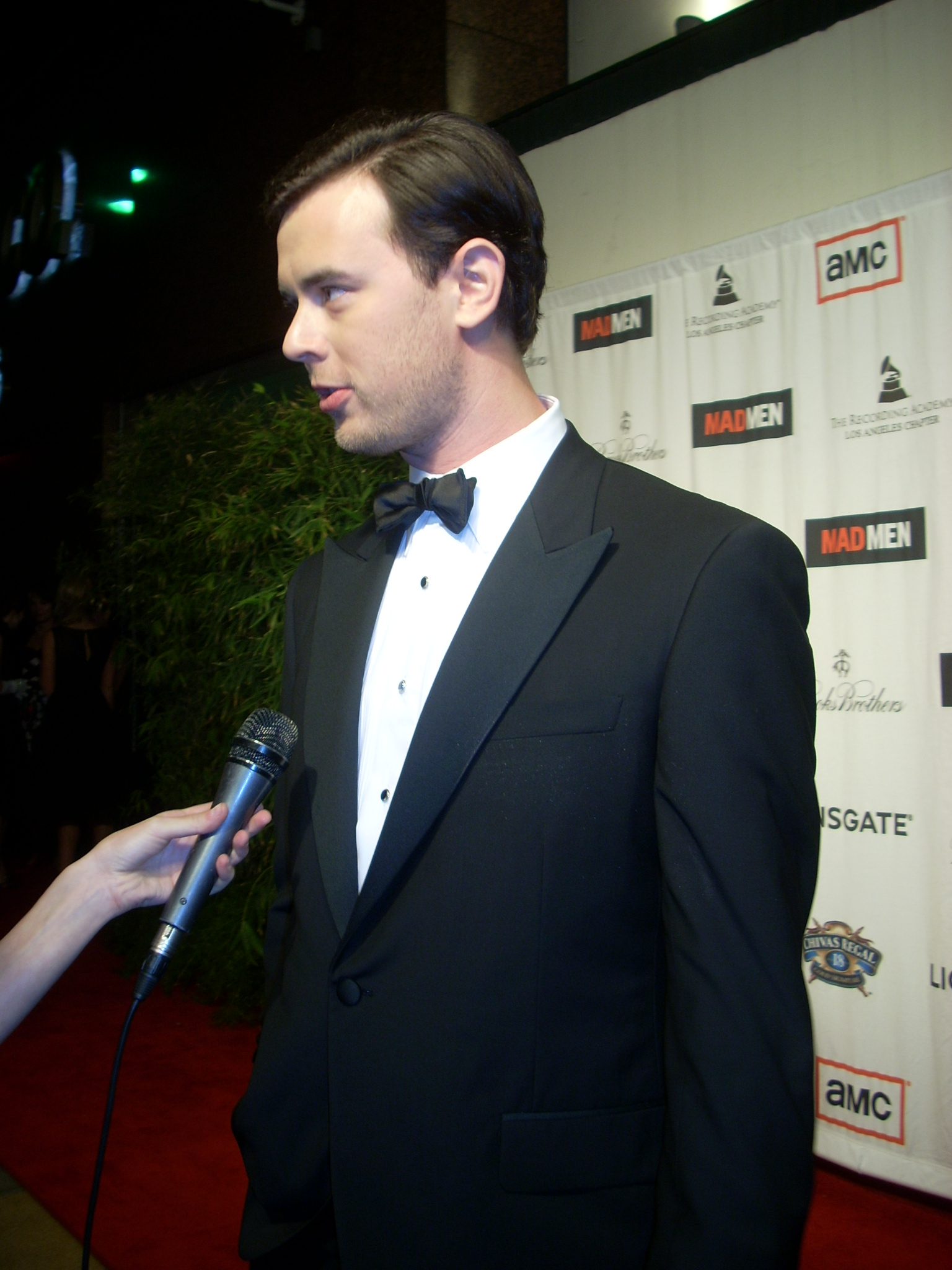
Colin Hanks reprised his role as DOD Investigator Richard Parsons.

=== Writing ===
"Whiskey Tango Foxtrot" was written by Gary Glasberg and directed by Tony Wharmby. Glasberg had already begun working on the storyline for the episode when it was announced Cote de Pablo, who portrays Ziva David, would not return as a regular for the eleventh season. Because of de Pablo's exit, the continued story from the tenth season finale had to be changed. "Someone asked me if I was planning for this, but I really wasn’t, so basically the minute that this became real, I had to throw out a lot of what I was planning to do and start from scratch". Instead of the planned "single premiere episode" Glasberg extended it to a two-part arc because of the departure of Cote de Pablo's character Ziva David.

=== Casting ===
On July 30, 2013, TV Guide announced the return of Colin Hanks for the first two episodes as Defense Department investigator Richard Parsons, a character that was introduced at the end of the tenth season. Joe Spano and Alan Dale also reprised their roles as Senior FBI Agent Tobias C. Fornell and Tom Morrow. On the same date Margo Harshman was cast in a potentially recurring role as Timothy McGee's girlfriend, Delilah.

== Reception ==
"Whiskey Tango Foxtrot" was seen by 20.02 million live viewers following its broadcast on September 24, 2013, with a 3.6/11 share among adults aged 18 to 49. A rating point represents one percent of the total number of television sets in American households, and a share means the percentage of television sets in use tuned to the program. In total viewers, "Whiskey Tango Foxtrot" easily won NCIS and CBS the night. Compared to the last episode "Damned If You Do", "Whiskey Tango Foxtrot" was up in viewers and adults 18–49.

Douglas Wolfe from TV Fanatic gave the episode 4.8/5 and stated that "With the announcement of Cote de Pablo's exit from the series, writer Gary Glasberg had to scramble to plot out a decent storyline – and it showed. Intricate and detailed, this episode demanded our full attention. […] Frankly, this is the kind of NCIS show I find compelling: lots of action and lots to think about."
