= Moving Target (1988 American film) =

1988 made-for-TV mystery-drama film directed by Chris Thomson

- Written by: Andy Tennant
- Directed by: Chris Thomson
- Starring: Jason Bateman; Chynna Phillips; Jack Wagner
- Music by: Michel Rubini
- Country of origin: United States
- Original language: English

Production
- Producers: Christopher Morgan; Andy Tennant; Ed Hunsaker
- Cinematography: Neil Roach
- Editor: Mark Melnick
- Running time: 100 minutes
- Production companies: Bateman Company Productions; Finnegan/Pinchuk Productions; Lewis B. Chesler Productions; MGM/UA Television

Original release
- Network: NBC
- Release: February 8, 1988

Moving Target is a 1988 American television film directed by Chris Thomson.

== Plot ==
Seventeen-year-old Toby Kellogg returns home early to Los Angeles from the Interlochen Center for the Arts' Interlochen Arts Camp, a classical-music summer camp in Michigan, where his father had sent him, to discover that his family is missing and his house is empty of all furniture. Unbeknownst to Toby, his father has become a federal informant against his father's former boss, and thus his family has entered the federal witness protection program. Toby's father's boss is involved in a mob-directed corporate operation handling drug money, and Toby would have joined his parents in hiding had he not gone to music camp. In Los Angeles, Toby searches for his parents, while the police are trying to find Toby. In addition, a mob hit man is trying to find Toby as well.

== Cast ==
- Jason Bateman as Toby Kellogg
- John Glover as Dobbins
- Jack Wagner as Tim Sutcliff - Scott Syndicate
- Chynna Phillips as Megan Lawrence
- Donna Mitchell as Sarah Kellogg
- Claude Brooks as David
- Bernie Coulson as Jeff Ackley
- Richard Dysart as Arthur Cambridge
- Tom Skerritt as Joseph Kellogg
- William Lanteau as Mr. Bauman
- Robert Downey Sr. as Weinberg
- Tom Fridley as Darrin
- Arnold F. Turner as Suggs
- Javier Grajeda as Lopez
- Aimee Brooks as Jody Kellogg

== Production ==
The movie began filming on December 7, 1987 and was shot in Los Angeles.

In an interview with Newsday, Bateman acknowledged that Moving Target offered him a different role than the show "Valerie's Family," which had maintained his status as a teen idol. "It's advantageous to keep the audience I have out there on its toes," he told Newsday, adding that he did many of his own stunts in the film. "I did some stuff that had me jumping on the back of fire engines. I also did some tricky driving. It was great fun."

== Reception ==
The film received mixed reviews. In the Chicago Sun-Times, Daniel Ruth, who gave the film three stars, told readers that he had "never been a big fan of Bateman, a likable-enough young man who sort of fills up space on 'Valerie's Family.' His 'Moving Target' promised to be a dreary two-hour exercise in flattering a budding star's ego." However, Ruth acknowledged that his preconceived notions about the movie were wrong, and that it was "a nice, little movie, full of action, crisp dialogue and a host of terrific performances cast against type, which combine to provide a taut evening of entertainment." Ruth also hailed the performances of Wagner, who he wrote gave "a scene-stealing performance," and Glover, who, Ruth wrote, delivered "an effective effort in his small role." In all, Ruth concluded that one of the "more enjoyable aspects of this made-for-TV movie is watching a young actor taking a giant step forward in his professional development." Ruth concluded his review by writing, "Thanks for a pleasant surprise, Jason." And critic Tom Green of USA Today called the film "a winner" that "gets off to a clunky start, but by the time Mom, Dad, little brother, the dog and all the furniture have vanished, we've got a thriller that's passably mesmerizing for a winter evening."

By contrast, Chicago Tribune critic Clifford Terry disliked the film. "Full of contrivances and coincidences and stupid G-men, this puerile piffle was clumsily directed by Chris Thompson from the preposterous script by Andy Tennant, and the supporting cast includes two fine actors, Richard Dysart of "L.A. Law" and John Glover of "An Early Frost," in kissoff roles," Terry wrote. And John Corry of The New York Times gave the film a mediocre review, writing that "Mr. Batemen, of NBC's Valerie's Family, is fine, although he doesn't have much to do in most of the movie except look glum. Moving Target - directed by Chris Thomson - isn't so much a story as a series of incidents: What will Toby do next? It's a relief when he finally snatches a briefcase from a real estate agent and looks for clues about his parents. Until then, he's had to mope. Nonetheless, Moving Target is easy to take. You won't be on the edge of your seat; you probably won't doze off, either. At the end of the movie, Toby turns out to be a hero. It is unlikely you will be surprised."

Finally, critic Tom Shales of the Washington Post called the film a "moderately acceptable mystery thriller" but savaged Bateman's performance. Shales wrote that Bateman's character "ambles through shaggily and draggily, as if it were a nuisancey trip to the 7-Eleven for cigarettes and beer" and that "whatever the opposite of galvanizing is, that's what this smirking little shlub brings to the film." Shales added that he felt that Bateman "doesn't convey any urgency or passion in attempting to locate the folks," and that the film had a credibility problem, concluding that "if they'd hired an actual actor for the lead role, a viewer might be able to feel some slight inclination to give a hoot."
