= Chippewa Lake, Ohio =

- Village
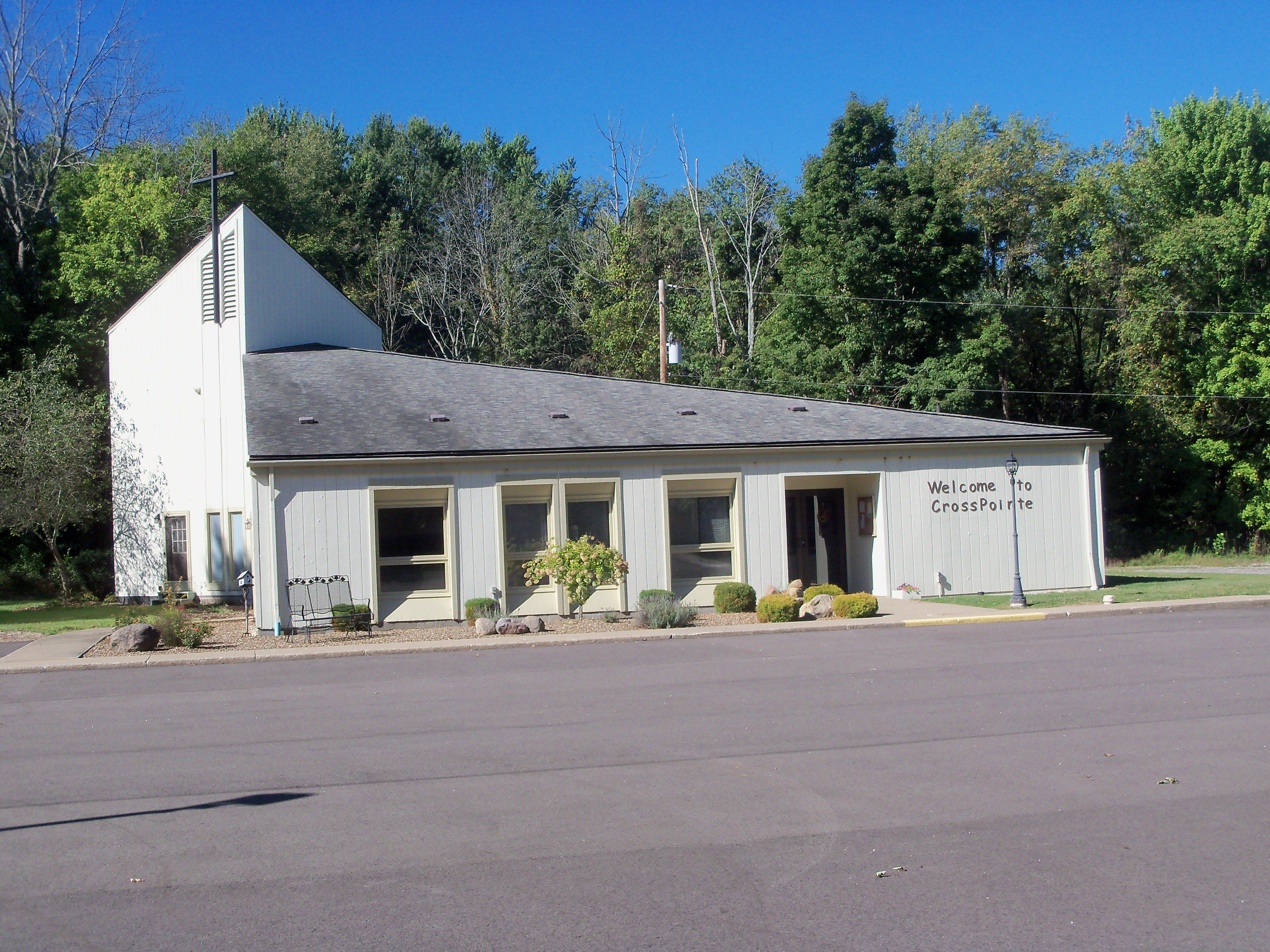
- CrossPointe Church occupies the former Jesus Divine Redeemer Catholic Church building

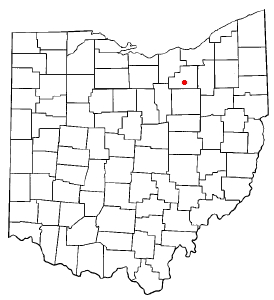
- Location of Chippewa Lake, Ohio

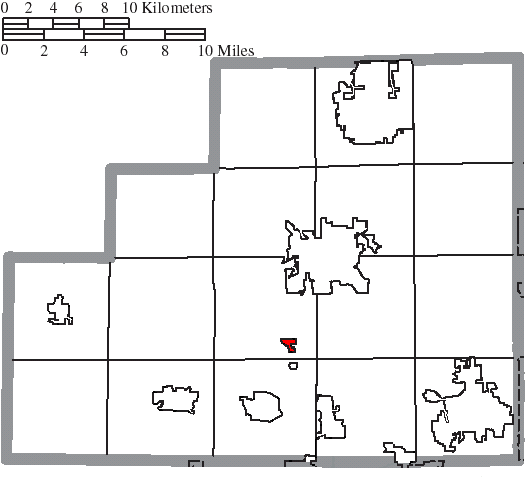
- Location of Chippewa Lake in Medina County
- Coordinates: 41°04′25″N 81°54′17″W
- Country: United States
- State: Ohio
- County: Medina

Area
  - Total: 0.25 sq mi (0.64 km^{2})
  - Land: 0.25 sq mi (0.64 km^{2})
  - Water: 0 sq mi (0.00 km^{2})
- Elevation: 1,027 ft (313 m)

Population (2020)
  - Total: 654
  - Estimate (2023): 661
  - Density: 2,650.7/sq mi (1,023.46/km^{2})
- Time zone: UTC-5 (Eastern (EST))
  - Summer (DST): UTC-4 (EDT)
- ZIP code: 44215
- Area code: 330
- FIPS code: 39-14282
- GNIS feature ID: 2397623

Chippewa Lake (formerly Chippewa-on-the-Lake) is a village in Medina County, Ohio, United States. It is located on Chippewa Lake, a natural inland lake in Ohio. The village was incorporated in 1920. The population was 654 at the 2020 census.

== History ==
Chippewa Lake took its name from the Ojibwe tribe of Native Americans.

In the 1880s, Oscar Townsend and the Cleveland, Lorain, & Wheeling Railroad developed a vacation resort, eventually called Chippewa Lake Park, on the banks of Chippewa Lake. The Great Depression and extinction of interurban rail service crippled the park, but in 1937, Parker Beach purchased the resort. In 1978, after more than 100 years of operation, Chippewa Lake Park was shut down.

In 2008, scenes for the horror film Closed For the Season (released in 2010) were shot at the abandoned amusement park, using many of its decrepit attractions as backgrounds.

A large estate that was originally part of Townsend's empire in town remains intact today, and has operated for decades as The Oaks Lodge restaurant. The restaurant is a popular event space; its lakeside gazebo is often used for weddings.

== Geography ==
According to the United States Census Bureau, the village has a total area of 0.25 square miles (0.65 km^{2}), all land.

=== Climate ===
Climate data for Chippewa Lake, Ohio, 1991–2020 normals, extremes 1895–2015
Month	Jan	Feb	Mar	Apr	May	Jun	Jul	Aug	Sep	Oct	Nov	Dec	Year
Record high °F (°C)	72 (22)	74 (23)	84 (29)	91 (33)	97 (36)	102 (39)	103 (39)	103 (39)	99 (37)	93 (34)	81 (27)	75 (24)	103 (39)
Mean maximum °F (°C)	55.4 (13.0)	58.7 (14.8)	72.1 (22.3)	80.9 (27.2)	84.1 (28.9)	90.1 (32.3)	91.1 (32.8)	90.6 (32.6)	86.3 (30.2)	79.2 (26.2)	69.6 (20.9)	58.0 (14.4)	92.2 (33.4)
Mean daily maximum °F (°C)	32.2 (0.1)	34.9 (1.6)	44.8 (7.1)	58.2 (14.6)	69.0 (20.6)	77.6 (25.3)	81.6 (27.6)	80.3 (26.8)	74.0 (23.3)	61.4 (16.3)	48.3 (9.1)	37.0 (2.8)	58.3 (14.6)
Daily mean °F (°C)	24.5 (−4.2)	26.4 (−3.1)	35.4 (1.9)	47.5 (8.6)	58.0 (14.4)	67.1 (19.5)	70.8 (21.6)	69.6 (20.9)	63.0 (17.2)	51.2 (10.7)	39.8 (4.3)	29.8 (−1.2)	48.6 (9.2)
Mean daily minimum °F (°C)	16.8 (−8.4)	17.9 (−7.8)	25.9 (−3.4)	36.7 (2.6)	47.0 (8.3)	56.7 (13.7)	60.1 (15.6)	58.8 (14.9)	52.0 (11.1)	41.0 (5.0)	31.4 (−0.3)	22.7 (−5.2)	38.9 (3.8)
Mean minimum °F (°C)	−3.5 (−19.7)	−0.4 (−18.0)	8.5 (−13.1)	21.6 (−5.8)	33.3 (0.7)	41.9 (5.5)	48.9 (9.4)	47.8 (8.8)	38.1 (3.4)	28.2 (−2.1)	17.9 (−7.8)	3.5 (−15.8)	−7.6 (−22.0)
Record low °F (°C)	−26 (−32)	−24 (−31)	−14 (−26)	3 (−16)	19 (−7)	28 (−2)	38 (3)	34 (1)	25 (−4)	16 (−9)	−2 (−19)	−22 (−30)	−26 (−32)
Average precipitation inches (mm)	2.88 (73)	2.23 (57)	3.08 (78)	3.71 (94)	4.04 (103)	4.26 (108)	4.14 (105)	3.58 (91)	3.38 (86)	3.37 (86)	2.95 (75)	2.93 (74)	40.55 (1,030)
Average snowfall inches (cm)	9.9 (25)	8.2 (21)	5.6 (14)	0.6 (1.5)	0.0 (0.0)	0.0 (0.0)	0.0 (0.0)	0.0 (0.0)	0.0 (0.0)	0.0 (0.0)	1.5 (3.8)	9.9 (25)	35.7 (90.3)
Average extreme snow depth inches (cm)	6.4 (16)	5.7 (14)	4.9 (12)	1.1 (2.8)	0.0 (0.0)	0.0 (0.0)	0.0 (0.0)	0.0 (0.0)	0.0 (0.0)	0.1 (0.25)	1.5 (3.8)	4.5 (11)	9.4 (24)
Average precipitation days (≥ 0.01 in)	16.7	12.5	13.2	14.6	13.6	11.4	10.9	9.5	10.2	11.6	12.3	15.2	151.7
Average snowy days (≥ 0.1 in)	6.2	4.4	3.0	0.3	0.0	0.0	0.0	0.0	0.0	0.1	1.1	3.6	18.7
Source 1: NOAA
Source 2: National Weather Service (mean maxima/minima, snow depth 1981–2010)

== Demographics ==
Historical population
Census	Pop.	Note	%±
1930	22		—
1940	42		90.9%
1950	107		154.8%
1960	210		96.3%
1970	341		62.4%
1980	245		−28.2%
1990	271		10.6%
2000	823		203.7%
2010	711		−13.6%
2020	654		−8.0%
2023 (est.)	661	▲	1.1%
U.S. Decennial Census

=== 2010 census ===
As of the census of 2010, there were 711 people, 311 households, and 188 families living in the village. The population density was 2,844.0 inhabitants per square mile (1,098.1/km^{2}). There were 404 housing units at an average density of 1,616.0 per square mile (623.9/km^{2}). The racial makeup of the village was 97.2% White, 0.6% African American, 0.3% Native American, 0.8% from other races, and 1.1% from two or more races. Hispanic or Latino of any race were 1.4% of the population.

There were 311 households, of which 26.4% had children under the age of 18 living with them, 43.1% were married couples living together, 10.9% had a female householder with no husband present, 6.4% had a male householder with no wife present, and 39.5% were non-families. 32.5% of all households were made up of individuals, and 11.9% had someone living alone who was 65 years of age or older. The average household size was 2.29 and the average family size was 2.89.

The median age in the village was 42.6 years. 19.7% of residents were under the age of 18; 8.7% were between the ages of 18 and 24; 25.1% were from 25 to 44; 33.8% were from 45 to 64; and 12.7% were 65 years of age or older. The gender makeup of the village was 51.2% male and 48.8% female.

=== 2000 census ===
As of the census of 2000, there were 823 people, 331 households, and 217 families living in the village. The population density was 3,035.2 inhabitants per square mile (1,171.9/km^{2}). There were 395 housing units at an average density of 1,456.8 per square mile (562.5/km^{2}). The racial makeup of the village was 99.03% White, 0.12% African American, 0.24% Asian, 0.24% from other races, and 0.36% from two or more races. Hispanic or Latino of any race were 0.61% of the population.

There were 331 households, out of which 31.4% had children under the age of 18 living with them, 50.8% were married couples living together, 10.0% had a female householder with no husband present, and 34.4% were non-families. 27.8% of all households were made up of individuals, and 6.0% had someone living alone who was 65 years of age or older. The average household size was 2.49 and the average family size was 3.07.

In the village, the population was spread out, with 24.9% under the age of 18, 8.0% from 18 to 24, 31.7% from 25 to 44, 26.2% from 45 to 64, and 9.1% who were 65 years of age or older. The median age was 37 years. For every 100 females there were 108.4 males. For every 100 females age 18 and over, there were 104.0 males.

The median income for a household in the village was $43,667, and the median income for a family was $49,531. Males had a median income of $40,000 versus $26,667 for females. The per capita income for the village was $19,115. About 5.4% of families and 9.2% of the population were below the poverty line, including 13.3% of those under age 18 and 4.4% of those age 65 or over.
