= Damned If You Do (NCIS) =

- NCIS episode
- Episode no.: Season 10; Episode 24
- Directed by: Tony Wharmby
- Written by: Gary Glasberg
- Original air date: May 14, 2013

Guest appearances
- Colin Hanks as DOD IG Investigator Richard Parsons; Alan Dale as Tom Morrow; John M. Jackson as Rear Admiral A. J. Chegwidden, JAGC, USN (Ret.); Muse Watson as Mike Franks; Joe Spano as Senior FBI Agent Tobias Fornell (uncredited); Allan Louis as Captain Wayne; Natalija Nogulich as Judge Maddox; Nicole DuPort as Emily McBride

Episode chronology
← Previous "Double Blind"	Next → "Whiskey Tango Foxtrot"
- NCIS season 10

"Damned If You Do" is the 24th and final episode of the tenth season of the American police procedural drama NCIS, and the 234th episode overall. It originally aired on CBS in the United States on May 14, 2013. The episode is written by Gary Glasberg and directed by Tony Wharmby, and was seen by 18.79 million viewers.

== Plot ==
In the aftermath of Gibbs' arrest (in "Double Blind"), the DoD Office of the Inspector General broadens their investigation into NCIS, placing the future of the entire agency in jeopardy. While the team believes that the investigating agent is looking to capitalize on Gibbs' arrest to make his career, they soon discover that NCIS' pursuit of Ilan Bodnar was used to cover up the CIA's involvement in the assassination of a foreign intelligence head; meanwhile, director Vance calls a lawyer for Gibbs, choosing former U.S. Navy JAG Rear Admiral A.J. Chegwidden (he retired years before, at the end of JAG's ninth season, about 2003 or 2004; since then, he began a career of attorney). Instead of letting Gibbs take all the blame for the charges, Tony, Ziva, and McGee take responsibility for what happened and resign. The episode ends with a cut to four months later, showing Gibbs aiming a sniper rifle at FBI agent Fornell. The scene fades to black, where the sound of a gunshot is then heard.

== Production ==
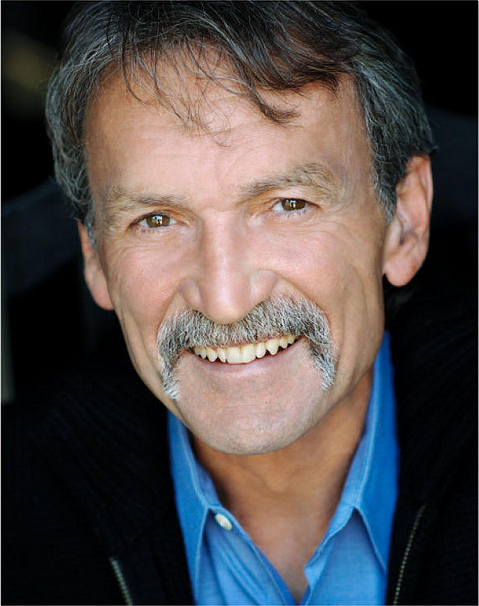
Muse Watson reprised his role as Mike Franks.

=== Writing ===
"Damned If You Do" was written by Gary Glasberg and directed by Tony Wharmby. The tenth-season finale had a "different" approach, which executive producer Gary Glasberg explained to be because "we did multiple [episodes] that could have been season-enders this season — the car crash, killing Ziva’s dad, the revenge factor of killing Bodnar. It was one thing after another and because of that, I wanted to do something different for the actual season finale." About the storyline in the episode, Glasberg said "One of the things we really started to think about was, 10 seasons into a show — 234 episodes — [there were] so many cases, so many opportunities and ways that Gibbs handled things but maybe crossed some lines in the way that he handled them. And someone had to have noticed that somewhere along the way. There are people who are paying attention and what if someone — an investigator who was out for his own reasons — decided that this was the opportunity and the moment to go after them and basically say, ‘You can’t keep doing this.’ Ziva going after Bodnar was just sort of the straw that broke the camel's back."

=== Casting ===
TVLine announced on April 12, 2013 the casting of John M. Jackson, who reprised his role as Rear Admiral AJ Chegwidden, a role Jackson portrayed on JAG for 9 seasons, including the "back-door" pilot episodes of NCIS in 2003. "We needed a lawyer, a really good lawyer, to assist Gibbs and the team in the finale", executive producer Gary Glasberg said about Chegwidden's return. On the same date, TV Guide announced Muse Watson's return as Mike Franks, a character who was murdered in the season 8 episode "Swan Song". "Gibbs is going to face some very tough decisions, […] and who better to help him than his best friend, Mike Franks. Imagine having a conscience, a moral compass, that speaks to you in the form of the wonderful Muse Watson", Glasberg explained. Colin Hanks continued his role as Department of Defense investigator Richard Parsons, introduced in the previous episode "Double Blind".

== Reception ==
=== Ratings ===
"Damned If You Do" was seen by 18.79 million live viewers following its broadcast on May 14, 2013, with a 3.4/10 share among adults aged 18 to 49. A rating point represents one percent of the total number of television sets in American households, and a share means the percentage of television sets in use tuned to the program. In total viewers, "Damned If You Do" easily won NCIS and CBS the night. The spin-off NCIS: Los Angeles drew second and was seen by 13.52 million viewers. Compared to the last episode "Double Blind", "Damned If You Do" was up in viewers and adults 18–49.

=== Critical reviews ===
Douglas Wolfe from TV Fanatic gave the episode 4.8/5 and stated that "This was such a fascinating and frustrating NCIS episode, all at once. The plot for "Damned If You Do" carried on from last week's tense beginning, with Inspector General investigator Richard Parsons gathering evidence in his efforts to have Gibbs indicted."

Kate O'Hare writing for Zap2it stated that "[The episode] showed why this series just keeps on going—it reveres its past while not being afraid to blow things up. [...] By the end of this labyrinth episode, Department of Defense Investigator—and apparently experienced blackmailer—Richard Parsons (Colin Hanks) fails, at least for the moment, in his quest to bury Gibbs under a pile of alleged misdeeds gleaned from reams of government documents."
