= 100 Women (film) =

American romantic comedy directed by Michael Davis

- Directed by: Michael Davis
- Written by: Michael Davis
- Produced by: Ehud Bleiberg; Richard Finney; Yitzhak Ginsberg; Terence Michael
- Starring: Chad Donella; Jennifer Morrison; Erinn Bartlett; Steve Monroe; Chene Lawson
- Cinematography: James Lawrence Spencer
- Edited by: Kevin D. Ross
- Music by: John Coda
- Production companies: Dream Entertainment; F.A.M.E. Film & Music Entertainment AG; Ehud Bleiberg/Yitzhak Ginsberg Productions; Michael/Finney Productions
- Distributed by: e-m-s the DVD-Company
- Release date: October 18, 2002; (Spain)
- Running time: 98 min.
- Country: United States
- Language: English

100 Women (also known as Girl Fever) is a 2002 American romantic comedy film written and directed by Michael Davis and starring Chad Donella, Erinn Bartlett, Jennifer Morrison, Clint Howard, and Steve Monroe. It tells the story of a young man named Sam and his struggle to discover why the girl of his dreams is suddenly depressed after her cheeriness brought him out of his sadness. The film was originally released under the title Girl Fever and had a short run in cinemas before being renamed 100 Women and being released to DVD. In 2000, Davis directed a film called 100 Girls with a very similar theme.

== Plot ==
The film starts with a man surrounded by a large number of angry-looking women in a theater. He tells his story and narrates it throughout the film.

Sam, an art student who describes himself as "accidentally funny", is having the worst day of his life: he loses his girlfriend, fails art school, and is put down by his favorite professor. Finally, his art portfolio falls open, and his drawings scatter. A girl comes up with one drawing (a smiling face) and says he has "lost his smile". The girl is Hope, a bubbly bombshell with a drive to make Sam smile again. She eventually does, and they kiss in the rain. She gives Sam her number and then is picked up by a friend. Unfortunately for Sam, the rain washes the number off of his hand.

Devastated, he is determined to search for her. He takes a job as a delivery boy at his uncle's coffee shop. He is fruitless at first. Then finally, he delivers to Hope's apartment in a women's residence. She comes to the door in tears, not at all the way Sam remembers her. She refuses to talk about her pain and hurries Sam away. Now Sam gives himself a new task: find out how Hope "lost her smile" and give it back to her.

While trying to cheer her up, he meets various people in the building: Tanya - a junior reporter devoted to herself and her career; Gretchen - his piercing-obsessed ex-girlfriend; Mr. Willens - the disgusting, unhygienic and lecherous building manager; and finally Annie - an ex-chocoholic who has lost a lot of weight and agrees to assist him in his search. Along the way, he takes advice from his cousin Holden, an overweight sex addict whose pornography obsession has left him to graduate to the hardest of hardcore magazines in the world.

While on his search, he is harassed by a mystery girl who wants him to give up. She drops a vase near him and sticks him and Holden penis-to-penis in a Chinese finger trap. She leaves an imprint in wet plaster that shows a scar on her butt. He then sets out to find the girl with that scar. Investigating Hope's room on subsequent trips, he finds a torn album cover and a sad note in Hope's diary. Further investigating both, leads him nowhere.

Along the way, he begins to fall in love with Annie. When Hope is served with an eviction notice, Sam sits outside her door drawing. Annie comes up and they talk for a while. He makes her laugh with faces drawn on various body parts. They kiss and start a relationship. She ends it quickly, however, as he refuses to stop trying to help Hope, seeing it as the duty of a friend.

Sam then goes to Hope's room one last time. She thanks him for his help and kisses him. He then finds the scar on her butt - she was the mystery woman with the help and encouragement of Annie. She tells him what happened. The night they first met, her friend Jesse picked her up. They have known each other since childhood and were best friends. But then he tried to force himself on her, saying that guys don't want girls as friends, they only want girlfriends. She escaped through the sunroof, cutting her butt in the process. Sam and Hope get together. Annie consoles her and says she will help her find out if Sam is a true friend.

Later, Hope notices that Sam has once again lost his smile. He feels bad about Hope and Annie tricking him and for hurting Annie. Annie won't speak to him and has turned to chocolate, her comfort food. Hope realizes he loves Annie too, and says he should figure out which one he wants to be with. Looking at his drawings of the two, he realizes that the smiling face he always drew was Annie, his one true love. She still refuses to talk to him. Sam takes his drawings to make a cartoon for her. Willens, who Sam had turned in for peeping on the residents, scatters them. All the residents help him pick them up, showing their love for him.

Sam then displays his cartoon of their relationship to her from her window. Hope tells Annie to realize that Sam loves her and that she loves him. She takes a while but comes around and laughs raucously at the bizarre antics of their characters. Sam runs to her apartment and she jumps into his arms.

== Cast ==
- Chad Donella as Sam
- Jennifer Morrison as Annie
- Erinn Bartlett as Hope
- Steve Monroe as Holden
- Chene Lawson as Tanya
- Juleah Weikel as Gretchen
- A. J. Buckley as Jesse
- Clint Howard as Mr. Willems
- Dublin James as Jason
- Crystal Kwon as Prankster

== Reception ==
=== Home media ===
100 Women was released on DVD on April 29, 2003 by Artisan Entertainment.

=== Critical response ===
2020 Movie Reviews gave the film a negative review, stating: "Any theory that the law of diminishing returns refers as much to the creative as the fiscal rewards offered by sequels/follow-ups is amply supported by back-to-back viewings of Girl Fever, and its predecessor, 100 Girls (2000) — which was itself no better than average. While the effort put into the script of the earlier movie by writer/director Michael Davis was evident, this effort — which is little more than a remake — appears to have been the lazy compromise of a man reheating an overcooked feast." Ryan McDonald from Shameless Self Expression gave 100 Women a C rating, concluding: "Still maybe worth a look if you’re desperate, simply because I believe Bartlett should be a star- she’s that charismatic and appealing (Morrison ain’t half bad either, but seriously look at her and tell me she’s not Larisa Oleynik’s twin!)."
