= Randy Couture =

American Greco-Roman wrestler and mixed martial artist

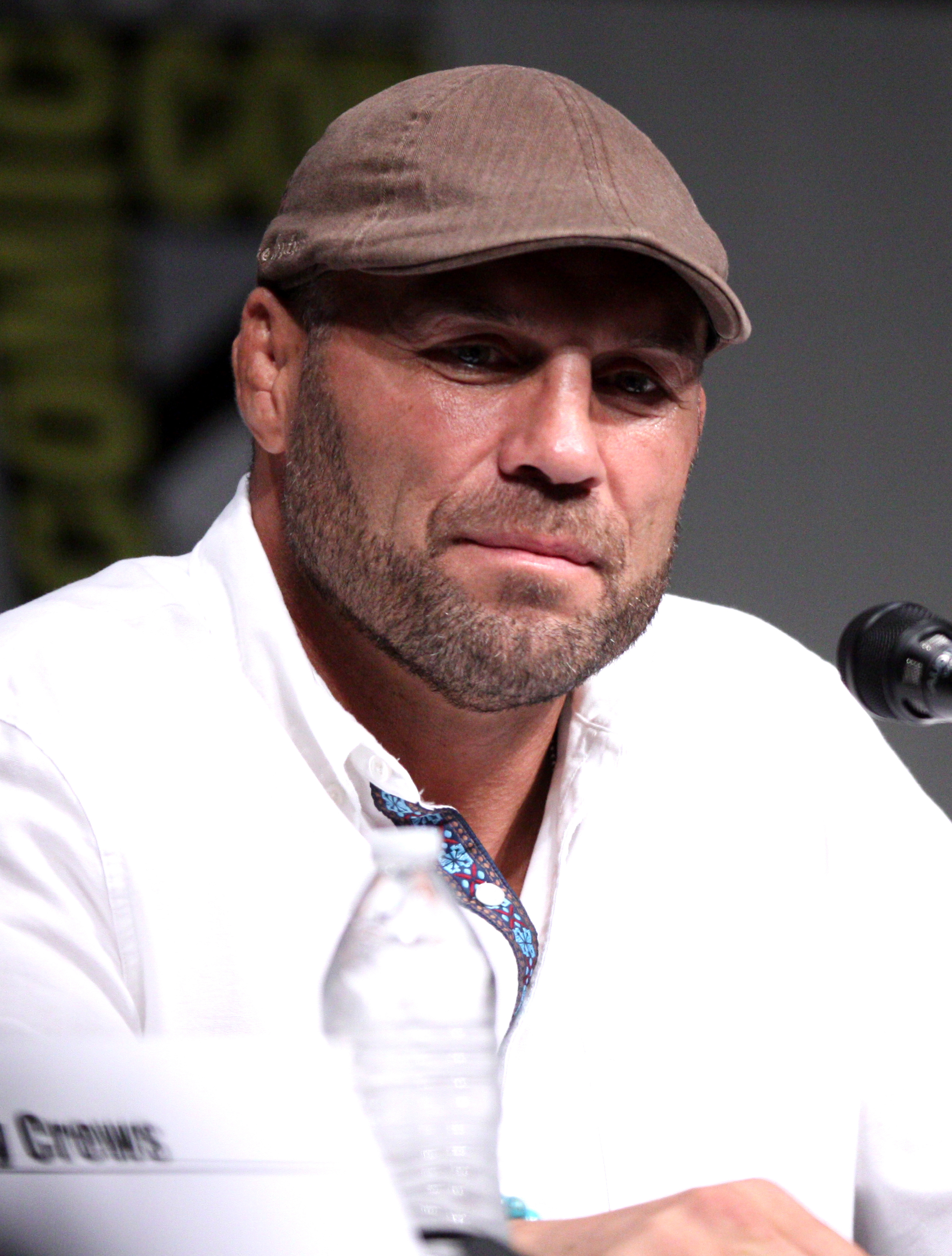
- Couture in 2012
- Born: Randy Duane Couture; June 22, 1963 (age 63); Everett, Washington, U.S.
- Other names: The Natural
- Height: 6 ft 1 in (185 cm)
- Weight: 203 lb (92 kg; 14 st 7 lb)
- Division: Light Heavyweight (2003–2006; 2009–2011); Heavyweight (1997–2003; 2007–2009; 2010)
- Reach: 75 in (191 cm)
- Style: Greco-Roman wrestling
- Fighting out of: Corvallis, Oregon, U.S.
- Team: Team Quest (1999–2006); Xtreme Couture (2006–2011)
- Rank: Black belt in Neil Melanson's Submission wrestling System
- Wrestling: NCAA Division I Wrestling; Olympic Alternate Greco-Roman wrestling
- Years active: 1997–2011

Mixed martial arts record
- Total: 30
- Wins: 19
- By knockout: 7
- By submission: 4
- By decision: 8
- Losses: 11
- By knockout: 7
- By submission: 3
- By decision: 1

Other information
- University: Oklahoma State University
- Notable relatives: Ryan Couture (son)
- Notable school: Lynnwood High School
- Website: randycouture.com
- Mixed martial arts record from Sherdog
Medal record
Men's Greco-Roman Wrestling
Representing the United States
Pan American Games
Gold medal – first place	1991 Havana	90 kg
Pan American Championships
Gold medal – first place	1991 Havana	90 kg
Silver medal – second place	1990 Colorado Springs	90 kg
Silver medal – second place	1992 Albany	90 kg
Silver medal – second place	1998 Winnipeg	97 kg
Bronze medal – third place	1997 San Juan	97 kg
World Cup
Bronze medal – third place	1991 Toledo	90 kg
Bronze medal – third place	1992 Moscow	90 kg
Collegiate Wrestling
Representing the Oklahoma State Cowboys
NCAA Division I Championships
Silver medal – second place	1991 Iowa City	190 lb
Silver medal – second place	1992 Oklahoma City	190 lb
- Military career
- Allegiance: United States
- Branch: United States Army
- Service years: 1982–1988
- Rank: Sergeant
- Unit: 101st Airborne Division
- Other work: Professional mixed martial arts

Randy Duane Couture (/koʊˈtʊər/; born June 22, 1963) is an American mixed martial arts commentator, actor, former United States Army sergeant, former professional mixed martial artist, and former collegiate and Greco-Roman wrestler. During his tenures in the Ultimate Fighting Championship (UFC), he became a three-time UFC Heavyweight Champion, two-time UFC Light Heavyweight Champion, an interim UFC Light Heavyweight Champion, making him a six-time UFC Champion and the UFC 13 Heavyweight Tournament winner. He is the first fighter in history to win a UFC championship in two different divisions. As of 2025, he serves as a commentator and analyst for the Professional Fighters League.

Couture has competed in 15 title fights. He is tied for the record for the most wins in UFC Heavyweight Championship bouts (6) with former UFC Heavyweight champion Stipe Miocic. He had the most title reigns in the UFC, with six. His last fight with Lyoto Machida marked his 24th fight in the UFC. He is the fourth member of the UFC Hall of Fame. He is one of only two fighters over the age of 40 to have won a UFC championship fight, having done so four times. He is one of the few MMA champions to regain a title he had lost, and the only to have done it three times (twice at heavyweight, once at light heavyweight).

Couture was an Olympic wrestling alternate and has lived in Corvallis, Oregon throughout much of his career, where he served as an assistant wrestling coach and a strength and conditioning coach for Oregon State University. He established Team Quest with Matt Lindland and Dan Henderson, a training camp for fighters, based out of Gresham, Oregon, and headed by coach Robert Folis. In 2005, he moved to Las Vegas, where he opened his own extensive chain of gyms under the name Xtreme Couture. He partnered with Bas Rutten to open Legends Gym in Hollywood, California.

Couture is generally recognized as a clinch and ground-and-pound fighter who uses his wrestling ability to execute takedowns, establish top position and successively strike the opponent on the bottom. He has displayed a variety of skills in boxing and catch wrestling. He is the only UFC fighter to win a championship after becoming a Hall-of-Famer and is the oldest champion in MMA history at age 45.

== Background ==
Couture was born in Everett, Washington, the son of Sharan Amelia (née King) and Edward Lewis "Ed" Couture. He wrestled at Lynnwood High School in Lynnwood, Washington, where he won a state championship during his senior year in wrestling. Afterwards he served in the U.S. Army from 1982 to 1988, attaining the rank of Sergeant in the 101st Airborne, where he "wrestled and did a little boxing."

While he was in the Army he applied for tryouts with the U.S. Army freestyle wrestling team; however, due to a clerical error his application was sent to the Greco-Roman wrestling tryouts and rather than wait until the next year he decided to pursue it. Despite never having competed in Greco-Roman he made the team. He went on to win the U.S. Army Europe title and made the All-Army team.

Upon discharge, Couture became a three-time Olympic team alternate (1988, 1992 and 1996), a semifinalist at the 2000 Olympic Trials, a three-time NCAA Division I All-American and a two-time NCAA Division I runner-up (1991 and 1992) at Oklahoma State University. In 1992, he was the Division I runner-up at 190 pounds (86 kg), coming in second after Mark Kerr. From 1989 to 1992 he accumulated a collegiate wrestling record of 113-42. He graduated from Oklahoma State University with a bachelor's degree in literature.

== Mixed martial arts career ==
=== Ultimate Fighting Championship and RINGS ===
Being called to the tournament as an alternate on three weeks' notice, Couture made his professional mixed martial arts debut at UFC 13 on May 30, 1997, as part of a four-man heavyweight tournament. His first opponent was Tony Halme, who outweighed him by nearly 100 pounds (45 kg; 7.1 st). Couture immediately hit a double-leg takedown and, after some ground and pound, moved to back mount and secured a rear naked choke submission to win in under a minute. In the tournament final, he defeated Steven Graham, another larger opponent (290 lb), by TKO at 3:13 into the first round.

On October 17, 1997, at UFC 15, Couture fought Vitor Belfort to determine the number one contender for the UFC Heavyweight Championship. Couture was an underdog, as 19-year-old Belfort was the UFC 12 Heavyweight Tournament Champion, winning all of his matches with devastating punches. After circling away from Belfort's left hand, Couture got the clinch. The fighters broke up and, when Belfort attempted a flurry of punches, Couture hit a takedown. He immediately gained side control and landed strikes. As Belfort scrambled to his feet, Couture landed knee strikes. He clinched again and wore Belfort down with dirty boxing. By the 7-minute mark, Belfort was exhausted. Couture again took him down, and finished him with punches from back mount, for one of the biggest upsets in MMA at the time.

At UFC Japan on December 21, Couture challenged the UFC Heavyweight Champion, Maurice Smith to his second title defense since winning the belt from Mark Coleman earlier that year. It was a slow-paced fight, and neither fighter significantly damaged the other, but Couture hit several takedowns and held positional control throughout the fight. After 21 minutes, he won a majority decision and became the new UFC Heavyweight Champion. Though this win was controversial as many believe Smith did enough to win the fight.

In 1998, UFC matchmakers wanted Couture to defend the belt against Bas Rutten, former King of Pancrase. Couture instead signed with Vale Tudo Japan, and was stripped of the title. He had his first and only match against Shooto veteran and grappling specialist Enson Inoue. After taking the fight to the ground, Couture tapped out to an armbar, just over 90 seconds into the bout.

Still in Japan, Couture was signed up with Fighting Network RINGS, debuting against Mikhail Illoukhine on March 20, 1999, in RINGS. Couture submitted to a kimura, though the loss was controversial due to Illoukhine locking the hold while they were being re-positioned on the center of the ring. After that loss, he took a break from MMA to focus on his amateur wrestling career.

Couture returned to MMA in October 2000, for the RINGS King of Kings Tournament 2000. He won a unanimous decision over UFC veteran Jeremy Horn in his first fight, and then another over Pancrase veteran Ryūshi Yanagisawa. These two wins qualified him for the final event of the tournament, in March 2001. Before that, he was offered a shot at the UFC Heavyweight Championship against Kevin Randleman on November 17, 2000. He was taken down in the first two rounds, but defended well from his back, negating most of Randleman's ground and pound attempts. In the third round, he tripped Randleman to the mat and landed several strikes from full mount for a TKO victory and his second UFC Heavyweight Championship.

In February 2001, Couture continued in the RINGS King of Kings Tournament 2000 Final. After winning an even decision over veteran Tsuyoshi Kohsaka in the first fight, he got caught in a guillotine choke by Valentijn Overeem after committing himself in a takedown and had to submit. Antônio Rodrigo Nogueira won the tournament, and Couture returned to the UFC.

His first title defense was against Brazilian kickboxer Pedro Rizzo, at UFC 31. This was the first UFC event under Zuffa management, with Dana White as the new president. Both fighters inflicted substantial damage. After five 5-minute rounds, Couture won a close unanimous decision. Some fans felt Rizzo had won, so the UFC set up an immediate rematch for UFC 34, in November 2001. This time, Couture won decisively by TKO in the third round.

His third title defense was in March 2002, against up-and-comer Josh Barnett. In the second round, Barnett mounted Couture and landed several strikes to win the title by TKO. After the fight, it was revealed Barnett had tested positive for anabolic steroids. He was subsequently stripped of the title and cut from the UFC.

Couture then faced Ricco Rodriguez for the vacant UFC Heavyweight Championship at UFC 39, in late 2002. After dominating the first three rounds, 39-year-old Couture became noticeably fatigued. In the fifth round, Rodriguez took him down and landed an elbow strike to his orbital bone, breaking it and making him submit. This was the first time a UFC fight had finished in the fifth round.

==== Move to light heavyweight and trilogy with Chuck Liddell ====
After two consecutive losses to larger opponents in the heavyweight division, Couture moved down to the light heavyweight division. In his light heavyweight debut, he fought long-time number one contender Chuck Liddell for the UFC Interim Light heavyweight Championship. He was again the underdog but, after outstriking Liddell for three rounds, took the fight to the ground and won by TKO via strikes from full mount, becoming the first UFC fighter to win titles in two weight classes.

His next match, against five-time defending champion Tito Ortiz, was billed as a "Champion vs. Champion" fight. 40-year-old Couture won a unanimous decision to become the undisputed UFC Light heavyweight Champion.

Couture's first title defense was against Vitor Belfort, whom he had previously defeated in 1997 at UFC 15. In the first round, as Couture closed the distance to attempt a clinch, Belfort grazed his right eye with a left hook. His glove opened a cut, and Belfort was declared the winner when the cageside doctor advised the fight be stopped. A rubber match took place later that year. Couture dominated all three rounds before winning by doctor stoppage due to a cut, and became a two-time UFC Light heavyweight Champion.

On April 16, 2005, in a rematch with Liddell, Couture lost his title and suffered the first knockout loss of his career. He came back in August to defeat Mike van Arsdale and reestablish himself as a top contender. He faced Liddell for the third and final time in a championship match at UFC 57, on February 4, 2006. He was knocked out in the second round and, immediately afterwards, announced his retirement from MMA.

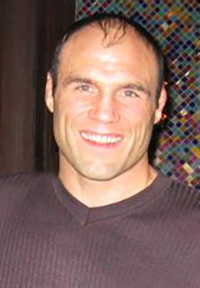
Couture in 2005

On June 24, 2006, on The Ultimate Fighter 3 Finale, Couture became the fourth inductee to the UFC Hall of Fame, joining Royce Gracie, Dan Severn, and Ken Shamrock.

==== Retirement ====
After retiring from MMA, Couture became a regular broadcast commentator for UFC events and co-host of Before the Bell and After the Bell on The Fight Network. He appeared in the Rob Schneider movie Big Stan, with fellow mixed martial artists Don Frye and Bob Sapp.

On November 17, 2006, Couture fought and drew with Brazilian jiu-jitsu champion Ronaldo "Jacare" Souza in a submission wrestling contest. After the match Couture invited Souza to train at his gym. Souza accepted and started training at Xtreme Couture in Las Vegas.

Couture was featured in the season two premiere episode of the Spike TV show Pros vs. Joes, which aired January 25, 2007. His teammates on the episode were Michael Irvin, Kevin Willis, and José Canseco. He returned for the finale, where he took part in a football-based round. His teammates were Willis, Randall Cunningham, Bruce Smith, Roy Jones Jr., and Tim Hardaway.

==== Reclaiming the Heavyweight Championship ====
Couture now trains at his own gym, Xtreme Couture.

On January 11, 2007, Couture announced his return from retirement in an interview on the Spike TV magazine show, "Inside the UFC". In a conversation with Joe Rogan, he confirmed he would face Tim Sylvia for the UFC Heavyweight Championship at UFC 68, on March 3, 2007. He also announced he had signed a four-fight, two-year deal with the UFC.

At the age of 43, Couture defeated Sylvia by unanimous decision to become UFC Heavyweight Champion for a third time (a UFC record). Couture's first punch, eight seconds into the fight, sent the 6 ft 8 in (2.03 m) Sylvia to the mat. He controlled the pace of the fight for five rounds, smothering Sylvia with strikes and numerous takedowns. All three judges scored the bout 50–45 for Couture.

At UFC 74 on August 25, 2007, Couture successfully defended the title against Brazilian Gabriel Gonzaga, defeating him via TKO by strikes. This fight earned him a Fight of the Night award. Couture suffered a broken left arm when he blocked one of Gonzaga's kicks. The kick cleanly split his ulna, requiring him to wear a splint for six weeks.

==== Resignation and dispute with the UFC ====
On October 11, 2007, Couture announced he was severing all ties with the UFC, leaving two contracted fights, a position as an on-air analyst and the UFC Heavyweight Championship behind. He received $250,000 (plus $936,000 of PPV revenue) for his comeback fight with Tim Sylvia. He received a $250,000 purse for defeating Gabriel Gonzaga (plus a $35,000 "Fight of the Night" bonus and $787,000 in PPV revenue). He complained Chuck Liddell was allegedly paid more than he was, despite losing his previous two fights. Couture cited the UFC's failure to sign #1 ranked Heavyweight fighter Fedor Emelianenko, as well as disputes with UFC management, for his decision.

==== Transition from fighter to coach ====
On October 18, 2007, UFC president Dana White said Couture remained the UFC Heavyweight Champion despite his plans to quit, and reiterated he would not release Couture from the final two fights on his contract. Couture held a press conference on October 25, 2007, where he denied his departure from UFC was a "retirement", set forth his grievances about his pay, and reiterated his belief that he would be free from any contractual obligations to the UFC after nine months.

On October 30, 2007, White and Zuffa CEO Lorenzo Fertitta held another press conference, where White reiterated the UFC's position of twelve days prior, and released documents refuting Couture's claims about the pay he received.

They met again on Thanksgiving weekend to discuss a possible UFC return, but Couture said he had no desire to do so at the time.

Cornering some of his fighters from Xtreme Couture at HDNet Fights on December 15 in Dallas, Couture answered questions about Fedor Emelianenko, stating that he would like to fight him in October, once his UFC contract expired, if the UFC could not come to a co-promotion agreement with Russia's M-1 Global beforehand.

On January 15, 2008, Zuffa filed a lawsuit in Clark County District Court in Nevada, citing breach of contract and irreparable damage, seeking over $10,000 in damages. This suit only concerned Couture's employment contract and not his promotional contract. On February 28, 2008, Judge Jennifer Togliatti handed down the first ruling in the case, issuing a preliminary injunction barring Couture from participating in an IFL event held the following day.

On August 2, 2008, a Texas appeals court granted Zuffa's request for a stay against a motion for a declaratory judgment in a suit filed by HDNet regarding Couture's contractual status with the UFC. The stay effectively ended the dispute in the state of Texas, and Zuffa was allowed to move forward with the Nevada suit.

==== Return to the UFC ====
On September 2, 2008, the UFC announced it had signed Couture to a new three-fight contract. On November 15, he returned at UFC 91 in Las Vegas, Nevada, where he lost the UFC Heavyweight Championship to Brock Lesnar. After a close first round, Lesnar knocked Couture down in the second round and struck him with hammerfists for a TKO victory at 3:07. In a post-fight interview with Joe Rogan, Couture declared his desire to keep fighting and said he felt he was still becoming a better fighter, blaming the loss on his performance, not his age.

On August 29, 2009, Couture faced former UFC Interim Heavyweight Champion and former PRIDE Heavyweight Champion Antônio Rodrigo Nogueira at UFC 102 in Portland, Oregon, and lost by unanimous decision (30–27, 30–27, and 29–28). After the bout, Couture stated he felt he was in the best shape of his life, and would wait and see what the UFC had in store for him. The fight received the "Fight of the Night" award.

==== Return to light heavyweight and retirement ====
After the Nogueira loss, Couture signed a new six-fight deal, which superseded his previous contract.

On November 14, 2009, at UFC 105, Couture faced Brandon Vera. Vera landed effective strikes and scored a takedown, but Couture won a somewhat controversial unanimous decision. The fight was his first at Light heavyweight since losing to Chuck Liddell in 2006. With the win, the 46-year-old Couture became the oldest fighter to win a UFC bout.

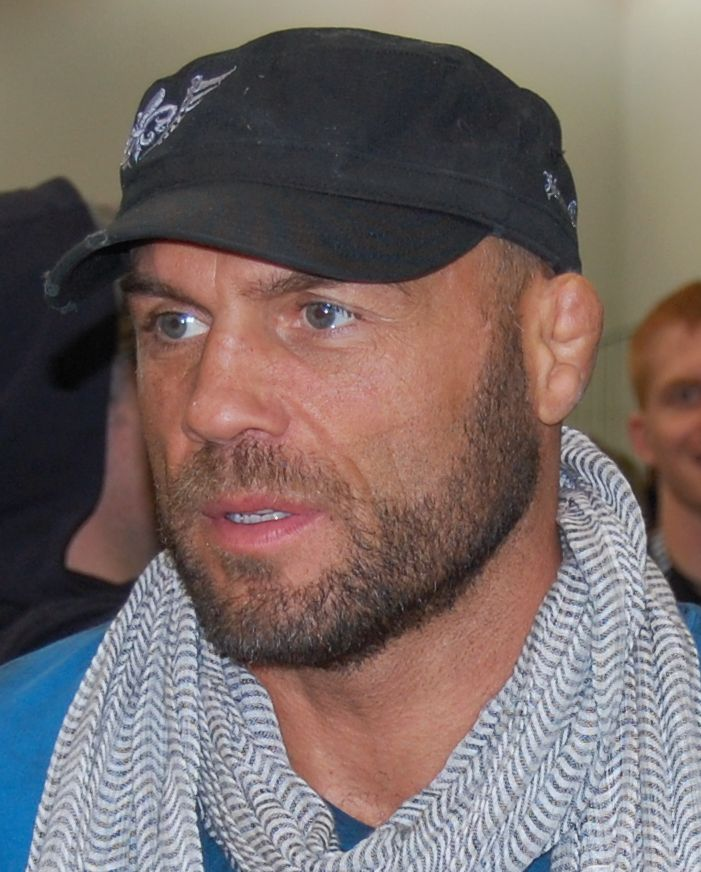
At the Arnold Sports Festival for WEC 47 on March 6, 2010

Couture fought fellow UFC Hall of Famer Mark Coleman at UFC 109. The bout marked the first time UFC Hall of Famers fought each other in the UFC. They were scheduled to meet at UFC 17 in 1998, but an injury to Couture forced the cancellation of the bout. They wrestled each other in a freestyle match at the 1989 Olympic Festival at Oklahoma State University; Coleman won the match by one point. Couture modified his training for this bout, focusing on catch wrestling and refining his boxing under coach Gil Martinez. The combined age of these fighters (91) is the highest in any UFC match. Couture made Coleman pass out to a rear-naked choke submission in the second round, getting his first submission win in over four years.

Couture was scheduled to fight Rich Franklin at UFC 115, but Franklin instead fought Chuck Liddell, replacing Liddell's original opponent, Tito Ortiz. Couture instead faced three-time boxing world champion James Toney at UFC 118. Couture dominated Toney, taking him down and mounting him within seconds, and quickly making him submit to an arm triangle choke. The match achieved notoriety, though it drew criticisms of being a freak show fight, among them by UFC President Dana White himself. Many also felt that this fight had been made as an attempt to repair damage done to the credibility of MMA after Ray Mercer knocked out former UFC Heavyweight Champion Tim Sylvia.

Couture had stated he was interested in fighting either Lyoto Machida or Maurício Rua (in a non-title bout). Since Rua had an upcoming title defense against Jon Jones, UFC matchmakers gave him Machida. They fought on April 30, 2011, at UFC 129, before 55,000 fans in Toronto. Couture had stated before the bout it would be his final fight. Machida knocked him out in the second round with a jumping front kick. After the fight, Couture announced he was "finally done fighting", at the age of 47.

=== Bellator Fighting Championships ===
On January 29, 2013, Couture signed with Bellator to be a coach in the first season of their reality show, Fight Master: Bellator MMA which debuted in June 2013. Couture also did commentary for Bellator 96.

== Acting ==
Couture made a cameo appearance in the direct-to-video Steven Seagal film Today You Die and on the season finale of the CBS show The Unit, as a military guard. He played fight commentator Terry Flynn in the film Redbelt. He appeared on an episode of The History Channel show Human Weapon on September 27, 2007, and starred in the 2008 film The Scorpion King 2: Rise of a Warrior. He played Toll Road in the 2010 movie The Expendables and reprised the role in the 2012, 2014 and 2023 sequels. He did several public service announcements, one against crystal meth. He starred alongside 50 Cent and Bruce Willis in the 2011 film, Setup, as an enforcer named Petey.

In 2012, he played the leading role of hard-bitten cop Paul Ross in Brandon Nutt's action film Hijacked, alongside Dominic Purcell.

On September 4, 2014, it was announced that Couture would be one of the celebrities competing on the 19th season of Dancing with the Stars. He paired with professional dancer Karina Smirnoff. The couple was eliminated on the third week of competition finishing in eleventh place.

Couture appeared in four episodes of the TV series Hawaii Five-0 as Jason Duclair.

Couture appeared on Impractical Jokers as a guest during Sal Vulcano's punishment in the episode "Pantsing with the Stars". In that episode, Vulcano, who refused an instruction during a challenge where he was posing as a Krav Maga instructor, was given a surprise punishment by the other Jokers in that he then had to wrestle Couture and attempt to "pants" him.

In 2019, Couture starred alongside Luke Goss and Michael Jai White in the movie The Hard Way, which was among the most popular watched movies on Netflix. He also appeared in the film Outlaw Johnny Black.

In July 2019, Couture appeared on an episode of the Outdoor Channel show Gunnytime entitled "Teamwork Makes the Dream Work".

In June 2025, Couture starred alongside Jennifer Esposito and Tommy Davidson in the movie F Plus.

== Personal life ==
Couture was previously married to Sharon, Tricia, and Kim Couture (née Borrego). He and Kim filed for divorce in May 2009. He continued to coach her and support her MMA career. He has three children, including Aimee, Ryan, and Caden "Cooter" Couture as well as four grandchildren. He often worked with and was the long-term partner of Mindy Robinson from 2014 to 2025.They ended their relationship in 2025. Randy is currently in a partnership with Lisa Guarasci.

Asked if MMA could be improved, he suggested health insurance, retirement plans as well as more equal compensation regarding other athletes and sports. He lives in Las Vegas. He enjoys hunting.

In 2012, Couture was inducted into the International Sports Hall of Fame (ISHOF) presented by sports legend Dr. Robert M. Goldman. In 2018, he was inducted into the National Wrestling Hall of Fame and was an Outstanding American honoree.

On October 23, 2019, Couture suffered a heart attack after training and walked himself to a nearby hospital. Following a successful operation, Couture made a full recovery.

Following a racing crash accident in July 2025, Couture had to be airlifted to a hospital with first and second-degree burns. He was discharged shortly thereafter.

== Championships and accomplishments ==
=== Greco-Roman wrestling ===
- Pan American Games
  - Pan American Championship Greco-Roman Seniors 90 kg – second place (June 13, 1990)
  - Pan American Championship Greco-Roman Seniors 90 kg – winner (January 1, 1991)
  - Pan American Championship Greco-Roman Seniors 90 kg – second place (January 1, 1992)
  - Pan American Championship Greco-Roman Seniors 97 kg – third place (May 21, 1997)
  - Pan American Championship Greco-Roman Seniors 97 kg – second place (March 24, 1998)
  - Pan American Games Greco-Roman Seniors 90 kg – winner (August 6, 1991)
- FILA Wrestling World Championships
  - FILA test tournament Greco-Roman Seniors 97 kg – third place (March 14, 1998)
  - FILA World Cup Greco-Roman Seniors 90 kg – third place (November 9, 1991)
  - FILA World Cup Greco-Roman Seniors 90 kg – third place (November 21, 1992)

=== Collegiate wrestling ===
- National Collegiate Athletic Association
  - NCAA Division I All-American (1990, 1991, 1992)
  - NCAA Division I 190 lb/86.4 kg – 6th place out of Oklahoma State University (1990)
  - NCAA Division I 190 lb/86.4 kg – Runner-up out of Oklahoma State University (1991)
  - NCAA Division I 190 lb/86.4 kg – Runner-up out of Oklahoma State University (1992)

=== Mixed martial arts ===
- Ultimate Fighting Championship
  - UFC Hall of Fame (Pioneer Wing, Class of 2006)
  - UFC 13 Heavyweight Tournament Champion
  - UFC Heavyweight Championship (3 times)
    - Three successful title defenses overall
      - Two successful title defenses (second reign)
      - One successful title defense (third reign)
    - UFC Light Heavyweight Championship (Two times)
    - Interim UFC Light Heavyweight Championship (One time)
    - First multi-divisional champion in UFC history
    - First & only fighter that was a multi-divisional champion that won back the title after losing it (2x at Heavyweight & 1x at Light Heavyweight)
    - Tied (Georges St-Pierre) for second most championship fights in UFC history (15)
    - Most championship reigns in UFC history (6)
    - Tied (Tim Sylvia & Stipe Miocic) for most heavyweight title bouts in UFC history (9)
    - Oldest fighter to be a champion in UFC history (45 years, 4 months; 16,583 days)
    - Oldest fighter to win a championship in UFC history (43 years 255 days)
    - Tied (Matt Hughes, Chuck Liddell & T.J. Dillashaw) for third most knockouts in UFC title fights (5)
    - Oldest fighter to defend a championship successfully (44 years Old)
  - UFC Viewer's Choice Award
  - Fight of the Night (Two times) vs. Gabriel Gonzaga and Antônio Rodrigo Nogueira
  - UFC Encyclopedia Awards
    - Fight of the Night (Eight times) vs. Vitor Belfort 1, Kevin Randleman, Pedro Rizzo, Josh Barnett, Ricco Rodriguez, Chuck Liddell 1, Tito Ortiz and Chuck Liddell 3
      - Tied (Tito Ortiz) for most Encyclopedia Fight of the Night Awards (8)
    - Submission of the Night (One time) vs. Mike van Arsdale
  - Most PPV main event bouts in UFC history (18)
  - Oldest fighter to win a bout in UFC history (47 years, 68 days)
  - UFC.com Awards
    - 2007: Ranked #3 Fighter of the Year, Ranked #9 Upset of the Year vs. Tim Sylvia & Ranked #9 Fight of the Year vs. Tim Sylvia
    - 2009: Ranked #2 Fight of the Year vs. Antônio Rodrigo Nogueira
- ESPN
  - #7 Ranked Men's MMA Fighter of the 21st Century
- Black Belt Magazine
  - 1997 Full-Contact Competitor of the Year
  - Black Belt Magazine Hall of Famer
- George Tragos/Lou Thesz Professional Wrestling Hall of Fame
  - 2013 George Tragos Award
- Martial Arts History Museum Hall of Fame
  - Class of 2008
- MMA Fighting
  - 2003 Light Heavyweight Fighter of the Year
- Inside Fights
  - 2009 Fight of the Year – vs. Antônio Rodrigo Nogueira on August 29
- Wrestling Observer Newsletter
  - 2001 Fight of the Year vs. Pedro Rizzo on May 4
  - 2003 Most Outstanding Fighter
  - 2007 MMA Most Valuable Fighter
  - MMA Most Valuable Fighter of the Decade (2000s)
- World MMA Awards
  - 2010 Outstanding Contribution to MMA Award
- Fight Matrix
  - 1997 Rookie of the Year
- United States Athletics Hall of Fame
  - Class of 2025

== Mixed martial arts record ==
Professional record breakdown
30 matches	19 wins	11 losses
By knockout	7	7
By submission	4	3
By decision	8	1

Res.	Record	Opponent	Method	Event	Date	Round	Time	Location	Notes
Loss	19–11	Lyoto Machida	KO (front kick)	UFC 129	April 30, 2011	2	1:05	Toronto, Ontario, Canada	Retired after bout.
Win	19–10	James Toney	Submission (arm-triangle choke)	UFC 118	August 28, 2010	1	3:19	Boston, Massachusetts, United States	Heavyweight bout.
Win	18–10	Mark Coleman	Submission (rear-naked choke)	UFC 109	February 6, 2010	2	1:09	Las Vegas, Nevada, United States	First ever UFC Hall of Famer vs. UFC Hall of Famer bout in UFC history.
Win	17–10	Brandon Vera	Decision (unanimous)	UFC 105	November 14, 2009	3	5:00	Manchester, United Kingdom	Return to Light Heavyweight.
Loss	16–10	Antônio Rodrigo Nogueira	Decision (unanimous)	UFC 102	August 29, 2009	3	5:00	Portland, Oregon, United States	Fight of the Night.
Loss	16–9	Brock Lesnar	TKO (punches)	UFC 91	November 15, 2008	2	3:07	Las Vegas, Nevada, United States	Lost the UFC Heavyweight Championship.
Win	16–8	Gabriel Gonzaga	TKO (punches)	UFC 74	August 25, 2007	3	1:37	Las Vegas, Nevada, United States	Defended the UFC Heavyweight Championship. Fight of the Night.
Win	15–8	Tim Sylvia	Decision (unanimous)	UFC 68	March 3, 2007	5	5:00	Columbus, Ohio, United States	Return to Heavyweight. Won the UFC Heavyweight Championship.
Loss	14–8	Chuck Liddell	KO (punch)	UFC 57	February 4, 2006	2	1:28	Las Vegas, Nevada, United States	For the UFC Light Heavyweight Championship.
Win	14–7	Mike van Arsdale	Submission (anaconda choke)	UFC 54	August 20, 2005	3	0:52	Las Vegas, Nevada, United States	
Loss	13–7	Chuck Liddell	KO (punches)	UFC 52	April 16, 2005	1	2:06	Las Vegas, Nevada, United States	Lost the UFC Light Heavyweight Championship.
Win	13–6	Vitor Belfort	TKO (doctor stoppage)	UFC 49	August 21, 2004	3	5:00	Las Vegas, Nevada, United States	Won the UFC Light Heavyweight Championship.
Loss	12–6	Vitor Belfort	TKO (doctor stoppage)	UFC 46	January 31, 2004	1	0:49	Las Vegas, Nevada, United States	Lost the UFC Light Heavyweight Championship.
Win	12–5	Tito Ortiz	Decision (unanimous)	UFC 44	September 26, 2003	5	5:00	Las Vegas, Nevada, United States	Won and unified the UFC Light Heavyweight Championship.
Win	11–5	Chuck Liddell	TKO (punches)	UFC 43	June 6, 2003	3	2:39	Las Vegas, Nevada, United States	Light Heavyweight debut. Won the interim UFC Light Heavyweight Championship.
Loss	10–5	Ricco Rodriguez	TKO (submission to elbow)	UFC 39	September 27, 2002	5	3:04	Montville, Connecticut, United States	For the vacant UFC Heavyweight Championship.
Loss	10–4	Josh Barnett	TKO (punches)	UFC 36	March 22, 2002	2	4:35	Las Vegas, Nevada, United States	Lost the UFC Heavyweight Championship. Barnett subsequently tested positive for banned substances and the championship was vacated.
Win	10–3	Pedro Rizzo	TKO (punches)	UFC 34	November 2, 2001	3	1:38	Las Vegas, Nevada, United States	Defended the UFC Heavyweight Championship.
Win	9–3	Pedro Rizzo	Decision (unanimous)	UFC 31	May 4, 2001	5	5:00	Atlantic City, New Jersey, United States	Defended the UFC Heavyweight Championship.
Loss	8–3	Valentijn Overeem	Submission (guillotine choke)	Rings: King of Kings 2000 Final	February 24, 2001	1	0:56	Tokyo, Japan	
Win	8–2	Tsuyoshi Kohsaka	Decision (unanimous)	Rings: King of Kings 2000 Final	February 24, 2001	2	5:00	Tokyo, Japan	
Win	7–2	Kevin Randleman	TKO (punches)	UFC 28	November 17, 2000	3	4:13	Atlantic City, New Jersey, United States	Won the UFC Heavyweight Championship.
Win	6–2	Ryushi Yanagisawa	Decision (majority)	Rings: King of Kings 2000 Block A	October 9, 2000	2	5:00	Tokyo, Japan	
Win	5–2	Jeremy Horn	Decision (unanimous)	Rings: King of Kings 2000 Block A	October 9, 2000	3	5:00	Tokyo, Japan	
Loss	4–2	Mikhail Ilyukhin	Submission (kimura)	Rings: Rise 1st	March 20, 1999	1	7:43	Japan	
Loss	4–1	Enson Inoue	Submission (armbar)	Vale Tudo Japan 1998	October 25, 1998	1	1:39	Japan	
Win	4–0	Maurice Smith	Decision (majority)	UFC Japan: Ultimate Japan	December 21, 1997	1	21:00	Yokohama, Kanagawa, Japan	Won the UFC Heavyweight Championship. Later vacated the title due to a contract dispute.
Win	3–0	Vitor Belfort	TKO (punches)	UFC 15	October 17, 1997	1	8:16	Bay St. Louis, Mississippi, United States	UFC Heavyweight title eliminator.
Win	2–0	Steven Graham	TKO (punches)	UFC 13	May 30, 1997	1	3:13	Augusta, Georgia, United States	Won the UFC 13 Heavyweight Tournament.
Win	1–0	Tony Halme	Submission (rear-naked choke)	UFC 13	May 30, 1997	1	1:00	Augusta, Georgia, United States	UFC 13 Heavyweight Tournament Semifinal.

== Pay-per-view bouts ==
No.	Event	Fight	Date	Venue	City	PPV Buys
1.	UFC Japan	Smith vs. Couture	December 21, 1997	Yokohama Arena	Yokohama, Kanagawa, Japan	Unknown
2.	UFC 28	Randleman vs. Couture	November 17, 2000	Mark G. Etess Arena	Atlantic City, New Jersey, United States	Unknown
3.	UFC 31	Couture vs. Rizzo	May 4, 2001	Mark G. Etess Arena	Atlantic City, New Jersey, United States	Unknown
4.	UFC 34	Couture vs. Rizzo 2	November 2, 2001	MGM Grand Garden Arena	Las Vegas, Nevada, United States	65,000
5.	UFC 36	Couture vs. Barnett	March 22, 2002	MGM Grand Garden Arena	Las Vegas, Nevada, United States	55,000
6.	UFC 39	Couture vs. Rodriguez	September 27, 2002	Mohegan Sun Arena	Uncasville, Connecticut, United States	45,000
7.	UFC 43	Liddell vs. Couture	June 6, 2003	Thomas & Mack Center	Las Vegas, Nevada, United States	49,000
8.	UFC 44	Ortiz vs. Couture	September 26, 2003	Mandalay Bay Events Center	Las Vegas, Nevada, United States	94,000
9.	UFC 46	Couture vs. Belfort 2	January 31, 2004	Mandalay Bay Events Center	Las Vegas, Nevada, United States	80,000
10.	UFC 49	Belfort vs. Couture 3	August 21, 2004	MGM Grand Garden Arena	Las Vegas, Nevada, United States	80,000
11.	UFC 52	Couture vs. Liddell 2	April 16, 2005	MGM Grand Garden Arena	Las Vegas, Nevada, United States	280,000
12.	UFC 57	Liddell vs. Couture 3	February 4, 2006	Mandalay Bay Events Center	Las Vegas, Nevada, United States	400,000
13.	UFC 68	Sylvia vs. Couture	March 3, 2007	Nationwide Arena	Columbus, Ohio, United States	540,000
14.	UFC 74	Couture vs. Gonzaga	August 25, 2007	Mandalay Bay Events Center	Las Vegas, Nevada, United States	485,000
15.	UFC 91	Couture vs. Lesnar	November 15, 2008	MGM Grand Garden Arena	Las Vegas, Nevada, United States	1,010,000
16.	UFC 102	Couture vs. Nogueira	August 29, 2009	Moda Center	Portland, Oregon, United States	435,000
17.	UFC 109	Couture vs. Coleman	February 6, 2010	Mandalay Bay Events Center	Las Vegas, Nevada, United States	285,000

== Filmography ==
Key
†	Denotes works that have not yet been released

Year	Film	Role	Notes
2003	Cradle 2 the Grave	Fight Club Fighter #8	
2005	No Rules	Mason	
2005	Today You Die	Vincent's Bodyguard	Direct-to-video
2006	Invincible	"Toruci" Player #1	
2006	The King of Queens	Priority Plus Driver	Uncredited; Episode: "Fight Schlub"
2007	Big Stan	Carnahan	
2007	The Unit	Sgt. Strickland	2 Episodes
2008	Redbelt	Dylan Flynn	
2008	The Scorpion King 2: Rise of a Warrior	Sargon	Direct-to-video
2010	The Expendables	Toll Road	
2011	Setup	Petey	
2012	Hijacked	Paul Ross	Direct-to-video
2012	The Expendables 2	Toll Road	
2013	3 Geezers!	Randy	
2013	Ambushed	Jack Reiley	Direct-to-video
2014	The Expendables 3	Toll Road	
2014	Stretch	Jovi	Direct-to-video
2015	Whose Line Is It Anyway?	Himself	
2015–2017	Hawaii Five-0	Jason Duclair	4 episodes
2016	Hell's Kitchen	Himself	Reality show; Guest diner Episode: "5 Chefs Compete"
2016	Range 15	Himself	Indie film
2016	Nine Legends	Himself	Documentary
2017	Pawn Stars	Himself	Reality show Episode: "Pawnie and Clyde"
2018	Impractical Jokers	Himself	Hidden camera prank show Episode: "Pantsing with the Stars"
2018	The Row	Detective Cole	
2019	D-Day: Battle of Omaha Beach	Major Cleveland Lytle	Direct-to-Video
2019	The Hard Way	Toro / Briggs	Netflix Movie
2020	Final Kill	Deacon Long	Direct-to-Video
2022	Blowback	Jack	
2022	Demon Hunters (aka Demon Pit)	G Man (Gerald)	
2023	NCIS: Los Angeles	ATF agent Bill Newsome	Season 14; Episode: New Beginnings
2023	Expend4bles	Toll Road	
2023	Outlaw Johnny Black	Bill Basset	
2023	The Bell Keeper	Hank	
2024	Angels Fallen: Warriors of Peace	Marcus	

== Video games ==
Year	Title	Role	Notes	Ref.
2008	Command & Conquer: Red Alert 3	Commander Warren Fuller	Real Time Strategy	
2010	EA Sports MMA	Himself	Playable in both Heavyweight and Light Heavyweight divisions	

== See also ==
- List of male mixed martial artists
- List of UFC champions
- Double champions in MMA
- UFC Hall of Fame

Awards and achievements
Preceded by Maurice Smith	3rd UFC Heavyweight Champion; December 21, 1997 – October 1, 1998	Vacant Couture stripped of title Title next held by Bas Rutten
Preceded by Kevin Randleman	6th UFC Heavyweight Champion; November 17, 2000 – March 22, 2002	Succeeded by Josh Barnett
New championship	1st Interim UFC Light Heavyweight Champion; June 6, 2003 – September 26, 2003	Vacant Title next held by Jon Jones
Preceded by Tito Ortiz	3rd UFC Light Heavyweight Champion; September 26, 2003 – January 31, 2004	Succeeded by Vitor Belfort
Preceded by Vitor Belfort	5th UFC Light Heavyweight Champion; August 21, 2004 – April 16, 2005	Succeeded by Chuck Liddell
Preceded by Tim Sylvia	13th UFC Heavyweight Champion; March 3, 2007 – November 15, 2008	Succeeded by Brock Lesnar
