= NCIS: Hawaiʻi season 2 =

NCIS: Hawaiʻi
- Season 2
- Showrunner: Matt Bosack
- Starring: Vanessa Lachey; Alex Tarrant; Noah Mills; Yasmine Al-Bustami; Jason Antoon; Tori Anderson; Kian Talan
- No. of episodes: 22

Release
- Original network: CBS
- Original release: September 19, 2022 – May 22, 2023

Season chronology
- ← Previous; Season 1 Next → Season 3

The second season of the American police procedural television series NCIS: Hawaiʻi premiered on September 19, 2022 on CBS during the 2022–23 television season, and concluded on May 22, 2023. A total of 22 episode were produced this season.

The season premiered with a crossover event with NCIS. A three-way crossover event with both NCIS and NCIS: Los Angeles took place during the season in episode 10.

For the 2022–23 television season, the second season of NCIS: Hawaiʻi ranked #16 with an average of 7.53 million viewers.

== Cast and characters ==
=== Main ===
- Vanessa Lachey as Jane Tennant: The first female Special Agent-in-Charge of the NCIS: Hawaiʻi Field Office.
- Alex Tarrant as Kai Holman: A new NCIS agent on the team who recently returned home to care for his father.
- Noah Mills as Jesse Boone: Tennant's confidant and second-in-command, Boone is a former homicide detective in Washington, D.C., who knows the islands' hiking trails well.
- Yasmine Al-Bustami as Lucy Tara: The junior field agent of NCIS: Hawaiʻi, and Whistler's love-interest turned girlfriend.
- Jason Antoon as Ernie Malik: NCIS: Hawaiʻi's cyber intelligence specialist
- Tori Anderson as Kathrine "Kate" Marie Whistler: a Defense Intelligence Agency (DIA) Officer, later Federal Bureau of Investigation (FBI) Special Agent and NCIS-FBI liaison. Tara's love interest-turned-girlfriend.
- Kian Talan as Alex Tennant: Jane's eldest child.

=== Recurring ===
- Mark Gessner as Neil Pike: A Coast Guard Investigative Service Special Agent.
- Enver Gjokaj as Captain Joe Milius: Deputy Chief of Staff to Commander, Pacific Fleet, later reassigned to the Pentagon.
- Mahina Napoleon as Julie Tennant: Jane's youngest child.
- Julie White as Maggie Shaw: Jane's former mentor and friend.
- Sharif Atkins as Captain Norman 'Boom Boom' Gates
- Seana Kofoed as Commander (Dr.) Carla Chase, a medical examiner assigned to Joint Base Pearl Harbor–Hickam.

=== Notable guests ===
- Henry Ian Cusick as John Swift, NCIS Supervisory Special Agent in Charge, member of the Office of Special Projects

=== Crossover ===
==== NCIS ====
- Wilmer Valderrama as Nick Torres: NCIS Special Agent who shares a past with Tennant.
- Katrina Law as Jessica Knight: NCIS Special Agent.
- Diona Reasonover as Kasie Hines: Forensic Specialist for NCIS.
- Gary Cole as Alden Parker: NCIS Supervisory Special Agent of the MCRT.
- Brian Dietzen as Dr. Jimmy Palmer, Chief Medical Examiner for NCIS.

==== NCIS: Los Angeles ====
- Chris O'Donnell as Grisha "G." Callen, NCIS Supervisory Special Agent of the Office of Special Projects in Los Angeles
- LL Cool J as Sam Hanna, NCIS Senior Field Agent, Second in Command of the OSP

== Episodes ==
| No. overall | No. in season | Title | Directed by | Written by | Original release date | Prod. code | U.S. viewers (millions) |
|---|---|---|---|---|---|---|---|
| 23 | 1 | "Prisoners' Dilemma" | Tim Andrew | Jan Nash & Christopher Silber | September 19, 2022 | HAW201 | 5.31 |
Part 3 of 3: After events in "A Family Matter" Kai and Jesse find poisoned passengers on a private jet in Oʻahu, fitting the Raven's M.O., but Herman Maxwell landed in Kalaeloa. Doctors Carla Chase and Jimmy Palmer conclude they succumbed to soman. Agents Torres and Knight from NCIS: D.C. team up to thwart Maxwell's attack on RIMPAC. Ernie identifies the Garrison Federal Prison "inside man" who helped Maxwell escape as Lieutenant Gary Shay. Parker confronts Shay, who Maxwell radicalized to gain internet access and activate followers to carry out attacks and frame Parker. After a false lead, they find Maxwell holding a dead man's switch to a nerve agent bomb. Kai assists EOD "Bam Bam" to defeat Maxwell's remote detonator. Earnie discovers that Maxwell learned Professor Woodrow Staggs' "crowd psychology" methods. Staggs knows him as Jason Hearns from his PsyOps pilot, labeling him "clinically...crazy." After realizing his son Leo Staggs is Maxwell's target, Bam Bam disarms the bomb while NCIS incapacitates the bombers and arrests Maxwell. Note: This episode concludes a crossover event that begins on NCIS season 20 episode 1.
| 24 | 2 | "Blind Curves" | Yangzom Brauen | Matt Bosack | September 26, 2022 | HAW202 | 4.58 |
Seeing blood, a junkyard worker halts the forklift operator, finding the remains of Marine SSgt. Travis Cobb. Finding a gunshot wound and "a unique chemical compound," Chase rules it murder. Earnie unlocks Cobbs' phone records, finding his girlfriend Lani Jones at an abandoned airstrip, where Jesse and Kai discover illegal street racing. Lani admits, Cobbs raced for money and vehicle titles, losing many cars. They track his Toyota Supra, learning about VIN cloning to mask stolen cars. Ernie locates a chop shop that NCIS raids, finding a bullet hole and blood in the paint booth. Kate provides FBI dossiers; NCIS narrows suspects down to Solomon De La Cruz, who has a tattoo of Lani, which might provide motive. They interrogate Sol, but rule him out because of his extreme allergy to paint. Through shell LLC's they locate Myron Chan, Lani's uncle, who is bedridden and dying of cancer, ruling him out as the murderer. Discovering Lani's violent criminal past, they arrest her and she confesses. Meanwhile, Jane worries about her son Alex's behavior and new girlfriend, and Kate is reluctant to introduce Lucy to her FBI colleagues.
| 25 | 3 | "Stolen Valor" | Tim Andrew | Amy Rutberg | October 3, 2022 | HAW203 | 4.91 |
Navy Lieutenant Commander Audrey Garrett messages, "I'm sorry. I can't do this," before her car accelerates, brakes fail, and crashes, killing her. Kai notices, "no officer's crest" on her cover. Notifying her husband Michael, they find the real Audrey alive and her ribbons, medals, and CAC ID replaced by replicas. Bam Bam reports "the car's supercomputer system was hacked" remotely to disable brakes, indicating murder. From Bulgarian dental implants, Chase identifies the imposter as Vessela Toska, whose belongings lead them to Happy Housekeepers owner Lydia Petrov, who had indictments for fraud. Still lacking a motive, Kate goes undercover, cleaning with Malkie and Elena. The next day, Petrov has her impersonate Garrett to sign for Navy cargo. The real Garrett notices supplies she did not procure, including caesium-137, which could be used in a dirty bomb. NCIS closes in, but they escape by motorboat to a ship where Malkie kills Petrov. Kate flees, hides, and ambushes Viktor Hristova and Petar Marinova to incapacitate them. Malkie follows to shoot Kate, who must user her newly-learned fighting skills to defeat Malkie. NCIS sends the Coast Guard to interdict the ship, and arrest its crew.
| 26 | 4 | "Primal Fear" | LeVar Burton | Ron McGee | October 10, 2022 | HAW204 | 4.57 |
icon
| 27 | 5 | "Sudden Death" | Tawnia McKiernan | Yalun Tu | October 17, 2022 | HAW205 | 4.96 |
icon
| 28 | 6 | "Changing Tides" | Lionel Coleman | Noah Evslin | October 24, 2022 | HAW206 | 5.01 |
icon
| 29 | 7 | "Vanishing Act" | Diana C. Valentine | Mike Diaz & Jan Nash | November 14, 2022 | HAW207 | 4.78 |
Allie Acosta goes missing from an elevator. Eleven year-old son Theo reports it to Jesse. Allie's barking dog clues Ernie, who reviews CCTV, finding licensed bounty hunter Mitchell Smith, who NCIS detains, while Allie steals his rental car. Smith informs that her real name is Allison Perez, who skipped bail after embezzling $20 million in Chicago. Jane realizes, she will not leave without Theo, who escapes Jesse's custody. After saving Theo from two chasing men, Jesse reasons to learn how Theo communicates with Allie – game chat. Lucy and Ernie discover three Globe Equities executives who framed Allie and continued embezzling from a newly-formed firm. Claiming documentation to prove her innocence, Jane arranges to bring in Allie, who is captured by the two men. Ernie back-traces a tracker the men used to find Allie. At her apartment, Jesse leaps from the next door balcony, distracting the armed men, while Kai breaches the front door. After a shoot out, they rescue Allie. Meanwhile, Lucy is awarded Special Agent Afloat aboard the USS Ronald Reagan to be "sheriff of a floating 5,000-person town" for four months in Singapore, but she is reluctant to leave Kate.
| 30 | 8 | "Curtain Call" | Christine Moore | Yakira Chambers | November 21, 2022 | HAW208 | 4.82 |
icon
| 31 | 9 | "Desperate Measures" | Kevin J. Berlandi | Ron McGee | December 5, 2022 | HAW209 | 4.52 |
Wanted for murdering DEA Agent Bree Foster, Army Ranger Sgt. Owen Santino abducts Commander Chase, ordering, "get to work" to autopsy Foster and prove his innocence. Kai learns Foster's task force investigated black market opioids. Tennant meets DEA Supervisory Special Agent Jerry Covington, Special Agent Kendra Vreeland, and "bullheaded" Agent Ned Ross, who describes Santino as an addicted informant-turned-dealer. Ernie learns Chase had previously proven Santino's buddy had overdosed accidentally. Whistler names dealer Russ Novak, who was seen with Santino. Vreeland wants Novak's supplier. Learning Foster tried helping Santino, Chase investigates willingly. Kai and Jesse try apprehending Novak, who draws on them, but Ross kills Novak first. Ernie locates Chase's hideout in Ewa Forest Reserve. Tennant exchanges herself, so Chase can complete her analysis. Jesses halts DEA's raid on Santino's hideout. Tennant recites the Ranger Creed to encourage the fatalistic Santino. Chase finds suxamethonium chloride, proving Foster was tranquilized from behind before being stabbed with Santino's knife, suggesting a frame-up. Covington takes custody of Santino. From Foster's wire taps, Tennant identifies and arrests Vreeland as George Bedalyan's DEA mole. Meanwhile, Kai confronts his father for accepting $50,000 from A.J. Hale, while FBI Agent Whistler investigates Hale's racketeering and money laundering.
| 32 | 10 | "Deep Fake" | Jimmy Whitmore | Christopher Silber | January 9, 2023 | HAW211 | 7.36 |
Tennant and DC medical examiner Jimmy Palmer, along with Los Angeles agent Sam Hanna, are kidnapped and held prisoner by a woman claiming to be a CIA agent investigating Simon Williams. Meanwhile, DC agent-in-charge Parker works with the Hawaii branch to find their missing teammates. They have a similar situation with a CIA agent, who turns out to be an imposter. The team eventually discovers that Simon Williams is the name for a computer program responsible for years worth of data, and that anyone affiliated with it is now in grave danger. Upon discovering that one of the members is none other than his boss, retired Navy Admiral Hollace Kilbride, Sam's partner, NCIS Special Agent G. Callen prepares to return to Los Angeles with Tennant accompanying him. Note: This episode continues a crossover event that begins on NCIS season 20 episode 10 and concludes on NCIS: LA season 14 episode 10.
| 33 | 11 | "Rising Sun" | Christoph Schrewe | Megan Bacharach & Matt Bosack | January 16, 2023 | HAW210 | 4.33 |
The team investigates when CGIS Special Agent Neil Pike is ambushed while working undercover for a local Japanese crime family and race to find his attacker. Meanwhile, Kai digs deeper into AJ Hale, his childhood friend who's now become a criminal.
| 34 | 12 | "Shields Up" | Norman Buckley | Jan Nash & Amy Rutberg | January 23, 2023 | HAW212 | 5.27 |
icon
| 35 | 13 | "Misplaced Targets" | Larry Teng | Yalun Tu | February 6, 2023 | HAW213 | 5.13 |
icon
| 36 | 14 | "Silent Invasion" | Eric Fox Hays | Mike Diaz | February 13, 2023 | HAW214 | 5.01 |
icon
| 37 | 15 | "Good Samaritan" | Larry Teng | Noah Evslin | February 27, 2023 | HAW215 | 5.12 |
icon
| 38 | 16 | "Family Ties" | Christine Moore | Ron McGee | March 13, 2023 | HAW216 | 5.15 |
icon
| 39 | 17 | "Money Honey" | Loren Yaconelli | Megan Bacharach | March 20, 2023 | HAW217 | 4.98 |
Jane and her ex Daniel struggle to deal with the fact that their son, Alex, has been accepted into the Naval Academy.
| 40 | 18 | "Bread Crumbs" | LeVar Burton | Jan Nash | April 10, 2023 | HAW218 | 5.02 |
icon
| 41 | 19 | "Cabin Fever" | Kurt Jones | Yakira Chambers | May 1, 2023 | HAW219 | 4.84 |
icon
| 42 | 20 | "Nightwatch Two" | Tim Andrew | Amy Rutberg | May 8, 2023 | HAW220 | 4.84 |
icon
| 43 | 21 | "Past Due" | Jimmy Whitmore | Christopher Silber & Yalun Tu | May 15, 2023 | HAW221 | 4.95 |
icon
| 44 | 22 | "Dies Irae" | Tim Andrew | Matt Bosack & Jan Nash | May 22, 2023 | HAW222 | 5.10 |
When a figure Jane encountered during her time as an officer with the CIA reappears, she and her colleagues seek help to apprehend a killer who's threatening to destroy everything she has built, receiving assistance from Sam Hanna of NCIS: Los Angeles Office of Special Projects.

=== Crossovers ===
The second season contained two further crossovers, the first once more with NCIS and the second with both NCIS and NCIS: Los Angeles.

== Production ==
=== Development ===
On March 31, 2022, CBS renewed the series for a second season which premiered on September 19, 2022.

== Ratings ==
Viewership and ratings per episode of NCIS: Hawaiʻi season 2
| No. | Title | Air date | Rating (18–49) | Viewers (millions) | DVR (18–49) | DVR viewers (millions) | Total (18–49) | Total viewers (millions) |
|---|---|---|---|---|---|---|---|---|
| 1 | "Prisoners' Dilemma" | September 19, 2022 | 0.4 | 5.31 | 0.3 | 3.08 | 0.7 | 8.39 |
| 2 | "Blind Curves" | September 26, 2022 | 0.3 | 4.58 | 0.2 | 2.65 | 0.6 | 7.23 |
| 3 | "Stolen Valor" | October 3, 2022 | 0.3 | 4.91 | 0.2 | 2.36 | 0.5 | 7.27 |
| 4 | "Primal Fear" | October 10, 2022 | 0.3 | 4.57 | 0.2 | 2.44 | 0.5 | 7.01 |
| 5 | "Sudden Death" | October 17, 2022 | 0.4 | 4.96 | 0.2 | 2.41 | 0.6 | 7.37 |
| 6 | "Changing Tides" | October 24, 2022 | 0.4 | 5.01 | 0.2 | 2.33 | 0.6 | 7.33 |
| 7 | "Vanishing Act" | November 14, 2022 | 0.3 | 4.78 | 0.2 | 2.45 | 0.5 | 7.23 |
| 8 | "Curtain Call" | November 21, 2022 | 0.3 | 4.82 | —N/a | —N/a | —N/a | —N/a |
| 9 | "Desperate Measures" | December 5, 2022 | 0.3 | 4.52 | —N/a | —N/a | —N/a | —N/a |
| 10 | "Deep Fake" | January 9, 2023 | 0.5 | 7.36 | 0.3 | 3.19 | 0.8 | 10.55 |
| 11 | "Rising Sun" | January 16, 2023 | 0.3 | 4.33 | 0.2 | 2.74 | 0.5 | 7.07 |
| 12 | "Shields Up" | January 23, 2023 | 0.4 | 5.27 | —N/a | —N/a | —N/a | —N/a |
| 13 | "Misplaced Targets" | February 6, 2023 | 0.4 | 5.13 | 0.2 | 3.37 | —N/a | 8.50 |
| 14 | "Silent Invasion" | February 13, 2023 | 0.3 | 5.01 | 0.2 | 3.44 | 0.8 | 8.45 |
| 15 | "Good Samaritan" | February 27, 2023 | 0.4 | 5.12 | 0.3 | 3.22 | 0.5 | 8.34 |
| 16 | "Family Ties" | March 13, 2023 | 0.4 | 5.15 | —N/a | —N/a | —N/a | —N/a |
| 17 | "Money Honey" | March 20, 2023 | 0.3 | 4.98 | 0.4 | 2.22 | —N/a | 7.20 |
| 18 | "Bread Crumbs" | April 10, 2023 | 0.3 | 5.02 | 0.2 | —N/a | —N/a | —N/a |
| 19 | "Cabin Fever" | May 1, 2023 | 0.3 | 4.84 | —N/a | —N/a | —N/a | —N/a |
| 20 | "Nightwatch Two" | May 8, 2023 | 0.3 | 4.84 | —N/a | —N/a | —N/a | —N/a |
| 21 | "Past Due (Part 1)" | May 15, 2023 | 0.3 | 4.95 | —N/a | —N/a | —N/a | —N/a |
| 22 | "Dies Irae (Part 2)" | May 22, 2023 | 0.3 | 5.10 | —N/a | —N/a | —N/a | —N/a |

== Home media ==
NCIS: Hawaiʻi: Season Two
| Set details | Special features | |
| 6 disc; 22 episodes | | |
DVD release dates
| Region 1 | Region 2 | Region 4 |
| October 3, 2023 | | |
