= NCIS: Hawaiʻi season 3 =

NCIS: Hawaiʻi
- Season 3
- Showrunner: Matt Bosack
- Starring: Vanessa Lachey; Alex Tarrant; Noah Mills; Yasmine Al-Bustami; Jason Antoon; Tori Anderson
- No. of episodes: 10

Release
- Original network: CBS
- Original release: February 12 – May 6, 2024

Season chronology
- ← Previous; Season 2

The third and final season of the American police procedural television series premiered on CBS on February 12, 2024 during the 2023–24 television season, and concluded on May 6. Due to the 2023 Writers Guild of America and SAG-AFTRA strikes, a total of only 10 episodes were produced for the season so it is the shortest season of NCIS: Hawaiʻi. On April 26, 2024, CBS cancelled the series after three seasons. The network explained that the decision was due to financial costs, the show ratings, and the network's TV show lineup for the 2024–25 television season schedule.

The third season of NCIS: Hawaiʻi ranked #16 with an average of 7.78 million viewers.

== Cast and characters ==
=== Main ===
- Vanessa Lachey as Jane Tennant: The first female Special Agent-in-Charge of the NCIS: Hawaiʻi Field Office.
- Alex Tarrant as Kai Holman: A new NCIS agent on the team who recently returned home to care for his father.
- Noah Mills as Jesse Boone: Tennant's confidant and Second-in-Command, Boone is a former homicide detective in Washington, D.C., who knows the islands' hiking trails well.
- Yasmine Al-Bustami as Lucy Tara: The junior field agent of NCIS: Hawaiʻi, and Whistler's love-interest turned girlfriend.
- Jason Antoon as Ernie Malik: NCIS: Hawaiʻi's cyber intelligence specialist
- Tori Anderson as Kathrine "Kate” Marie Whistler: a Defense Intelligence Agency (DIA) Officer, later Federal Bureau of Investigation (FBI) Special Agent and NCIS-FBI liaison. Tara's love interest-turned-girlfriend.

=== Special guest star ===
- LL Cool J as Sam Hanna, NCIS Senior Field Agent, Second in Command of the Office of Special Projects in Los Angeles.

=== Guest ===
- Kian Talan as Alex Tennant: Jane's eldest child.
- Henry Ian Cusick as John Swift, NCIS Supervisory Special Agent in Charge, member of the OSP.

== Episodes ==
No. overall	No. in season	Title	Directed by	Written by	Original release date	Prod. code	U.S. viewers (millions)
45	1	"Run and Gun"	Tim Andrew	Jan Nash & Christopher Silber	February 12, 2024	HAW301	5.56
(Part 1) As Jane returns to work, having passed her medical and psych evaluations, she and the team investigate the death of a man, eventually uncovering a breach at the US Marshal's database that means the list of witnesses in WITSEC has been exposed and is on the dark web. Meanwhile, Sam Hanna from OSP in Los Angeles assists Jane with trying to cope with recent events and the murder of her friend, Charlie 1.
46	2	"Crash and Burn"	Tim Andrew	Jan Nash & Christopher Silber	February 19, 2024	HAW302	5.22
(Part 2) Following the crash of a prisoner transport plane, the NCIS team must find the convicts that escaped onto the island. During the apprehensions, Sam Hanna and Tennant are tasked by Swift to locate a high-profile Russian prisoner known as "The Chemist", a biological weapon maker.
47	3	"License to Thrill"	Christine Moore	Ron McGee & Amy Rutberg	February 26, 2024	HAW303	5.40
When a robbery of a Navy Federal Credit occurs takes place in broad daylight, the team find themselves searching for a group of adrenaline-seeking thieves. Jane grows increasingly suspicious of Sam's reasons for having arrived in Hawaii.
48	4	"Dead on Arrival"	Larry Teng	Yalun Tu & Noah Evslin	March 4, 2024	HAW304	5.40
The team investigate when a Navy pilot is found murdered at a local military resort with Lucy and Kate going undercover to find the mastermind running the criminal enterprise that's literally operating in plain sight. Meanwhile, Sam’s continued stay in Hawaii begins to annoy Jesse, who starts to feel sidelined.
49	5	"Serve and Protect"	Yangzom Brauen	Story by : Matt Bosack; Teleplay by : Fallon O'Dowd & Matt Bosack	March 25, 2024	HAW305	4.82
The team is tasked to protect the daughter of a Russian oligarch carrying a deadly secret and is planning on defecting. Meanwhile, Sam asks Tennant for assistance in interrogating The Chemist for the latter’s remaining bioweapon locations.
50	6	"Operation Red Rabbit"	LeVar Burton	Amy Rutberg & Mike Diaz	April 1, 2024	HAW306	4.98
When the fiancée of a vanished Naval officer seeks the help of NCIS, his secrets are exposed and go much deeper than she suspected. Meanwhile, Sam recruits Kai to be his exercise wingman.
51	7	"The Next Thousand"	Daniela Ruah	Matt Bosack & Jan Nash & Christopher Silber	April 15, 2024	HAW307	5.40
When a Marine is murdered in the woods on the Big Island during training, the team tracks the suspect deep into the woods and discovers a disturbing secret. Jane gets a concussion during the search and encounters a mysterious figure in an isolated cabin.
52	8	"Into Thin Air"	Sherman Shelton	Ron McGee & Megan Bacharach	April 22, 2024	HAW308	5.12
When a Marine's wife is kidnapped for ransom, the team uncovers dark secrets while tracking down her abductors (who trigger Sam’s clown phobia wearing clown masks). Meanwhile, Sam asks Ernie's assistance decrypting a top secret computer program that could lead to major consequences.
53	9	"Spill the Tea"	LeVar Burton	Ron McGee & Megan Bacharach	April 29, 2024	HAW309	5.07
When The Chemist is murdered in NCIS ELITE’s secret compound in Hawaii, Jane’s team and ELITE collaborate and find out a deadlier threat is in play.
54	10	"Divided We Conquer"	Christine Moore	Yalun Tu & Megan Bacharach	May 6, 2024	HAW310	5.41
In the series finale, following the ambush that left the majority of the ELITE team dead, Jane and the team must track down a Filipino terrorist group and their targets.

== Production ==
=== Development ===
On February 21, 2023, CBS renewed the series for a third season.

The production of the season was delayed due to the WGA and SAG-AFTRA strikes in the United States.

=== Casting ===
On May 22, 2023, following the series finale of NCIS: Los Angeles, it was announced that LL Cool J would reprise the role of Sam Hanna as a recurring guest star in the third season.

=== Filming ===
Filming for the third season began on December 4, 2023.

On January 5, 2024 it was announced that NCIS: Los Angeles star Daniela Ruah would be directing an episode this season, later revealed be episode 7 "The Next Thousand”.

== Release ==
The third season premiered on February 12, 2024.

== Ratings ==
Viewership and ratings per episode of NCIS: Hawaiʻi season 3
No.	Title	Air date	Rating (18–49)	Viewers (millions)
1	"Run and Gun"	February 12, 2024	0.4/5	5.56
2	"Crash and Burn"	February 19, 2024	0.4/5	5.22
3	"License to Thrill"	February 26, 2024	0.4/5	5.40
4	"Dead on Arrival"	March 4, 2024	0.4/5	5.40
5	"Serve and Protect"	March 25, 2024	0.3/4	4.82
6	"Operation Red Rabbit"	April 1, 2024	0.3/4	4.98
7	"The Next Thousand"	April 15, 2024	0.3/4	5.40
8	"Into Thin Air"	April 22, 2024	0.3/4	5.12
9	"Spill the Tea"	April 29, 2024	0.3/4	5.06
10	"Divided We Conquer"	May 6, 2024	0.4/4	5.41

== Home media ==
NCIS: Hawaiʻi: The Final Season
Set details	Special features	
10 episodes; 3 discs; Media Format: NTSC, 4K; Run time: 6 hours and 25 minutes		
DVD release dates
Region 1	Region 2	Region 4
October 6, 2024		
