= NCIS season 20 =

NCIS
- Season 20
- Season 20 U.S. DVD cover
- Starring: Sean Murray; Wilmer Valderrama; Katrina Law; Brian Dietzen; Diona Reasonover; David McCallum; Rocky Carroll; Gary Cole
- No. of episodes: 22

Release
- Original network: CBS
- Original release: September 19, 2022 – May 22, 2023

Season chronology
- ← Previous; Season 19 Next → Season 21

The twentieth season of the American police procedural television series NCIS premiered on September 19, 2022 on CBS during the 2022–23 television season, and concluded on May 22, 2023. This is the first season not to credit Mark Harmon who had portrayed Leroy Jethro Gibbs since the show's first season, and the last to feature David McCallum prior to his death on September 25, 2023. This season includes the 450th episode of the series. The season contains 22 episodes.

== Premise ==
NCIS revolves around a fictional team of special agents from the Naval Criminal Investigative Service, which conducts criminal investigations involving the United States Navy and Marine Corps. Based at the Washington Navy Yard in Washington, D.C., the NCIS team is led by Supervisory Special Agent Alden Parker, an ex-FBI Special Agent and a skilled investigator.

== Cast and characters ==
=== Main ===
- Sean Murray as Timothy McGee, NCIS Senior Special Agent, Second in Command of the Major Case Response Team (MCRT) assigned to Washington's Navy Yard and NCIS Acting Director
- Wilmer Valderrama as Nick Torres, NCIS Special Agent
- Katrina Law as Jessica Knight, NCIS Special Agent
- Brian Dietzen as Dr. Jimmy Palmer, Chief Medical Examiner for NCIS
- Diona Reasonover as Kasie Hines, Forensic Specialist for NCIS
- David McCallum as Dr. Donald "Ducky" Mallard, NCIS Historian and former Chief Medical Examiner
- Rocky Carroll as Leon Vance, NCIS Director
- Gary Cole as Alden Parker, NCIS Supervisory Special Agent (SSA) of MCRT and former FBI Special Agent

=== Crossover ===
==== NCIS: Hawaiʻi ====
- Vanessa Lachey as Jane Tennant, NCIS Special Agent in Charge
- Jason Antoon as Ernie Malik, NCIS Cyber Intelligence Specialist
- Noah Mills as Jesse Boone, NCIS Second-in-Command

==== NCIS: Los Angeles ====
- Chris O'Donnell as Grisha "G." Callen, NCIS Supervisory Special Agent
- LL Cool J as Sam Hanna, NCIS Senior Field Agent, Second in Command

=== Notable guest stars ===
- Joe Spano as Tobias Fornell, Private Detective and former FBI Senior Special Agent
- Teri Polo as Vivian Kolchak, Alden Parker’s ex-wife and DOD paranormal investigator
- Laura San Giacomo as Dr. Grace Confalone, psychotherapist
- Carolyn Hennesy as Tara Flynn, the Secretary of the Navy
- Patrick Labyorteaux as Olev Kozlov (previously appeared as Bud Roberts)
- David Blue as Charlie Samuels
- Lilan Bowden as Robin Knight, Jessica Knight's sister
- Margo Harshman as Delilah Fielding-McGee, DoD Intelligence Analyst and McGee's wife
- Juliette Goglia as Viktoria Valkov/Evelyn Shaw, Russian spy, Yuri's sister and Kostya's daughter
- Gregg Binkley as Bob Stivers
- Robert Picardo as Retired Marine Gunnery Sergeant Dale Harding
- Rachel Ticotin as Joy Sullivan Aaronson, Alden Parker's first love
- Zane Holtz as Dale Sawyer, NCIS Special Agent
- Tania Raymonde as Chloe Marlene
- Francis Xavier McCarthy as Roman Parker, Alden Parker's father
- Michael Patrick Thornton as Jeremy Brighton, author, podcaster and online parenting coach for wheelchair users
- Brigid Brannagh as Constance Miller, US senator
- Scott Lawrence as DEA Agent Raymond Frank (previously appeared as Sturgis Turner in JAG from 2001 to 2005)
- James Snyder as Dr. Miles Bauer
- Ilia Volok as Kostya Valkov, Viktoria and Yuri's father

== Episodes ==
No. overall	No. in season	Title	Directed by	Written by	Original release date	Prod. code	U.S. viewers (millions)
436	1	"A Family Matter"	Tawnia McKiernan	Scott Williams	September 19, 2022	2001	5.82
Part 2 of 3: After events in "Birds of a Feather" FBI Deputy Director Wayne Sweeney and FBI Agent Ramirez seek to arrest NCIS-SSA Parker. After alleviating Parker's suspicion of his ex-wife Vivian Kolchak' texting, they team with Tobias Fornell and NCIS to identify who might gain by framing Parker, and to capture the Raven (from "The Helpers"). With Parker's reputation in question, convicted hacker Herman Maxwell appeals for release. Meanwhile, NCIS: Hawaiʻi agents Jane Tennant and Ernie Malik visit D.C. to prepare for RIMPAC. Samantha Delfino traces offshore accounts used to frame Parker to Moscow. Maxwell implies a Russian gangster nicknamed "Voron" (Raven) is behind it all. NCIS plans to draw out and capture Voron by releasing Maxwell as bait. Simultanesously, Sweeney blocks their convoy to arrest Parker, while gunmen ambush them to abduct Maxwell, who escapes and smirks at Parker, who realizes Maxwell is the Raven. Shot, Vivian is taken to the hospital. McGee confirms prints; the shooters were Raven devotees, the Unkindness. Vance reports Maxwell's destination is Hawaiʻi, possibly targeting RIMPAC. Parker orders Torres and Knight to "take down that son of a bitch". Note: This episode begins a crossover event that concludes on the season 2 premiere of NCIS: Hawai'i.
437	2	"Daddy Issues"	Michael Zinberg	Christopher J. Waild	September 26, 2022	2002	6.11
McGee is in for a surprise when a fellow father from his kids' school is revealed to have some involvement in a break-in at a secret government vault. The case brings McGee to the realization that some other parents from his kids' school see him as uptight and antisocial.
438	3	"Unearth"	Diana Valentine	Yasemin Yilmaz	October 3, 2022	2003	6.92
A murder investigation introduces NCIS to a longstanding curse that ultimately puts Torres and Dr. Grace Confalone in a tight spot. Meanwhile, Kasie tries to throw Ducky a good birthday celebration.
439	4	"Leave No Trace"	William Webb	Chad Gomez Creasey	October 10, 2022	2004	6.60
NCIS joins forces with the National Parks Investigative Service when a dead petty officer is found in the woods. The agent they work with, Gage Winchester, happens to be Knight's ex-boyfriend who hopes to get back with her. However, this only pushes Knight closer to Jimmy as she agrees to go on a spa weekend with him, signaling a more concrete definition of their relationship.
440	5	"Guardian"	James Whitmore Jr.	Marco Schnabel	October 17, 2022	2005	6.91
Vance is accosted by burglars in his home but subdues them, killing one of them. Parker takes it upon himself to be Vance's protection detail at an upcoming conference in Berlin, while McGee assumes the role of acting director and Torres & Knight investigate. While in Berlin, an Interpol official with whom Vance is romantically involved is also attacked, leading the team to investigate a theft of diamonds.
441	6	"The Good Fighter"	José Clemente Hernandez	Kimberly-Rose Wolter	October 24, 2022	2006	6.97
While Kasie undergoes self-defense fight training, the body of an NCIS agent is discovered. The agent was moonlighting as a hacker to use paid funds from large corporations for charitable donations, and agents recruit Kasie for an undercover investigation which reveals that NCIS has a mole.
442	7	"Love Lost"	Rocky Carroll	Brendan Fehily & David J. North	November 14, 2022	2007	6.44
The estranged husband of the Secretary of the Navy, Tara Flynn, alleges she is trying to kill him, leaving the team with the uncomfortable task of investigating their boss' boss.
443	8	"Turkey Trot"	Lionel Coleman	Diona Reasonover & Scott Williams	November 21, 2022	2008	6.79
At a Thanksgiving event, an explosion nearly kills an admiral, but the perpetrator, Charles Samuels, was aiming at Knight instead. Charles is the brother of a veteran who committed suicide despite Knight trying to talk him down during her time as a REACT agent. Having held a grudge all this time, Charles entered a romantic relationship with Knight's sister Robin and ultimately takes the two of them along with Kasie hostage. Meanwhile, Knight and Robin are forced to confront their mutual animosity.
444	9	"Higher Education"	Claudia Yarmy	Katherine Beattie	December 5, 2022	2009	6.43
NCIS investigates the murder of a student who had been learning under Delilah Fielding-McGee, forcing the team to seek her help in solving the case. The highly classified files on the victim's laptop complicate the case as, in the wrong hands, those files are capable of compromising national security. Meanwhile, McGee is struggling to come up with ideas for his books, especially after Gibbs’ departure from NCIS.
445	10	"Too Many Cooks"	Michael Zinberg	Christopher J. Waild	January 9, 2023	2010	7.93
Agents from Hawaii and Los Angeles convene in DC to attend the retirement party of Dale Harding, a beloved FLETC professor, but when he commits suicide that morning the teams work together to determine why he had classified files. McGee is briefly thought to be responsible for treason, though he is cleared of wrongdoing soon after. The case escalates to a manhunt for Simon Williams, whose picture has been on the NCIS Most Wanted wall for a lengthy period, then takes a grim turn when Palmer and Tennant go missing. Note: This episode begins a crossover event that continues on NCIS: Hawaiʻi, season 2, episode 10 and concludes on NCIS: LA, season 14, episode 10.
446	11	"Bridges"	Lionel Coleman	Chad Gomez Creasey	January 16, 2023	2011	6.16
When a young woman is found strangled to death in a motel bedroom, the team discovers she and her adoptive parents are Russian spies responsible for many counts of fraud and identity theft, with Parker being one of the ones whose identity was stolen. The case reintroduces Parker to an old flame that he never fully got over. Elsewhere, Knight wishes to watch a movie with Jimmy and Victoria, but unknowingly asks to watch an old family favorite of Breena's, which is met with mixed feelings.
447	12	"Big Rig"	Rocky Carroll	Marco Schnabel	January 23, 2023	2012	7.54
NCIS agent Dale Sawyer comes to Torres unnerved during an undercover operation that Torres had passed on due to wanting to maintain his sobriety. When a body is later discovered and the team thinks it's Sawyer's, Torres feels responsible, but the team finds that Sawyer is alive and he shot his partner (a dirty cop) in self-defense and his cover is blown. Torres joins him undercover to bust a ring of truck heisters, and the rivalry between the two mellows into a frenemy relationship. Elsewhere, McGee prepares to be a contestant on a game show, but the 5-time champion he is to face is revealed to have cheated, requiring production of the show to pause.
448	13	"Evil Eye"	Michael Zinberg	Brendan Fehily & Kimberly-Rose Wolter	February 6, 2023	2013	7.15
Famous actress Chloe Marlene shadows NCIS in preparation for a role and ultimately assists in apprehending a serial killer targeting people with heterochromia.
449	14	"Old Wounds"	Diana Valentine	Brian Dietzen & Scott Williams	February 13, 2023	2014	7.05
The investigation into the death of a delivery driver leads to the discovery of opioids with a "W" engraved on them, a symbol Parker recognizes from his past. He uncharacteristically unleashes anger towards his team, then goes off while interrogating the prime suspect, who he took down years prior as part of a case with the FBI that put his old partner in a wheelchair by means of Parker's gunshot accidentally hitting the agent in the back.
450	15	"Unusual Suspects"	James Whitmore Jr.	Katherine Beattie	February 27, 2023	2015	7.01
The team investigates the murder of a petty officer whose car ran off the road after he had been drugged, finding he was helping elderly widows financially and emotionally. Elsewhere, Parker's father Roman stays with him temporarily; father and son annoy each other until Parker helps Roman move into the facility where the elderly residents had met the officer.
451	16	"Butterfly Effect"	Tawnia McKiernan	Christopher J. Waild	March 13, 2023	2016	7.19
NCIS suspects bioterrorism when multiple people drop due to a toxic yet non-fatal gas outbreak, coming across a career thief during the investigation. In the end, the team noticed connections of the incident with other cases they recently tackled. Elsewhere, Knight's father sustains a broken arm in Japan, but complications threaten his life.
452	17	"Stranger in a Strange Land"	James Whitmore Jr.	Chad Gomez Creasey	March 20, 2023	2017	6.60
A veteran who was helping Afghan refugees to escape the Taliban is found murdered in his garage, leading the team to a violent white nationalist group. Elsewhere, Jimmy grapples with the reality that his daughter is growing up, and Torres bonds with another Afghan refugee.
453	18	"Head Games"	Michael Zinberg	Sydney Mitchel	April 10, 2023	2018	6.84
A Navy lieutenant is accused of stabbing her husband but has no memory of the attack. NCIS investigates only to discover a far more sinister plot involving the husband. Elsewhere, Kasie wants to accomplish all the life goals on her list after finding out that one of her relatives has been diagnosed with early Alzheimer's, fearing she may have inherited the gene.
454	19	"In the Spotlight"	Rocky Carroll	Yasemin Yilmaz	May 1, 2023	2019	6.81
Knight goes viral after rescuing a mother and child whose car had crashed outside the Navy Yard. The team proceeds to investigate when it is found out that someone is out to harm the mother.
455	20	"Second Opinion"	Tawnia McKiernan	Marco Schnabel	May 8, 2023	2020	6.64
When a senator's daughter is found murdered, her mother insists NCIS bring in a second forensic expert: celebrity pathologist and Jimmy's former college roommate Miles Bauer. Bauer quickly pins the crime on an obsessed stalker, but the truth may not be that simple.
456	21	"Kompromat"	Lionel Coleman	Scott Williams	May 15, 2023	2021	6.66
A murder at the Navy archives is linked to the Russian spies that NCIS had arrested in recent months. They soon discover that a devastating attack is imminent and must race against the clock to prevent it. Elsewhere, Jimmy blurts out to Knight that he loves her without immediately realizing it and worries about the state of their relationship as a result, but Knight later declares she loves him too.
457	22	"Black Sky"	Diana Valentine	Brendan Fehily & David J. North	May 22, 2023	2022	6.73
Torres goes undercover in Yuri's prison and befriends a young inmate who swears he is framed for a crime he did not commit. He recognizes the young man's stepfather as someone from his family's past and calls his sister upon arriving back at NCIS following Yuri's murder at the hands of his henchmen. They realize that Yuri's father, the mastermind of the attack (which would knock out all power in the United States for a prolonged period) had his own son killed due to Yuri's loose lips. After the team halts the attack and brings power back, Torres goes alone to confront the man he recognized, intending to kill him, ending the episode in a cliffhanger. Cast: Final appearance of David McCallum as Dr. Donald "Ducky" Mallard, due to McCallum's death on September 25, 2023.

== Production ==
=== Development ===
On March 31, 2022, NCIS was renewed for a twentieth season, which premiered on September 19, 2022.

== Ratings ==
Viewership and ratings per episode of NCIS season 20
No.	Title	Air date	Rating (18–49)	Viewers (millions)	DVR (18–49)	DVR viewers (millions)	Total (18–49)	Total viewers (millions)
1	"A Family Matter"	September 19, 2022	0.4	5.82	0.3	3.43	0.7	9.25
2	"Daddy Issues"	September 26, 2022	0.4	6.11	0.3	3.21	0.7	9.32
3	"Unearth"	October 3, 2022	0.4	6.92	0.3	3.02	0.7	9.95
4	"Leave No Trace"	October 10, 2022	0.4	6.60	0.3	3.14	0.7	9.74
5	"Guardian"	October 17, 2022	0.5	6.91	0.3	3.07	0.8	9.98
6	"The Good Fighter"	October 24, 2022	0.5	6.97	0.3	3.21	0.8	10.18
7	"Love Lost"	November 14, 2022	0.4	6.44	0.3	3.25	0.6	9.69
8	"Turkey Trot"	November 21, 2022	0.4	6.79	—N/a	—N/a	—N/a	—N/a
9	"Higher Education"	December 5, 2022	0.5	6.43	—N/a	—N/a	—N/a	—N/a
10	"Too Many Cooks"	January 9, 2023	0.6	7.93	0.3	3.33	0.8	11.25
11	"Bridges"	January 16, 2023	0.3	6.16	0.3	3.33	0.6	9.49
12	"Big Rig"	January 23, 2023	0.5	7.54	—N/a	—N/a	—N/a	—N/a
13	"Evil Eye"	February 6, 2023	0.5	7.15	—N/a	—N/a	—N/a	—N/a
14	"Old Wounds"	February 13, 2023	0.4	7.05	—N/a	—N/a	—N/a	—N/a
15	"Unusual Suspects"	February 27, 2023	0.5	7.01	—N/a	—N/a	—N/a	—N/a
16	"Butterfly Effect"	March 13, 2023	0.4	7.18	—N/a	—N/a	—N/a	—N/a
17	"Stranger in a Strange Land"	March 20, 2023	0.4	6.60	—N/a	—N/a	—N/a	—N/a
18	"Head Games"	April 10, 2023	0.4	6.84	—N/a	—N/a	—N/a	—N/a
19	"In the Spotlight"	May 1, 2023	0.4	6.81	—N/a	—N/a	—N/a	—N/a
20	"Second Opinion"	May 8, 2023	0.4	6.64	—N/a	—N/a	—N/a	—N/a
21	"Kompromat"	May 15, 2023	0.4	6.66	0.2	3.22	—N/a	9.88
22	"Black Sky"	May 22, 2023	0.4	6.73	0.2	3.33	—N/a	10.06
