= NCIS: Los Angeles season 14 =

NCIS: Los Angeles
- Season 14
- Season 14 U.S. DVD cover
- Starring: Chris O'Donnell; Daniela Ruah; Eric Christian Olsen; Medalion Rahimi; Caleb Castille; Gerald McRaney; LL Cool J
- No. of episodes: 21

Release
- Original network: CBS
- Original release: October 9, 2022 – May 21, 2023

Season chronology
- ← Previous; Season 13

The fourteenth and final season of the American police procedural television series NCIS: Los Angeles premiered on October 9, 2022, on CBS, for the 2022–23 television season, and concluded with its two-part series finale on May 14, and May 21, 2023 respectively. The season contained 21 episodes.

NCIS: Los Angeles follows a fictional team of special agents from the Office of Special Projects of the Naval Criminal Investigative Service. The season stars Chris O'Donnell, Daniela Ruah, Eric Christian Olsen, Medalion Rahimi, Caleb Castille, Gerald McRaney, and LL Cool J. A crossover event with NCIS and NCIS: Hawaiʻi took place during the season in episode 10. Former series regulars Linda Hunt, Peter Cambor, and Renée Felice Smith return for the series finale, although Hunt's return was condensed to a voiceover due to availability issues.

The fourteenth season of NCIS: Los Angeles ranked #27 with a total of 6.42 million viewers.

== Cast and characters ==
=== Main ===
- Chris O'Donnell as Grisha "G." Callen, NCIS Supervisory Special Agent (SSA) and Team leader
- Daniela Ruah as Kensi Blye, NCIS Special Agent
- Eric Christian Olsen as Marty Deeks, NCIS Investigator (Previously LAPD/NCIS Liaison Officer)
- Medalion Rahimi as Fatima Namazi, NCIS Special Agent
- Caleb Castille as Devin Roundtree, NCIS Special Agent (Previously FBI Agent)
- Gerald McRaney as Hollace Kilbride, a retired Admiral and friend of Henrietta Lange, later Operations Manager
- LL Cool J as Sam Hanna, NCIS Senior Field Agent, Second in Command

=== Recurring ===
- Kavi Ramachandran Ladnier as Shyla Dahr, NCIS Reserve Agent
- Natalia del Riego as Rosa Reyes, migrant seeking asylum, later fostered by Kensi and Deeks
- Richard Gant as former Colonel Raymond Hanna, father of Sam
- Bar Paly as Anatasia 'Anna' Kolcheck, Former ATF Agent and Callen's girlfriend, later fiancée
- Duncan Campbell as NCIS Special Agent Castor
- Alicia Coppola as FBI Senior Special Agent Lisa Rand
- Vyto Ruginis as Arkady Kolcheck, former KGB Operative, associate of Callen, and Anna's father
- Bill Goldberg as Lance Hamilton, DOJ Agent
- Erik Palladino as Special Deputy U.S. Marshal Vostanik Sabatino

=== Guest ===
- Linda Hunt as Henrietta "Hetty" Lange (voice only)
- Peter Cambor as Nate Getz
- Renée Felice Smith as Nell Jones
- Sheamus as Quinton

=== Crossover ===
==== NCIS ====
- Gary Cole as Alden Parker, NCIS Supervisory Special Agent of the Major Case Response Team in Washington, D.C.
- Wilmer Valderrama as Nick Torres, NCIS Special Agent

==== NCIS: Hawaiʻi ====
- Vanessa Lachey as Jane Tennant, NCIS Special Agent in Charge of the NCIS: Hawaiʻi Field Office.
- Yasmine Al-Bustami as Lucy Tara, NCIS Special Agent

== Episodes ==
No. overall	No. in season	Title	Directed by	Written by	Original release date	Prod. code	U.S. viewers (millions)
303	1	"Game of Drones"	Kevin Berlandi	R. Scott Gemmill	October 9, 2022	1403	4.33
The team searches for a suspect and their motive following the bombing of a large facility where military combat drones are assembled. Meanwhile, Callen and Killbride get troubling news about Hetty when a body matching her description is found in Syria.
304	2	"Of Value"	Diana C. Valentine	Kyle Harimoto	October 16, 2022	1401	4.07
After an architect duo who specialize in designing secure buildings is kidnapped, the team mounts a search to bring them home. Meanwhile, Deeks and Kensi realize they may need to get Rosa some help with her schoolwork.
305	3	"The Body Stitchers"	Suzanne Saltz	Adam G. Key & Frank Military	October 23, 2022	1402	3.95
The team joins forces with the FBI when a group of grisly murderers known as "The Body Stitchers" returns after evading capture by NCIS years ago. Meanwhile, Sam's dad makes a new friend in Arkady. Note: This episode follows on from "The Monster" NCIS: Los Angeles season 9 episode 17
306	4	"Dead Stick"	Dennis Smith	Lee A. Carlisle	October 30, 2022	1404	5.03
When Aiden Hanna's plane crashes and he is accused of being at fault for the accident, the NCIS team must investigate to clear his name. Meanwhile, Rountree considers how he wants to handle the aftermath of the incident with the LAPD.
307	5	"Flesh & Blood"	Daniela Ruah	Chad Mazero	November 6, 2022	1405	3.56
NCIS is called to investigate when a woman is seen fleeing the scene of her husband's murder. Meanwhile Roberta Deeks comes into town to meet Rosa and Sam looks for another aide for his father.
308	6	"Glory of the Sea"	Terence Nightingall	Faythallegra Claude	November 13, 2022	1406	4.03
NCIS is called to investigate after Rear Admiral Ted Gordon is abducted from his home. Meanwhile, with Deeks off apartment hunting with his mother, Kensi struggles with being the fun parent.
309	7	"Survival of the Fittest"	Eric A. Pot	Andrew Bartels	November 20, 2022	1407	3.93
A Marine falls ill during a training mission due to an attack by a genetic weapon, sending the team on a race to find and stop who's responsible. Meanwhile, Deeks struggles with balancing work and home life when Rosa comes down with the flu.
310	8	"Let It Burn"	Rick Tunell	Indira Gibson Wilson	November 27, 2022	1408	4.03
NCIS investigates an arson attack at Global West Ventures Corp., a naval defense contractor. Meanwhile, Rountree connects with an ex and Kilbride gives Callen files on Pembrook.
311	9	"Blood Bank"	Benny Boom	Samantha Chasse	January 8, 2023	1410	4.56
When NCIS investigates a shootout on a boat in which a rare cultural artifact is stolen, they're shocked to learn who owns the boat.
312	10	"A Long Time Coming"	Dennis Smith	R. Scott Gemmill	January 9, 2023	1409	6.80
As Kilbride goes missing, Fatima and Roundtree are attacked by gunmen led by rogue CIA agent Morgan Miller with the abduction seeing Roundtree being kidnapped. The team continues to work with their D.C. and Hawaii colleagues to find Roundtree, who is tortured for information on Kilbride's whereabouts while the teams learn their identities have been posted on the Dark Web which means every cartel member, hitman, gang and psychopath are also after them to claim the bounties on their heads. Note: This episode concludes a crossover event that begins on NCIS season 20 episode 10 and continues on NCIS: Hawaiʻi season 2 episode 10.
313	11	"Best Seller"	James Hanlon	Kyle Harimoto	January 15, 2023	1411	4.71
When Sam's friend Tom Olsen finds himself being hunted down by enemies from his past, the NCIS team must find out who is after him.
314	12	"In the Name of Honor"	Dan Liu	Matt Klafter	February 19, 2023	1412	3.47
While investigating a missing Navy Lieutenant with ties to a dangerous Islamic militia, Kensi and Fatima are abducted and drugged, waking up inside a car that's due to explode any moment, sending the team into a desperate race against time to find and save them before it's too late.
315	13	"A Farewell to Arms"	John Peter Kousakis; Eric A. Pot	Chad Mazero	February 26, 2023	1413	4.53
When the founder of an AI company is attacked by a mystery woman, the team must identify her before the next major global conflict erupts. Meanwhile, Kilbride receives a visit from his ex-wife who wants him to reconnect with their estranged son.
316	14	"Shame"	Daniela Ruah	Sam Block & Jamil Akim O'Quinn	March 5, 2023	1414	4.28
When a Petty Officer serving on the U.S.S. Allegiance is found with an apparent suicide note, the team is tasked with investigating. Meanwhile, Callen and Anna begin the process of planning their wedding and Sam has a conversation with his daughter, Kam.
317	15	"The Other Shoe"	Eric Wilson	Lee A. Carlisle & Justin Kohlas	March 19, 2023	1415	3.95
When LAPD Detective Ellen Whiting shows up at Kensi and Deeks's house, asking for help in regard to a fellow LAPD Detective who's been murdered, the team investigates a group of potentially corrupt LAPD cops who are connected to a gang dealing drugs on the streets of Los Angeles. Sam goes undercover as a fighter to find out more information.
318	16	"Sleeping Dogs"	Gonzalo Amat	Andrew Bartels	March 26, 2023	1416	4.24
When the team receives an urgent, cryptic message, they discover it's connected to the Drona Project and Pembroke, sending the team on a race to solve the case. Meanwhile, Kilbride plans to finally visit his son who he hasn't seen for ten years, and Callen asks Sam to be the best man at his upcoming wedding.
319	17	"Maybe Today"	Eric A. Pot	Samantha Chasse & Matt Klafter	April 16, 2023	1417	4.30
As Kilbride reconnects with his estranged son Alex, the team assists NCIS's cold case homicide unit on an investigation concerning the disappearance of a Navy Petty Officer in 2003, the case soon turning into a murder investigation.
320	18	"Sensu Lato"	Kevin Berlandi	Faythallegra Claude & Indira Gibson Wilson	April 23, 2023	1418	4.26
The team investigates when a Navy reservist is stabbed and his lab full of pesticides and insects is ransacked. Meanwhile, Kilbride makes Sam an offer and Roundtree begins thinking about his future.
321	19	"The Reckoning"	Frank Military	Frank Military	May 7, 2023	1419	4.49
The team investigates when four people including an officer with the CIA are shot dead in broad daylight with the investigation leading them towards the Drona Project. Callen meets Pembrook who offers insight into Callen's own past. The two later battle to survive against the remaining survivors of the Drona project who seek to kill Pembrook by any means necessary.
322	20	"New Beginnings"	John Peter Kousakis	Kyle Harimoto & R. Scott Gemmill	May 14, 2023	1420	4.15
The team helps the ATF SAC Kerry Adams with an investigation into illegal weapons smuggling, while also investigating if an active undercover ATF agent is a traitor. The episode ends in a cliffhanger with Callen and Sam pinned down by Adams, who is the real traitor. Meanwhile, Rountree's sister Jordyn interviews for candidacy to medical school, Sam tries to persuade his father Raymond to join a drug trial, and Arkady attempts to aid with Callen and Anna's wedding preparations, much to their irritation.
323	21	"New Beginnings, Part Two"	John Peter Kousakis	Kyle Harimoto & R. Scott Gemmill	May 21, 2023	1421	5.24
After surviving the gunfight, Callen and Sam regroup and continue helping their colleagues search for the missing military-grade weapons. After the case has been solved, Callen and Anna decide on an impromptu wedding, attended by friends and family at City Hall. While getting ready, Kensi and Deeks are stunned when they learn they are expecting a baby. During the reception, Callen receives a letter of congratulations from Hetty, who also asks him and Sam to join her for a "side project" in Morocco. Upon their arrival, the two reunite with former colleague Nell Jones, the true sender of the letter, accompanied by Vostanik Sabatino and Nate Getz, preparing to search for Hetty once and for all.: Linda Hunt is credited as a "Special Guest Star".; This is the series finale of NCIS: Los Angeles.

=== Crossovers ===
A crossover event between NCIS: Los Angeles and its fellow NCIS franchise series NCIS and NCIS: Hawaiʻi was in production by CBS. NCIS: Los Angeles stars Chris O'Donnell and LL Cool J participated in the crossover, alongside Gary Cole, Wilmer Valderrama, and Brian Dietzen from NCIS and Vanessa Lachey, Yasmine Al-Bustami, and Noah Mills from NCIS: Hawaiʻi. The crossover event, referred to as the "NCIS-verse crossover", is the first time that all three series have crossed over. The crossover aired on January 9, 2023. NCIS: Los Angeles temporarily moved to Monday for the event and was the third and final part of the crossover. O'Donnell and LL Cool J appeared in all three parts of the event. Cole, Valderrama, Lachey, and Al-Bustami, all appeared in the NCIS: Los Angeles portion, which is entitled "A Long Time Coming". All seven NCIS: Los Angeles cast members also appeared in the NCIS: Los Angeles portion.

== Production ==
=== Development ===
On March 31, 2022, it was announced that CBS had renewed NCIS: Los Angeles for a fourteenth season, alongside renewals for NCIS and NCIS: Hawaiʻi. Cast member Daniela Ruah directed the fifth episode of the season, "Flesh & Blood", as well as the fourteenth. On January 20, 2023, it was announced that the season would end on May 21, 2023. It was also confirmed that it would be the series finale. The decision was based on several factors, specifically, the series' budget having reached its limit.

=== Casting ===
With the renewal in March 2022, it was expected that O'Donnell and LL Cool J would return. Longtime cast member Linda Hunt, who last appeared in the premiere of the previous season, was also expected to return. Each cast member has been absent for four episodes of the season. Returning guest stars for the season include Duncan Campbell, Alicia Coppola, Natalia del Riego, Richard Gant, Bar Paly, Kavi Ramachandran Ladnier, Pamela Reed, and Tye White.

=== Design ===
A new intro and lettering was introduced in Season 14.

=== Unresolved storylines ===
Several multi-episode storylines that were introduced in previous seasons were left unresolved. R. Scott Gemmill explained that he and the writers originally set up plans for a proposed fifteenth season that would have brought closure to the storylines.

== Release and marketing ==
On May 18, 2022, it was announced that the series would move from its previous Sunday 9:00 PM ET timeslot to an hour later at 10:00 PM, leading out of 60 Minutes, The Equalizer, and East New York. On June 23, 2022, the season was given a premiere date of October 9, 2022. In September 2022, the promotional poster for the season was released.

NCIS: Los Angeles Season 14 currently airs on Sky Max in the UK and Ireland, airing every Sunday night at 10pm.

== Ratings ==
Viewership and ratings per episode of NCIS: Los Angeles season 14
No.	Title	Air date	Timeslot (ET)	Rating (18–49)	Viewers (millions)	DVR (18–49)	DVR viewers (millions)	Total (18–49)	Total viewers (millions)
1	"Game of Drones"	October 9, 2022	Sunday; 10:00 p.m.	0.4	4.33	0.2	2.21	0.6	6.55
2	"Of Value"	October 16, 2022	Sunday; 10:41 p.m.	0.4	4.07	0.2	2.08	0.6	6.15
3	"The Body Stitchers"	October 23, 2022	Sunday; 10:00 p.m.	0.3	3.95	0.2	2.00	0.5	5.95
4	"Dead Stick"	October 30, 2022	Sunday; 9:00 p.m.	0.5	5.03	0.2	1.83	0.6	6.86
5	"Flesh & Blood"	November 6, 2022	Sunday; 10:34 p.m.	0.4	3.56	0.2	2.31	0.6	5.88
6	"Glory of the Sea"	November 13, 2022	Sunday; 10:00 p.m.	0.4	4.03	—N/a	—N/a	—N/a	—N/a
7	"Survival of the Fittest"	November 20, 2022	Sunday; 10:48 p.m.	0.4	3.93	—N/a	—N/a	—N/a	—N/a
8	"Let It Burn"	November 27, 2022	Sunday; 10:00 p.m.	0.4	4.03	—N/a	—N/a	—N/a	—N/a
9	"Blood Bank"	January 8, 2023	Sunday; 9:34 p.m.	0.4	4.56	0.2	1.82	0.5	6.38
10	"A Long Time Coming"	January 9, 2023	Monday; 10:00 p.m.	0.5	6.80	0.3	3.16	0.8	9.96
11	"Best Seller"	January 15, 2023	Sunday; 9:00 p.m.	0.3	4.71	0.2	1.80	0.5	6.51
12	"In the Name of Honor"	February 19, 2023	Sunday; 10:00 p.m.	0.2	3.47	—N/a	—N/a	—N/a	—N/a
13	"A Farewell to Arms"	February 26, 2023	Sunday; 10:00 p.m.	0.4	4.53	—N/a	—N/a	—N/a	—N/a
14	"Shame"	March 5, 2023	Sunday; 10:06 p.m.	0.3	4.28	—N/a	—N/a	—N/a	—N/a
15	"The Other Shoe"	March 19, 2023	Sunday; 10:39 p.m.	0.3	3.95	—N/a	—N/a	—N/a	—N/a
16	"Sleeping Dogs"	March 26, 2023	Sunday; 10:39 p.m.	0.3	4.24	—N/a	—N/a	—N/a	—N/a
17	"Maybe Today"	April 16, 2023	Sunday; 10:03 p.m.	0.3	4.30	—N/a	—N/a	—N/a	—N/a
18	"Sensu Lato"	April 23, 2023	Sunday; 10:00 p.m.	0.3	4.26	—N/a	—N/a	—N/a	—N/a
19	"The Reckoning"	May 7, 2023	Sunday; 10:00 p.m.	0.3	4.49	—N/a	—N/a	—N/a	—N/a
20	"New Beginnings"	May 14, 2023	Sunday; 10:00 p.m.	0.3	4.15	—N/a	—N/a	—N/a	—N/a
21	"New Beginnings, Part Two"	May 21, 2023	Sunday; 9:00 p.m.	0.4	5.24	—N/a	—N/a	—N/a	—N/a

== Home media ==
NCIS: Los Angeles: The Final Season
Set details	Special features	
21 episodes; 6-disc set; Media Format: NTSC; Run time: 14 hours and 52 minutes		
DVD release dates
Region 1	Region 2	Region 4
September 5, 2023	TBA	TBA
