= New Beginnings (NCIS: Los Angeles) =

- NCIS: Los Angeles episodes
- Episode nos.: Season 14; Episodes 20 & 21
- Directed by: John Peter Kousakis
- Written by: Kyle Harimoto & R. Scott Gemmill
- Production codes: 1420 (Part 1); 1421 (Part 2)
- Original air dates: May 14, 2023 (Part 1); May 21, 2023 (Part 2)

Guest appearances
- Bar Paly as Anna Kolcheck; Vyto Ruginis as Arkady Kolcheck; Peter Cambor as Nate Getz; Renée Felice Smith as Nell Jones; Erik Palladino as Vostanik Sabatino

Episode chronology
← Previous "The Reckoning"	Next → —
- NCIS: Los Angeles season 14

New Beginnings is the two-part series finale of the American police procedural television series NCIS: Los Angeles. The episodes, which serves as the 20th and 21st episode of the fourteenth season and the 322nd and 323rd episode overall, are written by Kyle Harimoto and R. Scott Gemmill and directed by John Peter Kousakis. The first part aired on May 14, 2023 and the second part aired on May 21, respectively, on CBS.

== Plot ==
=== Part 1 ===
OSP helps the ATF SAC Kerry Adams with an investigation into illegal weapons smuggling, while also investigating if an active undercover ATF agent is a traitor. Meanwhile Rountree's sister Jordyn interviews for candidacy to medical school, Sam tries to persuade his father Raymond to join a drug trial, and Arkady attempts to aid with Callen and Anna's wedding preparations, much to their irritation. The episode ends in a cliffhanger with Callen and Sam pinned down by Adams, who is the real traitor.

=== Part 2 ===
After surviving the gunfight, Callen and Sam regroup and continue helping their OSP colleagues search for the missing military-grade weapons. After the case has been solved, Callen and Anna decide on an impromptu wedding attended by friends and family at City Hall. While getting ready, Kensi and Deeks are stunned when they learn they are expecting a baby. During the reception, Callen receives a letter of congratulations from Hetty, who also asks him and Sam to join her for a "side project" in Morocco. Upon their arrival, the two reunite with former colleague Nell Jones, the true sender of the letter, accompanied by Vostanik Sabatino and Nate Getz, preparing to search for Hetty once and for all.

== Production ==
On January 20, 2023, it was announced that the fourteenth season of NCIS: Los Angeles would be the show's last. The series finale date was originally announced as May 14, 2023. The finale date was bumped to May 21. Both episodes were written by Kyle Harimoto & R. Scott Gemmill and directed by John Peter Kousakis.

=== Original storyline ===
The original version of the finale had Callen and Sam travel to Morocco to rescue Hetty, and would have been meant to set up for a proposed fifteenth season. However, as Linda Hunt was unavailable and CBS announcing in January that the series would end after its fourteenth season, the plot was rewritten to have the NCIS team helping the ATF with a case. R. Scott Gemmill told TV Insider, "If we knew we had another season and Linda had been available, we probably would've gone to rescue Hetty and wound up in trouble and then had to have resolve that in the next season."

== Reception ==
=== Ratings ===
The first part was watched by 4.15 million viewers, while the second part was watched by 5.24 million.

== Future ==
Following the series finale, it was announced on May 22, 2023, that LL Cool J would be joining the recurring cast of NCIS: Hawaiʻi for the third season.
