= List of Hell's Kitchen (American TV series) episodes =

Hell's Kitchen is an American reality television cooking competition (based on the British series of the same name) broadcast on Fox and premiered on May 30, 2005. It is hosted by celebrity chef Gordon Ramsay.

On March 26, 2024, the series was renewed for a twenty-third and twenty-fourth season, with the twenty-third season airing September 2024–February 2025, and the twenty-fourth season airing September 2025–January 2026.

As of October 29, 2026, 385 episodes of Hell's Kitchen have aired, currently in its twenty-fifth season.

== Series overview ==
Season	Subtitle	Episodes	Originally released	
Season	Subtitle	Episodes	First released	Last released
1	—N/a	11	May 30, 2005	August 1, 2005
2	—N/a	11	June 12, 2006	August 14, 2006
3	—N/a	11	June 4, 2007	August 13, 2007
4	—N/a	15	April 1, 2008	July 8, 2008
5	—N/a	15	January 29, 2009	May 14, 2009
6	—N/a	15	July 21, 2009	October 13, 2009
7	—N/a	15	June 1, 2010	August 10, 2010
8	—N/a	15	September 22, 2010	December 15, 2010
9	—N/a	16	July 18, 2011	September 19, 2011
10	—N/a	20	June 4, 2012	September 10, 2012
11	—N/a	22	March 12, 2013	July 25, 2013
12	—N/a	20	March 13, 2014	July 24, 2014
13	—N/a	16	September 10, 2014	December 17, 2014
14	—N/a	16	March 3, 2015	June 9, 2015
15	—N/a	16	January 15, 2016	April 29, 2016
16	—N/a	16	September 23, 2016	February 2, 2017
17	All Stars	16	September 29, 2017	February 2, 2018
18	Rookies vs. Veterans	16	September 28, 2018	February 8, 2019
19	Las Vegas	16	January 7, 2021	April 22, 2021
20	Young Guns	16	May 31, 2021	September 13, 2021
21	Battle of the Ages	16	September 29, 2022	February 9, 2023
22	The American Dream	16	September 28, 2023	January 25, 2024
23	Head Chefs Only	16	September 26, 2024	February 6, 2025
24	Battle of the States	16	September 25, 2025	January 22, 2026
25	25 Seasons of Fire	TBA	September 24, 2026	TBA

== Episodes ==
=== Season 1 (2005) ===
No. overall	No. in season	Title	Original release date	U.S. viewers (millions)
1	1	"Day 1"	May 30, 2005	6.80
2	2	"Day 2"	June 6, 2005	6.98
3	3	"Day 3"	June 13, 2005	7.54
4	4	"Day 4"	June 20, 2005	6.93
5	5	"Day 5"	June 27, 2005	7.13
6	6	"Day 6"	July 11, 2005	5.66
7	7	"Day 7"	July 11, 2005	6.65
8	8	"Day 8"	July 18, 2005	6.70
9	9	"Day 9"	July 25, 2005	7.42
10	10	"Day 10"	August 1, 2005	6.69
11	11	"Day 10"	August 1, 2005	8.94

=== Season 2 (2006) ===
No. overall	No. in season	Title	Original release date	U.S. viewers (millions)
12	1	"12 Chefs"	June 12, 2006	5.89
13	2	"11 Chefs"	June 12, 2006	7.54
14	3	"9 Chefs"	June 19, 2006	7.50
15	4	"8 Chefs"	June 26, 2006	7.97
16	5	"7 Chefs"	July 10, 2006	6.42
17	6	"6 Chefs"	July 17, 2006	7.19
18	7	"5 Chefs"	July 24, 2006	7.45
19	8	"4 Chefs"	July 31, 2006	7.84
20	9	"3 Chefs"	August 7, 2006	8.13
21	10	"2 Chefs"	August 14, 2006	7.63
22	11	"Winner Announced"	August 14, 2006	9.54

=== Season 3 (2007) ===
No. overall	No. in season	Title	Original release date	U.S. viewers (millions)
23	1	"12 Chefs Compete"	June 4, 2007	8.16
24	2	"11 Chefs Compete"	June 11, 2007	8.85
25	3	"10 Chefs Compete"	June 18, 2007	7.57
26	4	"8 Chefs Compete"	June 25, 2007	7.43
27	5	"7 Chefs Compete, Part 1"	July 2, 2007	8.12
28	6	"7 Chefs Compete, Part 2"	July 9, 2007	7.51
29	7	"6 Chefs Compete"	July 16, 2007	8.25
30	8	"5 Chefs Compete"	July 23, 2007	8.89
31	9	"3 Chefs Compete"	July 30, 2007	8.59
32	10	"2 Chefs Compete"	August 6, 2007	8.90
33	11	"Winner Announced"	August 13, 2007	9.68

=== Season 4 (2008) ===
No. overall	No. in season	Title	Original release date	U.S. viewers (millions)
34	1	"15 Chefs Compete"	April 1, 2008	11.85
35	2	"14 Chefs Compete"	April 8, 2008	11.21
36	3	"13 Chefs Compete"	April 15, 2008	10.56
37	4	"12 Chefs Compete"	April 22, 2008	10.98
38	5	"11 Chefs Compete"	April 29, 2008	11.94
39	6	"10 Chefs Compete"	May 6, 2008	11.00
40	7	"9 Chefs Compete"	May 13, 2008	11.31
41	8	"8 Chefs Compete"	May 20, 2008	11.44
42	9	"7 Chefs Compete"	May 27, 2008	9.50
43	10	"6 Chefs Compete"	June 3, 2008	9.36
44	11	"5 Chefs Compete"	June 10, 2008	8.81
45	12	"4 Chefs Compete"	June 17, 2008	8.25
46	13	"3 Chefs Compete"	June 24, 2008	7.80
47	14	"2 Chefs Compete"	July 1, 2008	8.03
48	15	"Winner Announced"	July 8, 2008	8.91

=== Season 5 (2009) ===
No. overall	No. in season	Title	Original release date	U.S. viewers (millions)
49	1	"16 Chefs Compete"	January 29, 2009	10.86
50	2	"15 Chefs Compete"	February 5, 2009	7.71
51	3	"14 Chefs Compete"	February 19, 2009	6.57
52	4	"13 Chefs Compete"	February 26, 2009	9.9
53	5	"12 Chefs Compete"	March 5, 2009	9.71
54	6	"11 Chefs Compete"	March 12, 2009	7.71
55	7	"10 Chefs Compete"	March 19, 2009	7.54
56	8	"9 Chefs Compete"	March 26, 2009	10.13
57	9	"7 Chefs Compete"	April 2, 2009	6.95
58	10	"6 Chefs Compete"	April 9, 2009	7.54
59	11	"5 Chefs Compete"	April 16, 2009	8.11
60	12	"4 Chefs Compete"	April 23, 2009	6.80
61	13	"3 Chefs Compete"	April 30, 2009	6.84
62	14	"2 Chefs Compete"	May 7, 2009	6.50
63	15	"2 Chefs Compete: Part 2"	May 14, 2009	7.37

=== Season 6 (2009) ===
No. overall	No. in season	Title	Original release date	Prod. code	U.S. viewers (millions)
64	1	"16 Chefs Compete"	July 21, 2009	HK-601	6.09
65	2	"15 Chefs Compete"	July 21, 2009	HK-602	6.95
66	3	"14 Chefs Compete"	July 28, 2009	HK-603	7.04
67	4	"13 Chefs Compete"	August 4, 2009	HK-604	6.74
68	5	"12 Chefs Compete"	August 11, 2009	HK-605	6.92
69	6	"11 Chefs Compete"	August 18, 2009	HK-606	7.49
70	7	"10 Chefs Compete"	August 25, 2009	HK-607	7.77
71	8	"9 Chefs Compete"	September 1, 2009	HK-608	7.63
72	9	"8 Chefs Compete"	September 8, 2009	HK-609	7.97
73	10	"7 Chefs Compete"	September 22, 2009	HK-610	6.78
74	11	"6 Chefs Compete"	September 22, 2009	HK-611	6.98
75	12	"5 Chefs Compete"	September 29, 2009	HK-612	6.64
76	13	"4 Chefs Compete"	October 6, 2009	HK-613	7.43
77	14	"3 Chefs Compete"	October 13, 2009	HK-614	8.04
78	15	"Winner Announced" "2 Chefs Compete"	October 13, 2009	HK-615	8.04

=== Season 7 (2010) ===
No. overall	No. in season	Title	Original release date	U.S. viewers (millions)
79	1	"16 Chefs Compete"	June 1, 2010	6.22
80	2	"15 Chefs Compete"	June 8, 2010	6.96
81	3	"13 Chefs Compete"	June 15, 2010	5.67
82	4	"12 Chefs Compete Part 1"	June 15, 2010	6.52
83	5	"12 Chefs Compete Part 2"	June 22, 2010	5.94
84	6	"11 Chefs Compete"	June 22, 2010	6.38
85	7	"10 Chefs Compete"	June 29, 2010	6.00
86	8	"9 Chefs Compete"	June 29, 2010	6.39
87	9	"8 Chefs Compete"	July 6, 2010	6.60
88	10	"7 Chefs Compete"	July 6, 2010	7.20
89	11	"6 Chefs Compete"	July 20, 2010	6.07
90	12	"5 Chefs Compete"	July 20, 2010	6.98
91	13	"4 Chefs Compete Part 1"	July 27, 2010	6.40
92	14	"4 Chefs Compete Part 2"	August 3, 2010	7.15
93	15	"2 Chefs Compete"	August 10, 2010	7.24

=== Season 8 (2010) ===
No. overall	No. in season	Title	Original release date	U.S. viewers (millions)	Recap
94	1	"16 Chefs Compete"	September 22, 2010	5.98	
95	2	"14 Chefs Compete"	September 22, 2010	7.16	
96	3	"13 Chefs Compete"	September 29, 2010	6.08	
97	4	"12 Chefs Compete"	September 29, 2010	6.59	
98	5	"11 Chefs Compete"	October 6, 2010	6.32	
99	6	"10 Chefs Compete"	October 6, 2010	7.00	
100	7	"9 Chefs Compete Part 1"	October 13, 2010	6.30	
101	8	"9 Chefs Compete Part 2"	October 13, 2010	7.36	
102	9	"8 Chefs Compete"	November 10, 2010	5.47	
103	10	"7 Chefs Compete"	November 10, 2010	5.93	
104	11	"6 Chefs Compete"	November 17, 2010	5.92	
105	12	"5 Chefs Compete"	November 24, 2010	5.09	
106	13	"4 Chefs Compete"	December 1, 2010	5.83	
107	14	"4 Chefs Compete Again"	December 8, 2010	5.33	
108	15	"2 Chefs Compete"	December 15, 2010	5.85	

Recaps

=== Season 9 (2011) ===
No. overall	No. in season	Title	Original release date	U.S. viewers (millions)
109	1	"18 Chefs Compete"	July 18, 2011	5.84
110	2	"16 Chefs Compete"	July 19, 2011	5.77
111	3	"15 Chefs Compete"	July 25, 2011	5.95
112	4	"14 Chefs Compete"	July 26, 2011	6.04
113	5	"13 Chefs Compete"	August 1, 2011	5.60
114	6	"12 Chefs Compete"	August 2, 2011	6.32
115	7	"11 Chefs Compete"	August 8, 2011	6.59
116	8	"10 Chefs Compete"	August 9, 2011	6.41
117	9	"9 Chefs Compete"	August 15, 2011	6.99
118	10	"8 Chefs Compete"	August 22, 2011	6.07
119	11	"7 Chefs Compete"	August 22, 2011	6.42
120	12	"6 Chefs Compete"	August 29, 2011	6.21
121	13	"5 Chefs Compete Part 1"	September 5, 2011	5.89
122	14	"5 Chefs Compete Part 2"	September 12, 2011	5.78
123	15	"4 Chefs Compete"	September 19, 2011	6.04
124	16	"2 Chefs Compete"	September 19, 2011	5.94

=== Season 10 (2012) ===
No. overall	No. in season	Title	Original release date	U.S. viewers (millions)
125	1	"18 Chefs Compete"	June 4, 2012	5.46
126	2	"17 Chefs Compete"	June 5, 2012	4.87
127	3	"16 Chefs Compete"	June 11, 2012	6.25
128	4	"15 Chefs Compete"	June 12, 2012	5.32
129	5	"14 Chefs Compete"	June 18, 2012	5.65
130	6	"13 Chefs Compete, Part 1"	June 19, 2012	5.34
131	7	"13 Chefs Compete, Part 2"	June 25, 2012	5.66
132	8	"12 Chefs Compete"	June 26, 2012	5.51
133	9	"11 Chefs Compete Part 1"	July 2, 2012	5.83
134	10	"11 Chefs Compete Part 2"	July 3, 2012	5.07
135	11	"10 Chefs Compete"	July 9, 2012	6.01
136	12	"9 Chefs Compete Part 1"	July 16, 2012	6.33
137	13	"9 Chefs Compete Part 2"	July 17, 2012	6.02
138	14	"8 Chefs Compete"	July 23, 2012	6.46
139	15	"7 Chefs Compete"	July 24, 2012	6.23
140	16	"6 Chefs Compete"	August 13, 2012	6.58
141	17	"5 Chefs Compete"	August 20, 2012	6.23
142	18	"4 Chefs Compete"	August 27, 2012	6.87
143	19	"2 Chefs Compete"	September 4, 2012	6.17
144	20	"Winner Chosen"	September 10, 2012	6.27

=== Season 11 (2013) ===
No. overall	No. in season	Title	Original release date	U.S. viewers (millions)
145	1	"20 Chefs Compete Part 1"	March 12, 2013	5.30
146	2	"20 Chefs Compete Part 2"	March 12, 2013	5.78
147	3	"19 Chefs Compete"	March 19, 2013	4.59
148	4	"17 Chefs Compete"	March 26, 2013	4.68
149	5	"16 Chefs Compete Part 1"	April 2, 2013	4.91
150	6	"16 Chefs Compete Part 2"	April 9, 2013	4.53
151	7	"15 Chefs Compete"	April 16, 2013	4.77
152	8	"14 Chefs Compete"	April 23, 2013	4.83
153	9	"13 Chefs Compete"	April 30, 2013	4.79
154	10	"12 Chefs Compete"	May 7, 2013	4.71
155	11	"10 Chefs Compete"	May 13, 2013	4.19
156	12	"9 Chefs Compete"	May 13, 2013	3.89
157	13	"8 Chefs Compete"	May 23, 2013	5.62
158	14	"7 Chefs Compete Part 1"	May 30, 2013	5.22
159	15	"7 Chefs Compete Part 2"	June 6, 2013	5.28
160	16	"6 Chefs Compete"	June 13, 2013	5.14
161	17	"5 Chefs Compete Part 1"	June 20, 2013	5.19
162	18	"5 Chefs Compete Part 2"	June 27, 2013	5.54
163	19	"5 Chefs Compete Part 3"	July 11, 2013	5.25
164	20	"4 Chefs Compete"	July 18, 2013	4.90
165	21	"2 Chefs Compete"	July 25, 2013	5.29
166	22	"Winner Chosen"	July 25, 2013	5.61

=== Season 12 (2014) ===
No. overall	No. in season	Title	Original release date	U.S. viewers (millions)
167	1	"20 Chefs Compete"	March 13, 2014	5.45
168	2	"19 Chefs Compete"	March 20, 2014	5.34
169	3	"18 Chefs Compete"	March 27, 2014	5.39
170	4	"17 Chefs Compete"	April 3, 2014	4.99
171	5	"16 Chefs Compete"	April 10, 2014	4.17
172	6	"15 Chefs Compete"	April 17, 2014	4.95
173	7	"14 Chefs Compete"	April 24, 2014	4.92
174	8	"13 Chefs Compete"	May 1, 2014	4.47
175	9	"12 Chefs Compete"	May 8, 2014	4.30
176	10	"11 Chefs Compete"	May 15, 2014	4.86
177	11	"10 Chefs Compete"	May 22, 2014	4.34
178	12	"10 Chefs Again"	May 29, 2014	4.54
179	13	"9 Chefs Compete"	June 5, 2014	4.78
180	14	"8 Chefs Compete"	June 12, 2014	4.88
181	15	"7 Chefs Compete"	June 19, 2014	5.13
182	16	"7 Chefs Again"	June 26, 2014	4.95
183	17	"6 Chefs Compete"	July 3, 2014	4.30
184	18	"5 Chefs Compete"	July 10, 2014	4.79
185	19	"4 Chefs Compete"	July 17, 2014	4.95
186	20	"Winner Chosen"	July 24, 2014	5.17

=== Season 13 (2014) ===
No. overall	No. in season	Title	Original release date	U.S. viewers (millions)
187	1	"18 Chefs Compete"	September 10, 2014	4.27
188	2	"17 Chefs Compete"	September 10, 2014	4.21
189	3	"16 Chefs Compete"	September 17, 2014	3.96
190	4	"15 Chefs Compete"	September 24, 2014	3.68
191	5	"14 Chefs Compete"	October 1, 2014	3.89
192	6	"13 Chefs Compete"	October 8, 2014	3.82
193	7	"12 Chefs Compete"	October 15, 2014	3.67
194	8	"11 Chefs Compete, Part 1"	November 5, 2014 (Note: The episode was originally scheduled to air on October 29, 2014, but Fox preempted it due to the ongoing of game 7 of the 2014 World Series.)	3.62
195	9	"11 Chefs Compete, Part 2"	November 12, 2014 (Note: The episode was originally scheduled to air on November 5, 2014, but having been preempted on the previous episode schedule of October 29.)	3.75
196	10	"9 Chefs Compete"	November 19, 2014	3.98
197	11	"8 Chefs Compete"	November 26, 2014	3.48
198	12	"7 Chefs Compete"	December 3, 2014	3.60
199	13	"6 Chefs Compete"	December 10, 2014	3.86
200	14	"5 Chefs Compete"	December 10, 2014	3.86
201	15	"4 Chefs Compete"	December 17, 2014	3.62
202	16	"Winner Chosen"	December 17, 2014	3.60

=== Season 14 (2015) ===
No. overall	No. in season	Title	Original release date	U.S. viewers (millions)
203	1	"18 Chefs Compete"	March 3, 2015	4.09
204	2	"17 Chefs Compete"	March 10, 2015	3.52
205	3	"16 Chefs Compete"	March 17, 2015	3.79
206	4	"15 Chefs Compete"	March 24, 2015	3.77
207	5	"14 Chefs Compete"	March 31, 2015	3.35
208	6	"13 Chefs Compete"	April 7, 2015	3.50
209	7	"12 Chefs Compete"	April 14, 2015	3.63
210	8	"11 Chefs Compete"	April 21, 2015	3.74
211	9	"9 Chefs Compete"	April 28, 2015	3.25
212	10	"8 Chefs Compete"	May 5, 2015	3.75
213	11	"8 Chefs Compete Again"	May 12, 2015	3.26
214	12	"7 Chefs Compete"	May 19, 2015	3.51
215	13	"6 Chefs Compete"	May 19, 2015	3.51
216	14	"5 Chefs Compete"	May 26, 2015	3.33
217	15	"4 Chefs Compete"	June 2, 2015	3.28
218	16	"Winner Chosen"	June 9, 2015	3.42

=== Season 15 (2016) ===
No. overall	No. in season	Title	Original release date	U.S. viewers (millions)
219	1	"18 Chefs Compete"	January 15, 2016	3.41
220	2	"17 Chefs Compete"	January 22, 2016	3.61
221	3	"16 Chefs Compete"	January 27, 2016	4.16
222	4	"15 Chefs Compete"	February 3, 2016	4.60
223	5	"14 Chefs Compete"	February 10, 2016	4.40
224	6	"12 Chefs Compete"	February 17, 2016	3.97
225	7	"11 Chefs Compete"	February 24, 2016	4.23
226	8	"10 Chefs Compete"	March 2, 2016	3.38
227	9	"10 Chefs Again"	March 9, 2016	3.76
228	10	"9 Chefs Compete"	March 16, 2016	3.57
229	11	"8 Chefs Compete"	March 23, 2016	3.54
230	12	"7 Chefs Compete"	April 1, 2016	2.61
231	13	"6 Chefs Compete"	April 8, 2016	2.66
232	14	"5 Chefs Compete"	April 15, 2016	2.98
233	15	"3 Chefs Compete"	April 22, 2016	2.96
234	16	"Winner Chosen"	April 29, 2016	3.13

=== Season 16 (2016–17) ===
No. overall	No. in season	Title	Original release date	U.S. viewers (millions)
235	1	"When the Wall Comes Tumbling Down"	September 23, 2016	3.37
236	2	"Crepe Grand Prix"	September 30, 2016	3.28
237	3	"The Yolks on Them"	October 7, 2016	3.13
238	4	"Surf Riding & Turf Fighting"	October 14, 2016	3.38
239	5	"Walking the Plank"	October 21, 2016	3.38
240	6	"Let the Catfights Begin"	November 4, 2016	3.38
241	7	"Don't Tell My Fiance"	November 11, 2016	3.30
242	8	"Dancing with the Chefs"	November 18, 2016	3.14
243	9	"Spoon Fed"	December 9, 2016	3.31
244	10	"Dancing in the Grotto"	December 16, 2016	3.31
245	11	"Aerial Maneuvers"	January 5, 2017	3.66
246	12	"Fusion Confusion"	January 5, 2017	3.49
247	13	"Black Jacket Lounge"	January 12, 2017	3.97
248	14	"Playing Your Cards Right"	January 19, 2017	3.92
249	15	"Tequila Shots?"	January 26, 2017	3.98
250	16	"Leaving It on the Line"	February 2, 2017	3.67

=== Season 17: All Stars (2017–18) ===
No. overall	No. in season	Title	Original release date	U.S. viewers (millions)
251	1	"All-Stars Arrive"	September 29, 2017	3.02
252	2	"Raising the Bar"	October 6, 2017	2.80
253	3	"Tower of Terror"	October 13, 2017	2.87
254	4	"Just Letter Cook"	October 20, 2017	2.86
255	5	"Josh Josh Josh"	November 3, 2017	3.10
256	6	"A Little Slice of Hell"	November 10, 2017	3.11
257	7	"Trimming Fat"	November 17, 2017	3.21
258	8	"Welcome to the Jungle"	December 1, 2017	2.80
259	9	"Catch of the Day"	December 8, 2017	2.96
260	10	"It's All Gravy"	December 15, 2017	3.04
261	11	"Trying to Pasta Test"	January 5, 2018	3.42
262	12	"Five is the New Black"	January 12, 2018	3.56
263	13	"Stars Heating Up Hell"	January 19, 2018	3.17
264	14	"Families Come to Hell"	January 26, 2018	3.43
265	15	"Final Three"	February 2, 2018	3.36
266	16	"All-Star Finale"	February 2, 2018	3.36

=== Season 18: Rookies vs. Veterans (2018–19) ===
No. overall	No. in season	Title	Original release date	Prod. code	U.S. viewers (millions)
267	1	"Rookies vs. Veterans"	September 28, 2018	HK-1801	2.98
268	2	"A Fond Farewell"	October 5, 2018	HK-1802	2.66
269	3	"Hell's Riders"	October 12, 2018	HK-1803	2.67
270	4	"Hell Freezes Over"	October 19, 2018	HK-1804	2.54
271	5	"Fish Out of Water"	November 2, 2018	HK-1805	2.50
272	6	"Hot Potato"	November 9, 2018	HK-1806	2.82
273	7	"Last Chef Standing"	November 16, 2018	HK-1807	2.81
274	8	"One Hell of a Party"	December 7, 2018	HK-1808	2.68
275	9	"What Happens in Vegas"	December 14, 2018	HK-1809	2.66
276	10	"Poor Trev"	January 4, 2019	HK-1810	2.50
277	11	"Devilish Desserts"	January 11, 2019	HK-1811	2.92
278	12	"Break on Through"	January 18, 2019	HK-1812	2.64
279	13	"An Episode of Firsts"	January 25, 2019	HK-1813	2.66
280	14	"What's Your Motto?"	February 1, 2019	HK-1814	3.08
281	15	"A Rollercoaster Ride"	February 8, 2019	HK-1815	3.17
282	16	"The Grand Finale"	February 8, 2019	HK-1816	3.17

=== Season 19: Las Vegas (2021) ===
No. overall	No. in season	Title	Original release date	Prod. code	U.S. viewers (millions)
283	1	"Welcome to Vegas"	January 7, 2021	HK-1901	2.78
284	2	"Shrimply Spectacular"	January 14, 2021	HK-1902	2.67
285	3	"Hell Caesar!"	January 21, 2021	HK-1903	2.55
286	4	"Wedding Bells in Hell"	January 28, 2021	HK-1904	2.56
287	5	"Hell Starts Taking Its Toll"	February 4, 2021	HK-1905	2.82
288	6	"Metal & Marina"	February 11, 2021	HK-1906	2.50
289	7	"A Pair of Aces"	February 18, 2021	HK-1907	2.74
290	8	"Crapping Out in Hell"	February 25, 2021	HK-1908	2.58
291	9	"Blind Taste Test"	March 4, 2021	HK-1909	2.58
292	10	"There's Something About Marc"	March 11, 2021	HK-1910	2.44
293	11	"Sink or Swim"	March 18, 2021	HK-1911	2.74
294	12	"There's Magic in Hell?"	March 25, 2021	HK-1912	2.85
295	13	"It's Time!"	April 1, 2021	HK-1913	2.62
296	14	"Snuggling with the Enemy"	April 8, 2021	HK-1914	2.63
297	15	"What Happens in Vegas..."	April 15, 2021	HK-1915	2.84
298	16	"Hitting the Jackpot"	April 22, 2021	HK-1916	2.93

=== Season 20: Young Guns (2021) ===
No. overall	No. in season	Title	Original release date	Prod. code	U.S. viewers (millions)
299	1	"Young Guns: Young Guns Come Out Shooting"	May 31, 2021	HK-2001	2.32
300	2	"Young Guns: Temping the Meat"	June 7, 2021	HK-2002	2.55
301	3	"Young Guns: Come Hell or High Water!"	June 14, 2021	HK-2003	2.60
302	4	"Young Guns: Young Guns Going Big"	June 21, 2021	HK-2004	2.60
303	5	"Young Guns: Stirring the Pot"	June 28, 2021	HK-2005	2.42
304	6	"Young Guns: A Ramsay Birthday in Hell!"	July 5, 2021	HK-2006	2.51
305	7	"Young Guns: If You Can't Stand the Heat..."	July 12, 2021	HK-2007	2.60
306	8	"Young Guns: A Devilish Challenge"	July 19, 2021	HK-2008	2.68
307	9	"A Game Show from Hell"	August 9, 2021	HK-2009	2.54
308	10	"More Than a Sticky Situation"	August 16, 2021	HK-2010	2.61
309	11	"Swiping Right"	August 23, 2021	HK-2011	2.54
310	12	"All Hell Breaks Loose"	August 30, 2021	HK-2012	2.61
311	13	"Social Media in Hell"	September 6, 2021	HK-2013	2.20
312	14	"Hell Hath No Fury..."	September 6, 2021	HK-2014	2.09
313	15	"What the Hell"	September 13, 2021	HK-2015	2.36
314	16	"Two Young Guns Shoot It Out"	September 13, 2021	HK-2016	2.23

=== Season 21: Battle of the Ages (2022–23) ===
No. overall	No. in season	Title	Original release date	Prod. code	U.S. viewers (millions)
315	1	"Let the Battle Begin"	September 29, 2022	HK-2101	1.89
316	2	"Just Wingin' It"	October 6, 2022	HK-2102	1.84
317	3	"Clawing Your Way to the Top"	October 13, 2022	HK-2103	1.98
318	4	"Slipping Down to Hell"	October 20, 2022	HK-2104	1.93
319	5	"Breakfast 911"	October 27, 2022	HK-2105	2.12
320	6	"Til Chef Do Us Part"	November 10, 2022	HK-2106	1.94
321	7	"Wok This Way"	November 17, 2022	HK-2107	2.07
322	8	"Game On!"	December 1, 2022	HK-2108	2.07
323	9	"Putting the Carne in Carnival"	December 8, 2022	HK-2109	1.85
324	10	"Everyone's Taco'ing About It"	January 5, 2023	HK-2110	2.22
325	11	"21st Annual Blind Taste Test"	January 12, 2023	HK-2111	2.08
326	12	"What in Hell's Kitchen?"	January 19, 2023	HK-2112	2.16
327	13	"The Fab Five Take Flight"	January 26, 2023	HK-2113	2.27
328	14	"Lights, Camera, Sabotage!"	February 2, 2023	HK-2114	2.05
329	15	"A Finale for the Ages, Part 1"	February 9, 2023	HK-2115	2.29
330	16	"A Finale for the Ages, Part 2"	February 9, 2023	HK-2116	2.29

=== Season 22: The American Dream (2023–24) ===
No. overall	No. in season	Title	Original release date	Prod. code	U.S. viewers (millions)
331	1	"The Dream Begins"	September 28, 2023	HK-2201	1.77
332	2	"Tad Overwhelming"	October 5, 2023	HK-2202	1.99
333	3	"Citizens of Hell's Kitchen"	October 12, 2023	HK-2203	1.83
334	4	"Gimme an H!"	October 19, 2023	HK-2204	1.85
335	5	"Just Bring the DARN Fish!"	October 26, 2023	HK-2205	2.08
336	6	"Fusion Confusion"	November 2, 2023	HK-2206	2.19
337	7	"All Up in Your Grills"	November 9, 2023	HK-2207	1.99
338	8	"Cooking for Your Life"	November 16, 2023	HK-2208	1.98
339	9	"More Bang for Your Buck"	November 30, 2023	HK-2209	2.11
340	10	"The Pastabilities Are Endless"	December 7, 2023	HK-2210	2.05
341	11	"A Hellish Food Fight"	December 14, 2023	HK-2211	2.01
342	12	"A Hell's Kitchen Special Delivery"	January 4, 2024	HK-2212	2.40
343	13	"#HellishHangover"	January 11, 2024	HK-2213	2.35
344	14	"Don't Be Fooled"	January 18, 2024	HK-2214	2.39
345	15	"And Then There Were Two"	January 25, 2024	HK-2215	2.24
346	16	"One Hell of an American Dream"	January 25, 2024	HK-2216	2.00

=== Season 23: Head Chefs Only (2024–25) ===
No. overall	No. in season	Title	Original release date	Prod. code	U.S. viewers (millions)
347	1	"Hell Heads East"	September 26, 2024	HK-2301	1.58
348	2	"The Flame Game"	October 3, 2024	HK-2302	1.50
349	3	"Shucking Hell"	October 10, 2024	HK-2303	1.37
350	4	"In a Pickle"	October 17, 2024	HK-2304	1.48
351	5	"Homesick in Hell"	October 24, 2024	HK-2305	1.51
352	6	"Hell on Wheels"	October 31, 2024	HK-2306	1.72
353	7	"Harmony in Hell"	November 7, 2024	HK-2307	1.54
354	8	"Get a Clue!"	November 14, 2024	HK-2308	1.70
355	9	"Lonely in the Kitchen"	November 21, 2024	HK-2309	1.71
356	10	"A Sticky Situation"	December 5, 2024	HK-2310	1.60
357	11	"A Soap Opera in Hell"	January 2, 2025	HK-2311	1.86
358	12	"Black Jacket Time"	January 9, 2025	HK-2312	1.70
359	13	"Five Comedians Walk into Hell..."	January 16, 2025	HK-2313	1.99
360	14	"Hell at the Pass"	January 23, 2025	HK-2314	1.84
361	15	"One Hell of a Ride"	January 30, 2025	HK-2315	1.94
362	16	"Hell's Finish Line"	February 6, 2025	HK-2316	1.97

=== Season 24: Battle of the States (2025–26) ===
No. overall	No. in season	Title	Original release date	Prod. code	U.S. viewers (millions)
363	1	"Making a State-ment"	September 25, 2025	HK-2401	1.43
364	2	"Hell on a Halfshell"	October 2, 2025	HK-2402	1.73
365	3	"The Heat Is Coming to Hell's Kitchen"	October 9, 2025	HK-2403	1.64
366	4	"There's Something Fishy Going On"	October 16, 2025	HK-2404	1.59
367	5	"A State of Confusion"	October 23, 2025	HK-2405	1.71
368	6	"Hell's Chicken"	October 30, 2025	HK-2406	1.95
369	7	"Guac a mole in Hell's Kitchen"	November 6, 2025	HK-2407	1.61
370	8	"Cook for Your Life"	November 13, 2025	HK-2408	1.58
371	9	"Hell Hath No Fury Like Anaiya Scorned"	November 20, 2025	HK-2409	1.66
372	10	"Is It Steak?"	December 4, 2025	HK-2410	N/A
373	11	"Charity Dinner from Hell"	December 11, 2025	HK-2411	N/A
374	12	"Battle for Black Jackets"	January 1, 2026	HK-2412	N/A
375	13	"Queens of the Kitchen"	January 8, 2026	HK-2413	N/A
376	14	"Who's the Boss"	January 8, 2026	HK-2414	N/A
377	15	"Hell of a Showdown"	January 15, 2026	HK-2415	N/A
378	16	"The Last State Standing Is..."	January 22, 2026	HK-2416	N/A

=== Season 25: 25 Seasons of Fire (2026) ===
No. overall	No. in season	Title	Original release date	Prod. code	U.S. viewers (millions)
379	1	"25th Premiere Party"	September 24, 2026	HK-2501	N/A
380	2	"A Tale of Two Kitchens"	October 1, 2026	HK-2502	N/A
381	3	"Sliding into Hell"	October 8, 2026	HK-2503	N/A
382	4	"Hell's Kitchen University"	October 15, 2026	HK-2504	TBD
383	5	"The Meat of the Matter"	October 22, 2026	HK-2505	TBD
384	6	"A Slice Above the Rest"	October 29, 2026	HK-2506	TBD
385	7	"A Black Tie Affair"	November 5, 2026	HK-2507	TBD
386	8	"Thumb-thing's Cooking"	November 12, 2026	HK-2508	TBD
387	9	"Revolutionary Revenge"	November 19, 2026	HK-2509	TBD
