= Noah Mills =

Canadian model and actor

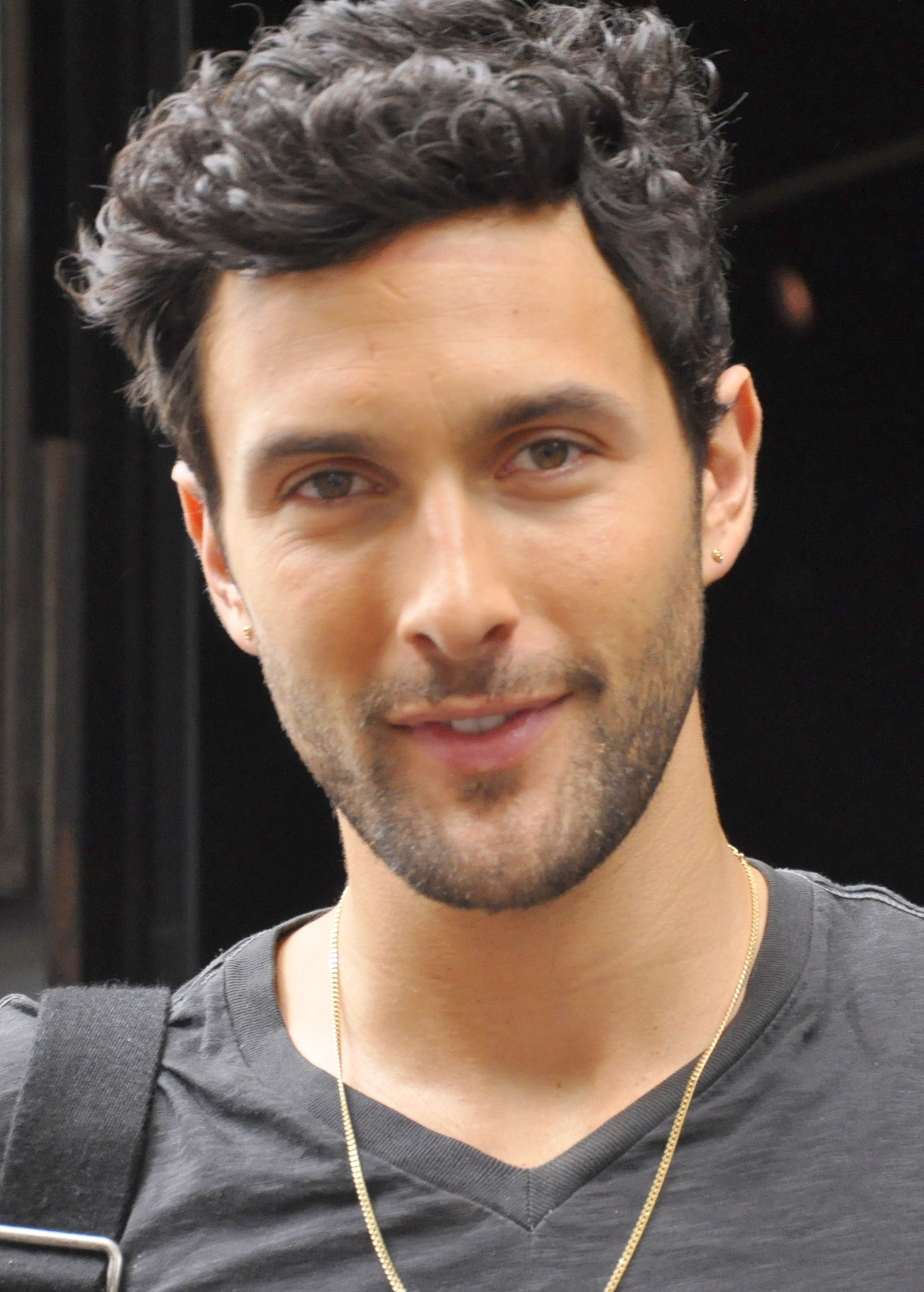
- Mills after the Dolce & Gabbana Summer 2012 Man Show in Milan
- Born: April 26, 1983 (age 43); Toronto, Ontario, Canada
- Occupations: Model; actor
- Years active: 2003–present
- Modelling information
- Height: 6 ft 2 in (1.88 m)
- Hair colour: Brown
- Eye colour: Hazel
- Agency: IMG Models (New York, Los Angeles, Sydney); New Madison (Paris); Elite Model Management (Milan); Select Model Management (London); Sight Management Studio (Barcelona); Louisa Models (Munich)
- Chest: 99 cm / 38 in
- Waist: 81 cm / 31 in

Noah Mills (born April 26, 1983) is a Canadian model and actor. Vogue ranked him as one of the 'Top 10 Male Models of All Time' in September 2014. Mills has been featured in advertisements for Dolce & Gabbana, Tommy Hilfiger, Michael Kors, and Gap Inc. Models.com has called him "one of the most sought after names in the industry." As an actor, he is best known for starring as Jesse Boone on the CBS series NCIS: Hawaiʻi (2021-2024).

== Early life ==
Mills was born in Toronto, Ontario, Canada. He was raised in Baltimore, Maryland, before he went to boarding school in Canada and Australia. After graduating boarding school in Canada, he planned to attend college to study psychology. However, a local scout approached him one day and asked if he'd be interested in modelling. He soon moved to New York and a few weeks later, he booked his first runway show, walking for Gucci.

He is the youngest of five children, with two older brothers and two older sisters.

== Career ==
After beginning his career in 2001, Mills progressed into working with a number of fashion companies, most notably Wilhelmina Models, from which he started his model life. In 2004, Mills made his debut as a runway model for the fall Gucci and Yves Saint Laurent collections in Milan and Paris. In early 2005, he signed a contract with Dolce & Gabbana.

=== Modeling ===
He worked Dolce & Gabbana, Versace and Michael Kors shows for many seasons. In 2009, Mills appeared in the naked Dolce & Gabbana Anthology Fragrance campaign with a number of other models including Claudia Schiffer, Naomi Campbell and Tyson Ballou.

Mills became one of the models to star in Lacoste's "new look" campaign in January 2011, a different advertising concept under the new tagline, "Unconventional Chic". The ads were shot by Mert and Marcus, showing models wearing white Lacoste polo shirts worn over fancy black evening wear.

In 2012, Mills was ranked number three in "The Money Guys" by Models.com. In the 2013 ranking, he was ranked number five.

In 2013, Forbes named him one of the world's best-paid male models.

Mills was featured as one of the faces in Details' September 2015 issue, for cover model along with thirty other top male models, which was photographed by Mark Seliger.

=== Acting ===
In 2010, he appeared in Sex and the City 2 opposite Kim Cattrall's character, Samantha Jones.

In 2011 and 2012, Mills appeared in the CBS sitcom 2 Broke Girls, playing the role of Robbie, Max's (Kat Dennings) boyfriend. He also acted in Taylor Swift's 2012 video for "We Are Never Ever Getting Back Together" as her former love interest.

In 2012, Mills starred in Candyland, a 19-minute art film written and directed by Jouri Smit, about the extent to which prescription drug abuse has reached epidemic levels.

In 2013, Mills starred in WRACKED, a short film directed by Victoria Mahoney, which he also wrote and co-produced. Mills plays Sean, who comes home after serving a five-year prison sentence and must contend with "the remains of a life interrupted." For this role, Mills won the best actor prize in the 2013 Golden Egg Film Festival. The film was also nominated for Best Short and Best Supporting Actor (Beau Knapp).

In 2018, Mills co-starred with Mike Vogel and Anne Heche in the NBC military drama The Brave as Sgt. Joseph "McG" McGuire, a combat medic working within an elite group of army intelligence officers. In 2019, Mills starred in NBC's crime thriller The Enemy Within as Special Agent Jason Bragg, alongside Jennifer Carpenter and Morris Chestnut. Both shows were cancelled after one season.

In 2020, Mills appeared in the Disney+ superhero series The Falcon and the Winter Soldier.

In 2021, Mills was cast in the main role of Special Agent Jesse Boone in the CBS crime drama series NCIS: Hawaiʻi. The series ended in 2024 after three seasons.

In 2025, Mills joined the cast of CBS medical-mystery drama Watson in a recurring role, reuniting with his The Enemy Within co-star Morris Chestnut. The series ended in 2026 after two seasons.

== Filmography ==
Film
Year	Title	Role	Notes
2010	The Best Man	Syd	Short film
2010	Sex and the City 2	Nicky Marentino	
2011	Happy New Year	Looch	
2012	Candyland	Jack Smith	Short film
2013	Wracked	Sean	Short film
2014	Me	Mills	
2015	A Fisher of Men	The Fisherman	Short film
2018	Santa's Boots	Nick	Lifetime film

Television
Year	Title	Role	Notes
2011, 2012	2 Broke Girls	Robbie	3 episodes
2017–18	The Brave	Sergeant Joseph "McG" McGuire	Main cast
2019	PEN15	Flymiamibro22	Episode: "AIM"
2019	The Enemy Within	Jason Bragg	Main cast
2020	The Baker and the Beauty	Colin Davis	3 episodes
2021	The Falcon and the Winter Soldier	Nico	2 episodes
2021–24	NCIS: Hawaiʻi	Special Agent Jesse Boone	Main cast
2023	NCIS	Special Agent Jesse Boone	Crossover: "Too Many Cooks"
2025-2026	Watson	Beck Whythe	Recurring

Music Videos
Year	Title	Role	Artist
2012	"We Are Never Ever Getting Back Together"	Ex-Boyfriend	Taylor Swift
