= List of NCIS: Los Angeles characters =

This is an overview of regular and recurring characters on the TV series NCIS: Los Angeles.

== Overview ==
=== Main characters ===
Actor	Character	Position	Seasons													
Actor	Character	Position	1	2	3	4	5	6	7	8	9	10	11	12	13	14
Chris O'Donnell	G. Callen	NCIS Special Agent-in-Charge	Main	Main	Main	Main	Main	Main	Main	Main	Main	Main	Main	Main	Main	Main
Peter Cambor	Nate Getz	NCIS Special Agent and Operational Psychologist	Main	R	G	G	G	G	G	G	—	—	—	—	R	G
Daniela Ruah	Kensi Blye	NCIS Special Agent	Main	Main	Main	Main	Main	Main	Main	Main	Main	Main	Main	Main	Main	Main
Linda Hunt	Hetty Lange	NCIS Operations Manager	Main (Note: Episodes 2–24 of season 1 only; guest episode 1.)	Main	Main	Main	Main	Main	Main	Main	Main	Main	Main	Main	G	G
Adam Jamal Craig	Dominic Vail	NCIS Probationary Junior Special Agent	Main (Note: Episodes 1–12 of season 1 only; guest episode 21.)	—	—	—	—	—	—	—	—	—	—	—	—	—
LL Cool J	Sam Hanna	NCIS Senior Special Agent	Main	Main	Main	Main	Main	Main	Main	Main	Main	Main	Main	Main	Main	Main
Barrett Foa	Eric Beale	NCIS Technical Operator	Main (Note: Episodes 13–24 of season 1 only; recurring episode 1–12.)	Main	Main	Main	Main	Main	Main	Main	Main	Main	Main	Main	—	—
Eric Christian Olsen	Marty Deeks	NCIS Investigator	G	Main	Main	Main	Main	Main	Main	Main	Main	Main	Main	Main	Main	Main
Renée Felice Smith	Nell Jones	NCIS Special Agent / NCIS Technical Analyst	—	Main (Note: Episodes 13–24 of season 2 only; recurring episodes 1–12.)	Main	Main	Main	Main	Main	Main	Main	Main	Main	Main	—	G
Miguel Ferrer	Owen Granger	NCIS Assistant Director	—	—	R	R	Main (Note: Episodes 1–15 of season 8 only.)	Main	Main	Main	—	—	—	—	—	—
Nia Long	Shay Mosley	NCIS Executive Assistant Director Pacific	—	—	—	—	—	—	—	—	Main (Note: Episodes 1–6 of season 10 only.)	Main	—	—	—	—
Medalion Rahimi	Fatima Namazi	NCIS Special Agent	—	—	—	—	—	—	—	—	—	R	Main (Note: Episodes 16 onwards of season 11 only; recurring episodes 4, 6 & 7.)	Main	Main	Main
Caleb Castille	Devin Rountree	NCIS Junior Special Agent	—	—	—	—	—	—	—	—	—	—	R	Main	Main	Main
Gerald McRaney	Hollace Kilbride	NCIS Operations Manager	—	—	—	—	—	G	—	—	—	R	G	R	Main	Main

=== Recurring characters ===
Character	Actor	Season												
Character	Actor	1	2	3	4	5	6	7	8	9	10	11	12	13
Leon Vance	Rocky Carroll	R	G	G	—	—	G	—	—	—	—	—	—	—
Abby Sciuto	Pauley Perrette	R	—	—	—	—	—	—	—	—	—	—	—	—
Rose Schwartz	Kathleen Rose Perkins	R	G	—	R	—	—	—	—	—	—	—	—	—
Arkady Kolcheck	Vyto Ruginis	G	G	G	R	G	R	R	G	R	R	G	R	R
Mowahd Dusa	Ronald Auguste	R	G	—	—	—	—	—	—	—	—	—	—	—
Dan Evans	Matthew Grant Godbey	G	G	R	—	G	—	—	R	—	—	—	—	—
Lauren Hunter	Claire Forlani	—	R	R	—	—	—	—	—	—	—	—	—	—
Marcel Janvier	Christopher Lambert	—	—	R	R	G	—	—	—	—	—	—	—	—
Tahir Khaled	Anslem Richardson	—	—	R	—	—	—	R	R	—	—	—	—	—
Vostanik Sabatino	Erik Palladino	—	—	G	G	R	—	G	R	—	G	G	R	G
Michelle Hanna	Indira G. Wilson	—	—	G	—	—	—	—	—	—	—	—	—	—
Michelle Hanna	Aunjanue Ellis	—	—	—	R	G	G	—	G	—	—	—	—	—
Dave Flynn	Scott Grimes	—	—	—	R	—	—	—	G	—	—	—	—	—
Jack Simon	Matthew Del Negro	—	—	—	—	R	—	G	—	—	—	—	—	—
Joelle Taylor	Elizabeth Bogush	—	—	—	—	G	R	G	R	G	G	—	G	R
Anna Kolcheck	Bar Paly	—	—	—	—	—	R	R	R	R	R	R	R	R
Anthony "Tony" DiNozzo Jr.	Michael Weatherly	—	—	—	—	—	—	G	—	—	—	—	—	—
Jennifer Kim	Malese Jow	—	—	—	—	—	—	R	—	G	—	—	—	—
A.J. Chegwidden	John M. Jackson	—	—	—	—	—	—	—	R	R	—	—	—	—
Harley Hidoko	Andrea Bordeaux	—	—	—	—	—	—	—	—	R	—	—	—	—
Louis Ochoa	Esai Morales	—	—	—	—	—	—	—	—	—	R	—	—	—
John Rogers	Peter Jacobson	—	—	—	—	—	—	—	—	—	R	G	G	—

== Main characters ==
=== G. Callen ===
Grisha Aleksandrovich Nikolaev Callen
- NCIS: Los Angeles character
- Chris O'Donnell as G. Callen
- First appearance: "Legend (Part 1)"
- Portrayed by: Chris O'Donnell; C.J. Valleroy (aged 15)
- Other appearances: NCIS – "Legend (Part I)" "Legend (Part 2)"; Hawaii Five-0 – "Pa Make Loa"; NCIS: Hawaiʻi – "Deep Fake"

In-universe information
- Full name: Grisha Aleksandrovich Nikolaev
- Nickname: G.
- Gender: Male
- Title: Special Agent-in-Charge
- Occupation: NCIS Special Agent
- Family: Nikita Aleksandr Reznikov (father, deceased); Clara Callen (mother, deceased); Amy Callen (older sister, deceased); George Callen (grandfather, deceased); Alexandra Reynolds (half sister); Jake Reynolds (nephew)
- Significant others: Anna Kolcheck (wife); Kristen Donnelly (ex-girlfriend); Joelle Taylor (ex-girlfriend)
- Nationality: Romanian, American, Russian

Agent Grisha "G." Callen (born: Nikolaev) (portrayed by Chris O'Donnell) is the NCIS Special Agent in Charge, and the senior agent assigned to the Office of Special Projects. He first appeared in the NCIS season six episode "Legend (Part I)".

Before working at NCIS, Callen previously worked for the CIA (the longest), DEA, and FBI. Several episodes across the seasons reference his stint with the Agency. In seasons one and two, it is revealed that while with the CIA, Callen worked alongside recurring NCIS character Trent Kort (David Dayan Fisher), and was partnered with Tracy Rosetti (Marisol Nichols). Callen once served with his friend Leroy Jethro Gibbs, who now works at the NCIS Headquarters located in the Washington Navy Yard. Callen specializes in deep undercover work. Prior to the series commencing, G. Callen and Sam Hanna had been partnered for two years (as per the season three episode "Partner" where they celebrate their five-year partnership).

In the show's first episode "Identity", it is revealed that he is called "G" not because he dislikes his first name, but because he does not actually know what it stands for, as the system never told him. Further insights into his childhood come in season one's "Pushback", where Hetty Lange and operational psychologist Dr. Nate Getz discuss how Callen lived in thirty-seven foster homes from the age of five to the age of eighteen, sometimes moving every few days. Callen's childhood was fraught with abuse, which is referenced during various episodes. In season one ("Keeping It Real") he recalls that he once watched his foster father beat his foster brother to death. In season four, he shares how moving unexpectedly to a new home that wasn't quite so nice, made him close off his feelings. In "Reznikov, N." (season five), Callen tells Kensi and Deeks that when he was ten, his foster father used to beat him with a broom handle.

Over the course of several seasons, Callen has discovered more about his identity and flashbacks in the season two finale prompted him to suddenly recall that he spent part of his early childhood on the Romanian coast of the Black Sea. He also uncovers repressed memories of witnessing his mother being assassinated in front of him when he was four. Early in season three, Hetty finally tells Callen that she knew his mother, Clara and she was her CIA handler. Callen's maternal line back to his grandfather George Callen is revealed, as well as the Romanian blood feud between the Callens and the Comescus.

In addition to English, Callen is fluent in at least six other languages: Spanish, Polish, Russian, German (which is claimed to be Austrian German, and is usually completely butchered), Italian (with a Northern accent), and French. Callen also claims to speak Czech and Romanian; furthermore, his Russian is arguably good enough to be taken for one, but not the other, Chechen dialect. In the Season 1 episode "Search and Destroy" (S1:E4), Callen is shown easily reading Arabic, with enough fluency to translate on the fly into idiomatic English.

=== Nate "Doc" Getz ===
Nate "Doc" Getz
- First appearance: "Legend (Part 1)" (NCIS episode)
- Last appearance: "New Beginnings, Part 2"
- Portrayed by: Peter Cambor

In-universe information
- Nicknames: Nate, Doc
- Gender: Male
- Title: Operational Liaison in the Middle East
- Occupation: Operational Psychologist
- Nationality: American

Dr. Nate Getz (portrayed by Peter Cambor) is an operational psychologist working with NCIS, stationed in Los Angeles, introduced in the series' backdoor pilot, the NCIS episode "Legend". Nate holds both a master's degree and Ph.D. in psychology.

He observes surveillance tapes and watches/handles interrogations in order to make a psychological profile. He is also responsible for performing periodic psychological evaluations of the NCIS OSP personnel and to provide ongoing monitoring of their mental health. He is afraid of disobeying orders from Hetty Lange and finds her scary. The team often fails to get his humor, for example, in "The Only Easy Day" when he states: "What has the world come to when drug dealers aren't even safe within the comfort of their own fortified homes?" He also knows how to play banjo and harmonica, and enjoys listening to jazz music. In the episode "Callen, G" he claims he was abducted by aliens as a child.

In the episode "Chinatown", Nate expresses his interest in becoming a field agent which is highly discouraged by the team members because of his inept field skills. He asks Hetty if she can think of any operational psychologist who has become a field agent; however, when she shares that the only known such person died on his second week of field work, Nate gets a little iffy about his choice. Despite this, Nate has received training in both fieldcraft and hand-to-hand combat, as demonstrated on several occasions in the episodes "Lockup" and "Harm's Way".

Nate and recurring character Rose Shwartz share an unconsummated mutual attraction. This has not been explored further as Peter Cambor is no longer a member of the main cast. Cambor's departure as a main cast member coincides with Nate's reassignment to the Middle East to investigate an Islamic militant group based in Yemen. With the conclusion of that mission in the episode "Harm's Way", Nate's current assignment is undisclosed, although it is known that he is remaining in the Middle East for the time being.

Nate returned to Los Angeles in "Patriot Acts" where he helped the team locate a domestic terrorist responsible for planting a bomb somewhere in the city. In "The 3rd Choir" he helps Nell to cope with her first kill.

Peter Cambor was credited as a main cast member during season one, but his character was downgraded to recurring at the start of season two. In his future appearances, Cambor was credited as a Special Guest Star.

=== Kensi Blye ===
Kensi Blye
- First appearance: "Legend (Part I)" (NCIS episode)
- Last appearance: "New Beginnings, Part 2" (NCIS: Los Angeles episode)
- Portrayed by: Daniela Ruah
- Other appearances: Hawaii Five-0; NCIS

In-universe information
- Full name: Kensi Marie Blye
- Nicknames: Kens; Sugarbear (by Deeks); Fern (by Deeks); Kensilina (by Deeks); Wikipedia (by Ray); Kay-Kay (by Deeks and the Cupcake Girls); Special K Princess (by Deeks)
- Gender: Female
- Title: Special Agent
- Occupation: Junior Field Special Agent (NCIS)/Special Agent (NCIS); Bar owner
- Family: Donald Blye (father; deceased); Julia Feldman (mother); Gordon John Brandel (father-in-law; deceased); Roberta Deeks (mother-in-law); Rosa (adoptive daughter)
- Spouse: Marty Deeks (husband)
- Significant others: Jack Simon (ex-fiancé); Kevin Miller (ex-boyfriend)
- Nationality: American

Kensi Blye (portrayed by Daniela Ruah) is a Junior Field Agent in the NCIS Office of Special Projects Team stationed in Los Angeles.

Kensi was originally named "Kensi Lo" and described as "a twenty-something Asian-American whose academic record in forensics and criminology got her recruited young by the Feds"; a change was needed when Portuguese actress Daniela Ruah was cast.

Kensi Marie Blye was born in San Diego, California on July 29, 1982. She came from a U.S. Marine Corps family and still drives to Camp Pendleton every weekend. At some point her father was stationed at Camp Lejeune during her childhood. She is fluent in Portuguese, French, and Spanish, can lip-read and knows Morse code. In the episode "Borderline" she also stated that her father taught her how to "track, shoot, fix an engine, play poker, wire a house; basically anything you teach a son", and that her father was her best friend. In that same scene she reveals that her "father didn't have any sons, just me" implying that she is an only child. She has admitted to having Chaetophobia (fear of hair), specifically fear of men's back hair. She collects gel bracelets and is known to have at least seventy-two. She is also known to be a slob; her desk is frequently covered in clutter and her home is shown to be quite messy. Her untidy habits are a recurring joke throughout the series.

When she was fifteen years old and out seeing the movie Titanic with friends, a movie Kensi considers to be her favorite, her father was murdered. His body was so unrecognizable that he had to be identified through the use of dental records. It had been a cold case for many years, but in the episode "Blye, K., Part 2" it was finally solved and Kensi was able to move on with her life at last. It was subsequently revealed that after her father's murder, she spent almost a year living on the streets.

Kensi joined the Naval Criminal Investigative Service in August 2006, according to her NCIS agent biography form from "Black Market" after having graduated from Cornell University with a BA in Politics and International Studies. According to the form, her first posting was the Washington DC Office, December 2006 to September 2007, then Tokyo 7th Fleet HQ from October 2007 to March 2008. After that she was stationed at Norfolk Naval Base, Virginia from March 2008 to June 2009. She started at OSP in Los Angeles in June 2009.

In "The Only Easy Day", Kensi says that when she was the new girl, she had to climb through air ducts because she was the smallest, and also had to wear bikinis on assignment when needed. She is very talented with undercover work, and Callen and Sam have called her a "natural operator". She is fluent in Spanish, Portuguese, English, and French. Her husband is Martin Deeks.

On-screen, her first partner was Agent Dom Vail. She was particularly upset when Dom went missing and she was seen afterwards washing dishes at his apartment. Kensi has been officially partnered with Marty Deeks since season two, although their first experience working together was in the season one episode "Fame".

It is revealed in the season two episode "Disorder" that she was once engaged to a Marine named Jack, but that their relationship ended after his return from Iraq suffering from posttraumatic stress disorder (PTSD) and his subsequent disappearance. Kensi tried to be there for him (stating that she helped with his medication, and even went to his psychiatric appointments), but all of her efforts weren't enough since Jack was too affected. It is said that he eventually left her without even telling her. She is even shown crying in the interrogation room to the suspect (proving that she obviously had a deep connection to him, and is still greatly affected by the loss). Although Deeks and Kensi have a somewhat antagonistic relationship at first, they have warmed up considerably over time, and she was visibly concerned when Deeks was shot in the episode "Personal". Kensi asks Hetty if she can stay with Deeks in the hospital rather than assist in the investigation of his shooting, as she didn't want to risk not seeing him alive again, as had happened with Vail. Deeks is also a flirter and he has demonstrated some interest in Kensi on a personal level. In the episode "The Job", while undercover, she had to flirt with a good-looking thief. Deeks showed jealousy, as noted by Callen and Sam.

Kensi is visibly annoyed sometimes when Deeks flirts with other women or when he attempts to use her as a wingman. During some episodes, though, Kensi appears slightly jealous when Deeks flirts with other women or when they come across someone he once had feelings for while undercover. Over time it becomes obvious that Kensi is developing feelings for Deeks, though she often hides them. Like Deeks, Kensi also has a comic book collection. In the season two episode "Plan B" Kensi earns the nickname Wikipedia for her encyclopedic knowledge. In the season two finale, Kensi resigns from NCIS along with Callen and Sam in order to follow Hetty's trail to Prague without Director Vance's authorization.

In the season three episode "Blye, K.", Kensi falls under investigation when Marines from her dead father's sniper unit end up dead in various car accidents. Kensi's father Donald Blye was part of a special operations unit named "Oscar-Sierra". She is taken into custody by Assistant Director Granger when it is revealed that she was the last person a few Marines contacted before their deaths, although her name is eventually cleared when it becomes apparent that the true killer is a former member of her father's sniper unit who faked his own death. In season four, Hetty tells Deeks that Kensi lived on the streets for about a year after her father's death. This event appears to have scarred her emotionally, although she has never gone into details as to the events that took place while on the streets. In "Blye, K., Part 2", it is revealed that her mother (remarried as Julia Feldman) lives in Encino and they haven't spoken in 15 years. In the same episode, it is revealed that Kensi joined NCIS in 2006, nine years after the death of her father. She was 24 years old at the time. Granger accuses Kensi of joining NCIS to fulfill her own agenda, i.e. to investigate her father's death. Donald Blye died trying to protect an American journalist named Brad Stevens who was about to expose Peter Clairemont (chief of the Oscar-Sierra unit) who had killed a civilian while intoxicated. At the end of the episode, much to Kensi's surprise, it was revealed that her father and Granger were close associates.

Kensi also has an affinity for Dubstep and techno music. Deeks mentions it early on in season three and she is found listening to it while undercover in episode 22 of season three, "Neighborhood Watch". Kensi also made a guest appearance in the Hawaii Five-0 episode "Ka Hakaka Maikaʻi" where she announced that she has Level 5 security clearance.

In the episode "Parley", while Deeks is undercover with a woman named Monica, Kensi appears jealous of how close Monica is to him. While Kensi is preparing Monica for a meeting with an arms dealer, Monica asks whether being Deeks' partner is enough for her. Kensi seems uptight and tries to avoid answering the question. Monica then goes on to tell her that he can't be trusted; Kensi defends Deeks by saying "I trust him with everything". Later Kensi goes to talk to Deeks and he asks her if she is good. She replies by saying she is good and asks Deeks the same question. He replies by saying "I'm good if you're good". Though they both say everything is fine between them, they both seem to be lying and are obviously not fine. By the end of the season, Deeks and Kensi finally begin to confront their true feelings for each other and share their first real kiss.

In this season, Kensi and Deeks finally begin to truly confront their romantic feelings for each other, but face various obstacles that continue to keep them apart or discuss their true feelings. In the opening episode of season five, Kensi is both comforted and deeply affected by the fact that Deeks used her as a tether to withstand the torture he had endured. While Deeks is recovering, Kensi states that she attempted to bring him his favorite doughnut/croissant (a.k.a. "Cronut"). She is clearly distraught by his lack of response, even to this gesture. After Nate is called to assess Deeks' mental status, it is Kensi who is finally able to give him the sleep he has thus far been unable to attain, when she goes to visit him at his house. In the episode "Recovery", it is implied that Kensi and Deeks have become intimate after he told her he wanted to be with her at his apartment and she stared at him before walking off, with him following right behind her. However, following their night together in the episode "Frozen Lake", things become awkward and full of tension when their entangled emotions begin to have an effect on their performance during field work. When Deeks does not take a most-needed shot, Kensi becomes agitated and tells Deeks she is standing on a "frozen lake" and that while she wants what they have more than anything else, it just won't work. Despite this, at the end of the episode, Kensi tells Deeks they'll find a way to work things out between them, admitting they have a "thing", before asking him to be patient with her as they talk things through. He agrees to that and they make plans to meet again that night. As Kensi waits for Deeks later on, though, Hetty tells her she has been reassigned to a new and classified mission and will have to leave until the job is finished, much to her disappointment. As she prepares to leave, she receives a text message from Deeks saying he is almost there. She appears genuinely upset and walks off.

In Afghanistan, she receives her mission: to kill an American man who uses the alias "White Ghost". She discovers that the "White Ghost" is apparently Jack Simon, her ex-fiancé. Simon had PTSD returning from the war and left her on Christmas morning (season two "Disorder"). Because of her personal connection, she is unable to kill him and eventually gets captured. It is revealed that this was a plan crafted by Hetty to protect Jack, who is innocent, from the CIA. When the team hears news of Kensi's capture they rush to her aid, only to find her pale, weak and having been very severely beaten. This is a direct parallel to what Deeks went through at the beginning of season five. Kensi prefers not to talk about it, although she does confide in Deeks and he embraces her when she says "It was really bad." (The Afghanistan storyline was actually not originally part of the plan for season 5, but added to keep Blye on the show despite actress Ruah's pregnancy.)

In season six episode 11 "Humbug", she and Deeks agree to make their relationship official and finally become a couple. They attempt to keep their relationship secret until the events of episode 18 "Fighting Shadows" when the team reveal their awareness of their newfound romantic relationship. In the same episode, Kensi and Deeks are also briefly separated and must work with Callen and Sam respectively, but later discover the reason being that Deeks is under investigation by the LAPD who will try and use their relationship against them.

In season seven, Kensi decides to move in with Deeks.

Towards the end of the season, Callen, Sam, Kensi and Deeks go to the desert to capture a terrorist and their plane gets shot down and in the wreckage Kensi gets stuck under the nose of the plane and goes into a coma. The aftermath of the injury results in a spinal cord injury with a very slim chance of recovery.

In the first episode, Kensi gets injured because the team was involved in a helicopter crash. For the first half of the season, Kensi is out of action in hospital, recovering and doing therapy following her accident. After months of physical therapy she does eventually return to work, once Hetty and Nate both agree she is ready. In episode 14, Kensi is kidnapped by a man she met in physical therapy (who is later revealed to have been one of the people she shot in Season 5 during her trek into Afghanistan, making her directly responsible for his amputation). In episode 15, she is taken to a house where the man threatens to cut off her leg as "payback" but Deeks saves her. At the end of the season finale, Kensi asks Deeks to marry her and he says yes.

In season nine, Kensi and Deeks are officially engaged and begin planning for the wedding while at the same time meet executive assistant director, Shay Mosley who replaces Owen Granger. Mosley is shown to disapprove of Kensi and Deeks' relationship when she sends Deeks back to work at the LAPD, temporarily breaking their partnership until Callen convinces Mosley to keep Deeks on the team. Throughout the season, Kensi and Deeks continue making plans and preparations for their wedding and at the same time, start discussing their future together beyond NCIS with Deeks expressing his hopes of someday leaving with Kensi to start a family together. During the season, Kensi is faced in a deadly and highly dangerous situation involving a nuclear launch and almost risking her life. Kensi is successful in stopping the threat.

In the season nine finale, Kensi along with the rest of the team, learn the truth about Mosley's kidnapped son and Callen's promise to help her when they come into contact with a suspect on a current case who is connected to Mosley's former lover, Spencer Williams. Upon learning of this information, Mosley sees this as her best chance of finding and getting her son back. Mosley and the team learn they are located in Mexico, but the mission to rescue her son is unsanctioned and highly dangerous, putting the team's lives at risk. Kensi wishes to go to Mexico, but Deeks has concerns and does not believe it is a good idea. When Deeks is fired by Mosley after confronting her about her unfair, reckless and disrespectful behaviour, he believes that now is the time for him and Kensi to finally leave NCIS. However, despite their previous discussions on the matter, Kensi reveals that she is not ready to leave NCIS or start a family yet. A fight ensues between them, resulting in the wedding being called off. Despite being fired as well as the current state of their relationship, Deeks still joins the team on the Mexico mission to save Mosley's son. However, while the mission is ultimately successful, reuniting Mosley with her son and returning them to L.A. together, the rest of the team are struck by a rocket while escaping in their SUV, leaving uncertain who is dead or alive.

Shortly after the events from the season nine finale, Kensi and the team are revealed to have survived the impact from the rocket that hit their SUV. Kensi is the least injured member of the team, but becomes extremely worried when Deeks has since remained unconscious following the SUV explosion. The team are forced to separate and Kensi drags an unconscious Deeks through the desert to find safety and shelter, but Kensi continues to remain worried about Deeks. Eventually, Deeks awakens and Kensi manages to get to a hospital. Kensi reunites with Turk and together they stand guard and get ready for a fight from Spencer Williams men who are still hunting the team. Thankfully, help arrives and Kensi remains by Deeks' side as he is being treated from his injuries. By the end of the premiere, Kensi and Deeks finally reconcile from their previous fight from the season nine finale, getting back together and resuming their engagement.

Kensi and Deeks continue to plan their wedding throughout the tenth season and later open up their bar. Towards the end of the season, Kensi and Deeks' wedding day has arrived. However, Kensi remains unaware of the events regarding Anatoli Kirkin and while the rest of the team deals with the situation, Kensi is busy getting ready along with her friends and mother until Anatoli reveals himself to her. Kensi later finds herself having to fight against Anatoli's former bodyguards. Finally, Kensi and Deeks get married and become husband and wife with Hetty officiating the ceremony.

Early in the beginning of the eleventh season, Kensi briefly believes she may be pregnant, until she later learns it was a false alarm, but the experience causes Kensi and Deeks to finally have a real discussion about having children. Throughout the season, Kensi and Deeks happily adjust to married life and continue to hold a strong and healthy relationship as well as managing the bar, finally naming it, "The Squid and Dagger". Later, after Deeks walks into a trap and almost dies in bomb explosion, the event causes Kensi to finally admit and realize she truly wants to have children with him.

In the thirteenth-season finale, Kensi and Deeks adopt Rosa, a teenage girl seeking a new life in the United States.

In the series finale, "New Beginnings, Part Two", Kensi learns from her doctor that she is pregnant, which leaves her, Deeks and Rosa delighted with joy.

=== Dominic Vail ===
Dominic Vail
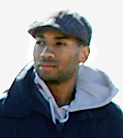
- First appearance: "Identity"
- Last appearance: "Found"
- Portrayed by: Adam Jamal Craig

In-universe information
- Nickname: Dom
- Gender: Male
- Title: Special Agent
- Occupation: Junior Field Special Agent (NCIS)
- Nationality: American

Dominic "Dom" Vail (portrayed by Adam Jamal Craig) was introduced in the episode "Identity" as the team's rookie agent. He was originally partnered with Kensi Blye. Dom is not a native of Los Angeles. An MIT alumnus, Dom moved straight to LA after he was recruited by NCIS following graduation.

Dom's field of study has not been disclosed, although he has demonstrated on several occasions advanced skills with computers and electronics, and it has been stated that he "makes a pretty good geek for a field agent". As of season one, both of Dom's parents are still alive. Dom is an uncle, as evidenced by crayon drawings stuck to his refrigerator door.

Dom disappeared in the episode "Past Lives" (although his team does not realize this until the following episode "Missing"), and was finally found in the episode "Found". It was revealed that he had been captured by professional kidnappers hired by Islamic militants and held hostage in the hope of facilitating a prisoner exchange. Although Callen, Kensi and Sam eventually found him, they later found themselves caught up in a major gunfight with the terrorists. While pinned down on the rooftop, Dom took fire that was originally intended to hit Sam with the bullets piercing his body, essentially sacrificing himself to save Sam's life. Despite Sam's efforts to stop the bleeding, Dom died almost immediately with his death leaving the OSP team completely shell-shocked and grief-stricken. The team (particularly Kensi Blye) is shown to be heartbroken and devastated the following episode.

His role in the team was later taken over by Detective Marty Deeks. The season one episode "Past Lives" was the last to credit Adam Jamal Craig as a main cast member. He was later credited as a guest star in the season one episode "Found", also his final appearance on the show.

=== Henrietta "Hetty" Lange ===
Henrietta Lange
- Linda Hunt as Henrietta "Hetty" Lange in a promotional photo for NCIS: Los Angeles season one.
- First appearance: "Identity"
- Last appearance: “Subject 17”
- Portrayed by: Linda Hunt

In-universe information
- Aliases: Sylvia Cole; Sylvia Martin; Gloria Edwards
- Nicknames: Hetty, "Duchess of deception"
- Gender: Female
- Title(s): Operations Manager, Office of Special Projects, NCIS
- Occupation: Operations manager (NCIS)
- Nationality: American

Henrietta "Hetty" Lange (portrayed by Linda Hunt) is the Operations Manager at NCIS in Los Angeles. She was introduced in "Identity", the first episode of NCIS: Los Angeles as a stand-alone series.

In spite of her small stature, the other characters find her intimidating, not least of all because of her colorful past; she has had many encounters, liaisons, and relationships with past agents (referenced in "Missing") and such Hollywood greats as George Hamilton and Frank Sinatra. She is a fan of Lady Gaga, stating that she "will always love the Gaga". Hetty's favorite beverage is tea, to such an extent that in "Bounty" she approved a mission to Afghanistan after Callen and Sam promised to bring her back a bag of tea leaves. She was assigned to the Los Angeles office prior to December 2008.

According to Hetty's NCIS personnel file, which is accessed by Nell and appears on-screen in the Season 2 finale, "Familia", Hetty:

- currently holds the position of OSP Operations Manager;
- attended the Defense Language Institute and is fluent in Russian, German, Mandarin, Spanish, Czech, Romanian, Hebrew, Arabic, Hungarian, and Pashto;
- earned a Master of Fine Arts degree from the Sorbonne;
- is a graduate of the École de la chambre syndicale de la couture parisienne;
- is skilled in Hapkido, Wushu, and Eskrima;
- won a Bronze Medal competing in the Small-Bore Rifle event at the 1964 Summer Olympics, held in Tokyo, Japan (in real life, this event was not held at the 1964 Olympics);
- is a recipient of the Defense Intelligence Agency Award of Merit and a CIA Intelligence Star;
- is a member of the Order of Orange-Nassau;
- had a prior career in motion picture and stage costuming;
- is a published novelist;
- is a pilot;
- holds the Women's Senior Division record for the ascent of K2; and
- was born on February 29, 1948.

One of the last surviving Cold Warriors, Hetty has access to contacts throughout the intelligence and defense communities, which she does not hesitate to exploit when required for a mission or to protect the lives of her agents. Her reputation has taken on a legendary aspect; the mere mention of her name is often enough to strike fear into those who have heard of, but never met, her. She has an extensive list of aliases, as evidenced by multiple driver's licenses seen in a locked drawer of her desk and several passports hidden in a private safe deposit box.

She also subscribes to an older unwritten code of conduct, evidenced by her disgust at the new generation of Russian agents who have "broken all the rules" by killing innocents (Season 2 episode "Deliverance").

Hetty sometimes exhibits a maternal instinct towards her agents. When her agents were in serious danger in the episodes "Ambush" and "Found", she used her considerable political capital and aforementioned contacts to pull out all the stops in rescuing them (such as convincing SecAF to authorize a F-22 Raptor fly-over of the militia camp).

Like Eric Beale, she is fond of Abby Sciuto; and, when the latter visited the OSP Operations Center, Hetty points out to the other agents Abby's ability to "be functional and stylish at the same time". When Deeks was shot and there was no one to call, Hetty told him to put her down as his next of kin for the future.

Hetty is deeply affected by the line-of-duty death of an agent and has twice resigned (albeit unsuccessfully) from NCIS. The first was in 1999, when a promising young NCIS Agent (Sullivan) she had personally recruited was killed when attempting to infiltrate a militia group. The second time was following the death of Agent Dominic Vail in the Season 1 episode "Found". Although she delivers her letter of resignation to Director Vance personally, it is later returned to her by Callen, who had picked the director's pocket to recover the letter. Hetty does eventually resign in the penultimate episode of Season 2 and is replaced by Senior Agent Lauren Hunter as the new Operations Manager.

In the Season 2 finale, Hetty identifies herself as a member of the Comescu family and shows that she possesses the same tattoo as the mysterious man who gave a toy soldier to Callen as a child. In the season three opening episode "Lange, H", it was revealed that Hetty is not a member of the Comescu family but, in fact, had spent decades trying to infiltrate their ranks to protect Callen. At the end of the episode, it was shown that she had been shot and had then fallen to the ground, ending the episode in a cliffhanger. In "Backstopped", having survived the shooting and taken time off to recover, Hetty officially returned to work. She also revealed to Callen that she knew his mother when she was a CIA officer and Hetty was her handler. During an operation in Romania, Clara Callen disappeared and reappeared six years later with two children; at that time, she contacted Hetty, stating that she had to get out of Romania. Although the CIA told Hetty not to bother, she decided to assist Clara Callen anyway, but Clara was killed by the Comescus before Hetty arrived. G. Callen and his sister somehow arrived in the U.S. and Hetty found them, arranging for G. Callen to get out of foster care; however, she was too late for Amy, who was already dead.

In the season three finale, Hetty resigns from the Operations Manager positions after Callen is arrested and Lauren Hunter and Mike Renko are both murdered. However, it is later revealed that the crime for which Callen was arrested had been staged, and Hetty eventually returns to her original position as Operations Manager.

Hetty is also shown to be aware of the growing romantic relationship between Kensi and Deeks since towards the end of the third season when they went undercover as a married couple. Since realizing their true feelings for each other, both Hetty and Granger begin heavily discussing their relationship in season five, questioning whether it was right for Kensi and Deeks to continue their partnership with their mutual feelings growing stronger and their relationship evolving romantically. Hetty expresses concerns for their relationship at times, but she is shown to happily approve of Kensi and Deeks being together and shows supports of the relationship developing between them and sometimes even helps to bring them further together.

In season nine, sometime following the events of the Season 8 finale, Hetty has mysteriously disappeared, apparently having retired from NCIS for good and sold most of her properties and taken her boat. Following Hetty's departure, Executive Assistant Director Shay Mosley appears to take her place and to oversee the team. Throughout the season, Callen and the team are greatly concerned regarding Hetty's disappearance and begin to try and locate her. Eventually, it is revealed Hetty has traveled to Vietnam to rescue Keane, a former teammate after the Vietnam War who Hetty thought was dead and later finds herself captured. Eventually, the team manages to find and locate Hetty along with her former associates and successfully rescue her and Keane, returning them to Los Angeles. Hetty resumes her duties as Operations Manager, but finds difficulty working together with Shay Mosley who intends to break up the team. In the season nine finale, Hetty strongly disapproves of the unsanctioned mission to Mexico, seeing that not only is it highly dangerous and that it could endanger the lives of everyone on the team, but also Hetty recognizes that Mosley is going completely out of control and is willing to sacrifice everyone's lives to get her son back. Hetty attempts to stop the mission, but is forced to give in when Mosley blackmails her, threatening to expose the team's less than legal actions.

In the season ten premiere, following the events of the team's off-the-books mission in Mexico from the previous season finale, Hetty calls retired Navy Admiral, Hollace Kilbride to help assist in rescuing them and later disappears again, leaving everyone wondering where she is. However, Hetty secretly contacts Callen, informing him she will be gone for some time, but eventually after being absent for almost the entire season, Hetty finally returns on the day of Kensi and Deeks' wedding and officiates their ceremony (Hunt took time off from the show while recovering from a car accident.)

In the thirteenth-season premiere, Hetty left OSP to embark on a long-term assignment in Syria and following her departure, retired Navy Admiral Hollace Kilbride has replaced her as the Operations Manager.

Hetty made an appearance in Scorpion in late October 2014.

=== Sam Hanna ===
Sam Hanna
- NCIS: Los Angeles and NCIS: New York character
- LL Cool J as Sam Hanna in a promotional photo for NCIS: Los Angeles.
- First appearance: "Legend (Part I)" (NCIS episode)
- Portrayed by: LL Cool J
- Other appearances: Hawaii Five-0; NCIS; NCIS: Hawaiʻi; NCIS: New York

In-universe information
- Full name: Osama Hanna
- Nickname: Sam
- Gender: Male
- Occupation: Senior Field Special Agent, NCIS; Senior Chief Petty Officer, U.S. Navy SEALs (formerly)
- Family: Col. Raymond Hanna, USMC (father); Unnamed (mother)
- Spouse: Michelle Hanna (deceased)
- Children: Aiden Hanna (son); Kamran Hanna (daughter)
- Nationality: American

Sam Hanna (portrayed by LL Cool J) is a Senior NCIS Field Agent assigned to the Office of Special Projects.

The son of a Marine Major, Osama "Sam" Hanna attended a military school and excelled in football, playing wide receiver. Like the actor, Hanna is a native of New York City.

Outside his job, Hanna has a varied range of interests, including boxing, origami, acting, vinyl records, and antique cars. He also tends to follow the latest health food and fitness fads. He suffers from coulrophobia (fear of clowns) and has a fear of maggots.

Prior to joining NCIS, Hanna served in the U.S. Navy, from which he retired with the rank of Senior Chief Petty Officer (E-8), although this contradicts his service record as shown in the episode "Betrayal" which states that he left as a Chief Petty officer (E-7). When in uniform in the 20th episode of season 4, he is seen wearing the rank of a Senior Chief. He was a member of the Special Warfare Development Group (DEVGRU) (formerly "Team Six") based in Dam Neck in Virginia. Despite his inability to swim when he first enlisted, he went on to have a distinguished career as a SEAL and various characters have referenced his "legendary" status within the SEAL community. Much of his career is vague due to the highly classified nature of most of his missions, although it has been mentioned that he served in Bosnia, (Yugoslav Wars), Chad (Pan Sahel Initiative), Iraq and Afghanistan and was stationed at the Naval Special Warfare Center in Coronado at some point. His area of expertise is the Middle East and he reads and speaks Arabic fluently and has an encyclopedic knowledge of the Qur'an. He is also multilingual, having a working knowledge of Japanese, Persian, Danish, Hebrew, Korean, and Spanish. Due to his background in the SEALs, he is able to withstand torture due to SERE training required for all special forces operators and detach himself emotionally during investigations. Although usually reticent about his service, Sam has hinted several times about how his experiences overseas have affected him: he mentions about getting help in "Field of Fire" when interviewing a homeless veteran who was distrustful of him and admits to Nate Getz in the episode "Impact" of his worries that he would one day lose himself.

Hanna has a strong sense of duty and becomes particularly indignant when the criminal is from a military background. In the episode "Vengeance" he was forced to interrogate a group of SEALs about their involvement in the death of a Navy officer suspected of leaking classified information and was visibly affected, leading Hetty to observe that she felt like she was "making him interrogate his family". In the final episode of season 11, "Code of Conduct", when investigating claims that a SEAL chief petty officer has murdered an unarmed prisoner, it is revealed that Sam is widely known and respected long even after his service ended, with multiple SEALs willing to defy their chief's orders after he reveals his presence.

In the two-part crossover episode with Hawaii Five-0 it is revealed that he is friends with head of the Five-0 Task Force and former SEAL Lieutenant Commander Steve McGarrett, although the story of how they met was never addressed.

In the season two finale, Hanna resigns from NCIS along with Callen and Kensi in order to follow Hetty's trail to Prague without Director Vance's authorization. It is revealed in the episode "Greed" that Hanna has been working undercover on a joint CIA task force in Sudan for the past year. His teammates had already been suspicious due to Hanna uncharacteristically turning up late for work and taking leaves of absence. During the investigation he crosses paths with fellow undercover operative Michelle, and Hanna said that he "pulled some strings" to get them into the USA. In this episode, Hanna is once again hunted by the Taliban. Later, it was revealed that Amir was working for a terrorist named Habib. His mission is to kill Sam, "the one that got away". Sam was trapped inside their boat shed and beaten up by Habib's men with Callen, Kensi and Deeks launching a rescue operation which was successful, resulting in the deaths of the terrorists. Throughout the episode, Callen and Hetty are worried because Hanna is personally involved in the case. Hetty "punishes" Sam for using federal resources, once again, by buying expensive Scotch at his expense.

Michelle is reactivated after NCIS, FBI and CIA discover that Sidorov has stolen three Cold War-era nuclear devices from former KGB sleeper agents in the United States. She confides to Sam that she misses her undercover work when he expresses his disapproval about her desire to return to active duty. In the season four finale, Sam is partnered with Deeks who confronts him over his indifference towards him. Hanna admits to Deeks that he has some personal flaws. Later, Deeks saves Hanna's life and ends up captured and tortured by Sidorov. In the season five premiere 'Ascension', after being found by Kensi and Granger, Deeks tells Hanna he didn't give up Michelle even under torture. Hanna visits him, stating he now owes him for the rest of his life for what Deeks did for him and Michelle. When Deeks admits he was thinking about quitting, Hanna said it would be a mistake, saying that Deeks is a great cop. In the following episode "Impact", Hanna is sent for mandatory counseling with Nate Getz by Hetty. Hanna explains that he is able to detach himself when tortured and then bring himself back to reality once it is over but is worried that there will come a day when he is unable to go back to reality.

In the episode before the season 8 finale Michelle is murdered, leaving him devastated. The team had tracked her down after her abduction but found her too late. Season 9 sees Hanna coping with his grief while struggling to remain professional. LL Cool J commented on Hanna's state of mind: "He has a single minded focus and he wants to get to the people that did this and deal with them."

In season 9, Sam sells his home with his kids away at Boarding school, puts his belongings into storage and buys a boat, which he renames Michelle, in honor of his wife. He still struggles with his grief when his anniversary came around and ended up hungover the next day. Callen helps him through his grief and by Season 10, when he suspects Sam has an interest in fellow NCIS Agent Nicole DeChamps (Marsha Thomason), he tells him Michelle would want him to be happy and move on with his life. Eventually, in Season 11, Sam starts to date Katherine Casillas (Moon Bloodgood), a feisty insurance broker who helps NCIS out with cases involving finances and high-class cases.

In 2023, Hanna gives assistance to Jane Tennant (Vanessa Lachey) and Kate Whistler (Tori Anderson) in Venezuela ("Dies Irae"). He continued to help in Hawaii until 2024.

In 2026, Hanna returns to New York City to its NCIS field office partnering with Nick Schaeffer (Scott Caan).

=== Eric Beale ===
Eric Beale
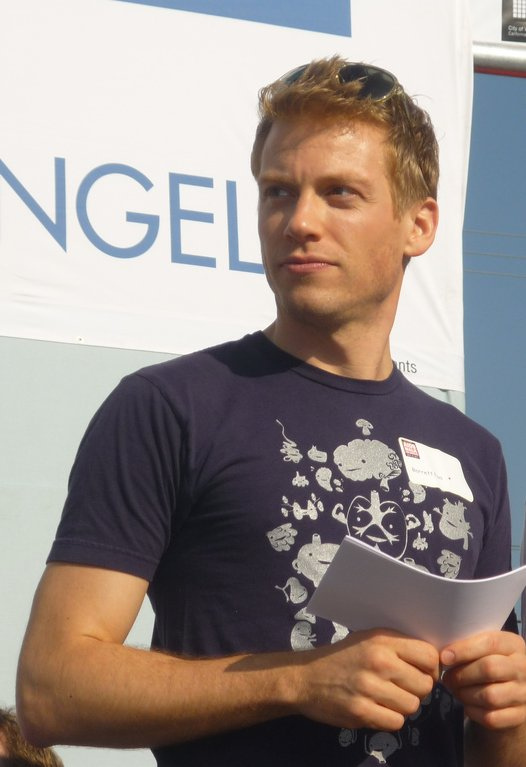
- First appearance: "Legend (Part 1)" (NCIS episode)
- Portrayed by: Barrett Foa

In-universe information
- Gender: Male
- Occupation: NCIS Tech operator (formerly)
- Significant other: Nell Jones (girlfriend)
- Nationality: American

Eric Bartholomew Beale III (portrayed by Barrett Foa) is an NCIS technical operator and intelligence analyst stationed in Los Angeles with the Office of Special Projects. He often takes calls from Director Leon Vance (Rocky Carroll) at NCIS Headquarters in Washington, D.C.

He is a geek and, like Detective Marty Deeks (Eric Christian Olsen), enjoys surfing (twice standing his surfboard too closely to Hetty's car) and internet social networks. He, like Nate, often fails at attempts at humor. Hetty also disapproves of his attire (typically Bermuda shorts and flip-flops and, on occasion, pajamas) but tolerates it because of his skills. In the episode "Absolution", he is revealed to be German American and takes at least partial offense at the team's remarks about Germans in the episode. Other than Hetty, he is the only team member shown to wear corrective eyewear.

He is the main connection between agents in the field and OSP headquarters, often manipulating traffic cameras and going into networks and satellites to gain an advantage for the agents. And, in the season two episode "Empty Quiver", he managed to shut down the entire Internet for a few minutes. Although not as often as he likes to be, he is also seen being in the field carrying a service weapon. He has worked with Abby Sciuto, a main character from the original NCIS, and has grown quite fond of her with the two having a strong friendship. The two even went on a "date" together during "Random on Purpose", but it ended abruptly when Abby was kidnapped by a serial killer named The Phantom.

In the same episode, Eric, like Abby, is shown to be skilled in sign language, beginning to learn it when he was seven years old. Near the episode's end, Eric signs to Abby that his best friend growing up was deaf. Like G. Callen, Sam Hanna, Kensi Blye and Nate Getz, he was introduced in the back-door pilot "Legend". In the opening episode of season seven, "Active Measures", Eric asks Sam to show him how to fire a weapon and how to fight, leaving open the possibility that he may want to try his hand as a field agent in the future. In season 8, Eric shows his ability as an excellent marksman during an undercover work with Nell.

He is partnered with Nell Jones in season two, whom he originally disliked because of her taking over some of his technical duties and, at least once, whistling the other team members to attention, something he usually does. He seemingly has put that behind him and warmed up to her and clearly has feelings towards her, although it's assumed that Nell doesn't exactly share Eric's feelings. This, however, may be changing, as Nell is accused by Nate Getz of having feelings for Eric in the episode "Patriot Acts" and her reaction in the season three episode "Cyber Threat" when she is clearly jealous of Eric's new partner. They shared a kiss under the mistletoe during the season four Christmas episode "Free Ride" as well as Eric going home with Nell to spend Christmas with her family (with Nell throwing out Boyfriend as a possible cover for why he is joining her). In season 8, their relationship progresses, after telling the (heavily implied true) story of when he realized he was in love with her (they were undercover as a couple at a retreat for tech-oriented couples), they share a kiss after Eric shoots a suspect's car in "Getaway".

In season 9, it's revealed Eric and Nell have started a relationship and they begin living together in season 10.

In season 12, it's revealed Eric has resigned from NCIS to further work on technology he was developing the previous season and has now become a billionaire and by the end of the season, relocates to Tokyo and asks Nell to join him, which she accepts.

=== Marty Deeks ===
Martin Atticus Deeks
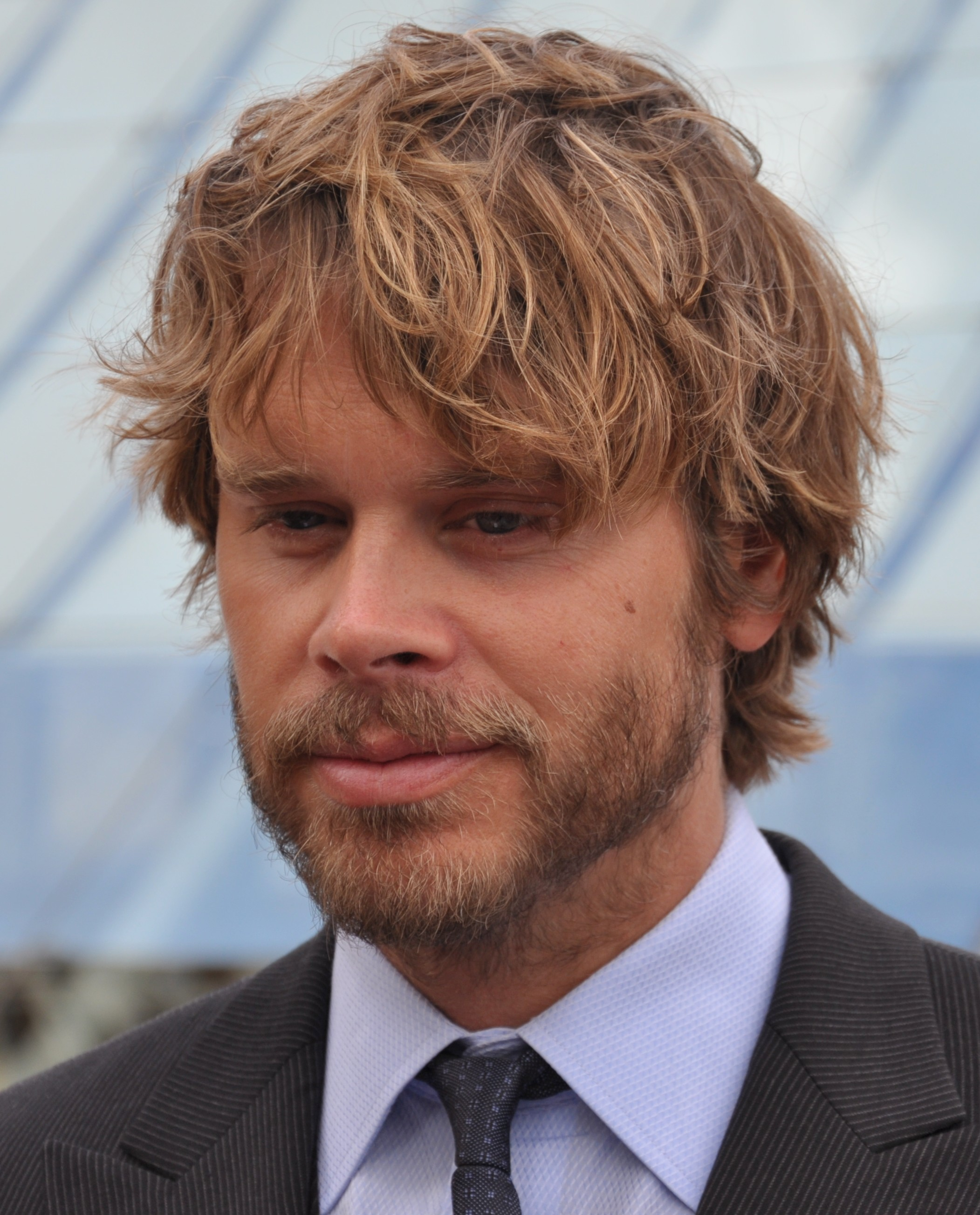
- First appearance: "Hand-to-Hand"
- Last appearance: "New Beginnings, Part Two"
- Portrayed by: Eric Christian Olsen

In-universe information
- Alias: Max Gentry
- Nicknames: Marty, Party Marty
- Gender: Male
- Title(s): NCIS Special Agent; LAPD-NCIS Liaison Officer (formerly); Lawyer (formerly)
- Occupation: NCIS Special Agent; LAPD-NCIS Liaison Officer (formerly); Lawyer (formerly)
- Family: Gordon John Brandel (father; deceased); Roberta Deeks (mother); Donald Blye (father-in-law; deceased); Julia Feldman (mother-in-law); Rosa (adoptive daughter)
- Significant other: Kensi Blye (wife)
- Nationality: American

Martin Atticus "Marty" Deeks (Eric Christian Olsen) is a member of the Los Angeles Police Department who went to law school and passed the California Bar Examination and was previously a Public Defender. He accepts the position of NCIS/LAPD Liaison Officer at the end of the episode "Hand-to-Hand", in which he co-operated with the team when their investigation overlapped with his undercover operation. However, his position as Liaison Officer is not always effective given his less-than-warm relationship with other LAPD Officers, being brushed off on multiple occasions and stating, in the episode Fame, "You know how it is with undercover cops. I've pissed off more than my fair share of shields".

At the end of his second appearance, "Fame", he tells Kensi that he will be going on a long-term undercover assignment and Kensi seemed disappointed by this. In the same episode, it is revealed through conversations between Hetty and Callen that they do not actually need a liaison officer, but that Hetty has been watching Deeks for some time and her true intention is to recruit him for NCIS. This is eventually revealed to him in the season two episode "Imposters" when Hetty presents him with a set of completed and approved NCIS application forms, which he declines. In the same episode, it is revealed that Marty's given name is Martin A. Brandel and that he was born January 8, 1979. Deeks is a native of California.

He becomes a series regular in season two, during which he reveals that he has never lived more than two miles away from where he grew up. He is revealed to be a lawyer in the season premiere. He is partnered with Kensi Blye and frequently flirts with her, although he is not above attempting to use her as a wingman to meet other women. Deeks has a vintage comic book collection.

When Deeks is shot in "Personal", he is asked to provide a list of possible suspects. He includes a man named Gordon John Brandel; and it is later revealed that Brandel is his father, who frequently abused Deeks and his mother until Deeks shot him (non-fatally) when he was 11 years old. When Hetty asks her to find Brandel, Nell discovers that he died in an auto accident in 1998 after being released from prison. This, however, contradicts statements made in the earlier episode "Borderline", in which Deeks told Kensi that, at Thanksgiving dinner only six years earlier, his father fired a shotgun at him. He also said that the last thing his father said to him was, "Marty, I hate you". The contradiction brings into question whether Deeks' father is really dead. When Deeks asks Hetty who he should list as his next of kin, Hetty gives him her name.

Deeks is extremely personal about his choice of firearm, preferring the LAPD Beretta 92FS over the NCIS standard-issue SIG Sauer P229. As stated in the episode "Bounty", this is because the 92FS's "manual safety saved [his] ass one time during a gun snatch attempt by a junkie". In this episode, Deeks revealed that his father moved to Iowa. He also managed to make a connection with a child whose father was killed.

In the episode "Plan B", Deeks' best friend, Ray, tells him that he knows Deeks has "a thing" for Kensi; he knows this by observing numerous interactions between them. Though Deeks denies that he has "a thing" for Kensi, he blushes and cannot stop smiling while telling Ray that he does not have a thing. This leads some people to believe that Deeks may have feelings for Kensi. Ray tells Deeks to call him as soon "as things work out with Wikipedia" (Kensi). Near the end of the episode, Kensi asks Deeks if he is ever going to call Ray anytime soon. He walks close to her, then pulls back to look at her, then he smiles and says, "Why do you ask?" She said she was just wondering and that, when he does tell Ray that "things are working out", mention that Kensi says "Hi", he laughs; and then Kensi says that she is glad that their "thing" is working out. Deeks once again denies any feelings he has for Kensi. In the next episode "Imposters", a waitress asks Deeks if he and Kensi are a couple, Deeks says they are but Kensi is surprised and denies that they are together.

In the season two finale, Deeks proves his loyalty to the team. When Callen, Sam, and Kensi resign to rescue Hetty in Prague, Deeks tells Director Vance that he would resign if he was an NCIS agent, before leaving with the team to find Hetty.

In the episode "The Recruit", Deeks said that he has Norwegian ancestry.

In the season three episode "Touch of Death", a crossover episode with Hawaii Five-0, Deeks, like the rest of the OSP team, meets Detective Sergeant Danny Williams (Scott Caan) and Detective Lieutenant Chin Ho Kelly (Daniel Dae Kim) as the two teams form a temporary partnership to stop a possible smallpox outbreak. During the episode, Deeks and Danny regularly butt heads, exchanging insults while Deeks jokingly regards Danny's hair as being bulletproof. This episode also reveals that Deeks is afraid of needles; and, when Hetty gives him a smallpox vaccination, Deeks can be heard screaming in agony before fainting, causing an amused Sam to remark, "Man down".

In "Neighborhood Watch", Kensi and Deeks go undercover as a married couple. Hetty has a talk with both of them about feelings that arise when two agents go undercover as a couple. The two laugh at the idea of having any kind of romantic feelings for each other, but their reactions are different. They play up the role, as their usual bickering goes very well with their current assignment together. They refer to each other as husband and wife, while in private they use their undercover names. This is unusual because throughout the episode they are shown talking to OPS inside their cover house. Deeks and Kensi have an awkward, yet enjoyable, confrontation with each other inside the cover house. Deeks walks in on Kensi in the bathroom, he in a velour jogging suit and Kensi in a towel. After a brief conversation about her making him worry about her, they stand awkwardly. Kensi tells Deeks to take off his fanny pack (he calls it his "bro-sack") because it looks ridiculous. Deeks, not understanding what Kensi was referring to, starts to take off his pants. Kensi screams, and Deeks enjoys the situation. Also, when Kensi talks about starting a family, he says that he could do that for her since he was her "husband". It is uncertain if he was talking about this through his cover or if he was actually talking to Kensi. The assignment becomes more personal when Kensi and Deeks talk about how they first met and even recall what each other was wearing on the day and later share their first kiss.

Despite their denial, it becomes quite clear that Deeks and Kensi are beginning to develop strong romantic feelings for each other for which they try to hide and ignore. However, after many tender and caring moments in season four, Deeks finally makes his feelings known in the season finale. Kensi accuses him of poor communication skills and "never saying what he means"; but Deeks cuts off her complaint with a kiss and then says, "How's that for communication?" The kiss leaves Kensi dumbfounded, and she drives away. Deeks is eventually paired with Sam and the two are eventually captured with the episode ending with Deeks being tortured as Sam helplessly looks on.

In the season five premiere, Kensi and Granger found Sam and Deeks, who were severely beaten and tortured. Deeks revealed that even under severe torture, he did not give up Michelle's identity, earning Sam's respect. Together with Kensi and Sam, Deeks helped take down Sidorov. At the end of the episode, Deeks tells Kensi that she was the person he thought of through the ordeal and it saved his life by keeping him going, leaving her deeply emotional. In the next episode, Deeks struggles with insomnia and the trauma he dealt with, but he has been avoiding Kensi's phone calls. However, at the end of the episode, Kensi visits Deeks and he manages to get to sleep with her help.

In the episode "Recovery", it's implied that Deeks and Kensi had become intimate after he told her he wanted to be with her at his apartment and she walked off with him following her. However, in the following episode "Frozen Lake", things have become full of tension when their emotions begin to impact their jobs. When Deeks doesn't take a needed shot, Kensi becomes mad at him for not taking it and he apologizes, only that while Kensi wants this relationship more than anything else, she thinks their relationship may not work. However, at the end of the episode, Kensi tells Deeks that they will find a way to make things work and to be patient with her. Deeks soon discovers that Kensi has been reassigned on a new classified mission, much to his disappointment. Hetty pointed out that the knife that Kensi entrusted to him during the case was her father's, meaning she has a great deal of trust in him. In 'Merry Invasion', Hetty gives both Kensi and Deeks secure satellite phones, under the guise of Christmas gifts, giving them a means to communicate while Kensi is on her mission.

In season six, Deeks and Kensi agree to make their relationship official and finally become a couple. They attempt to keep their romance secret until the rest of the team reveal their awareness of their relationship in "Fighting Shadows" when Deeks and Kensi are forced to partner with Callen and Sam respectively. In the same episode, Deeks and Kensi learn Deeks is under investigation by the LAPD for reasons unknown. In season seven, Deeks and Kensi's relationship remains strong to the point Deeks introduces Kensi to his mother, but they are still worried about the LAPD internal Affairs Investigation. When Deeks is later arrested, the team learn Deeks supposedly murdered his former partner, Francis Boyle back when he was a rookie detective and work to clear his name. When the investigation is concluded, Deeks secretly confides to Hetty he did kill Boyle to protect his old LAPD informant, Tiffany Williams and is deciding whether or not he should tell Kensi. In the following episode, Deeks tells Kensi the truth to which she reveals she already discovered on her own and was waiting for him to tell her when he was ready. Deeks and Kensi's relationship grows significantly stronger and they decide to move in together. By the end of the season, Deeks indirectly proposes to Kensi for the first time.

In season eight, Deeks plans on proposing to Kensi, but their relationship faces challenges and difficulties when Kensi is severely injured in a helicopter crash, resulting in her falling into a coma and becoming practically paralysed. Deeks continues to show his love and support for Kensi during this difficult time, even when Kensi begins taking her anger and frustration out on him. Eventually, Deeks proposes to Kensi, but she is refuses to accept in her current state and wishes for him to wait until she has healed from her injuries. Eventually, Kensi fully recovers and resumes her place on the team and her partnership with Deeks. By the end of the season, Kensi and Deeks finally become officially engaged when Kensi proposes to Deeks, following the death of Sam's wife, Michelle Hanna.

In season nine, Kensi and Deeks begin planning their wedding, but face trouble when Shay Mosley, the new executive assistant director tries to send Deeks back to LAPD as she disapproves of their relationship together. However, Callen manages to convince her to keep Deeks on the team. Throughout the season, Kensi and Deeks continue planning their wedding as well as thinking about their future together, with Deeks expressing his hopes of someday leaving NCIS and starting a family with Kensi, especially after she almost risked her life to stop a nuclear threat. In the season finale, Deeks is fired by Mosley after confronting her about her unfair and disrespectful behaviour towards Callen and the rest of the team. During this time, Deeks and Kensi discuss leaving NCIS again, but Deeks shockingly discovers that Kensi never wants to leave or start a family with him, resulting in a massive fight between them and calling off the wedding. Despite Deeks and Kensi's falling out and the current uncertainty of their relationship, Deeks still joins the rest of the team on a dangerous mission to rescue Mosley's son. In the end while the mission is successful, the team are hit by a rocket launcher, leaving it unclear if they are dead or alive.

In the season ten premiere, following the events of the season nine finale, Deeks is unconscious and is suffering from a severe head injury. The team are forced to separate and Kensi drags Deeks through the desert to safety, eventually reaching a church. During his time unconscious, Deeks dreams that Kensi is pregnant with their child. Deeks later awakens and eventually after reaching the hospital, Deeks and Kensi reconcile after this whole event has helped them to realize just how much they truly love one another and they simply can't live without each other. With their relationship restored, Deeks and Kensi resume their engagement and continue making more progress in planning their upcoming wedding and at the same time open their bar. Eventually, the day of Deeks and Kensi's wedding arrives. After getting over last minute pre wedding jitters, Deeks locates the Box Kensi gave to him years ago and finally opens it, discovering it contains her father's wedding ring and a deeply heartfelt letter from Kensi, expressing her love for him. Deeks and Kensi finally marry and become husband and wife with Hetty officiating their ceremony.

In season eleven, Deeks and Kensi are happily married and begin to think more about having children together after Kensi has a false alarm, believing she might be pregnant. Eventually, they decide they are ready to have a baby together.

In season twelve, Deeks and Kensi are ready to start a family together when they begin to strongly consider fertility treatments to get pregnant. However, they begin struggling financially when Deeks’ position as the LAPD liaison is terminated due to police reform. Deeks begins to face serious pressure when he discovers his job has been terminated permanently and that he has been furloughed by the LAPD until their budget issues surrounding the reform are resolved, and learns that he cannot attend FLETC due to being too old at this point, forcing him to leave NCIS for good. In order to help with their finances, Deeks decides to sell the bar. However, thanks to Hetty's efforts, Deeks learns that he has been accepted into FLETC, allowing him to become an official NCIS Special Agent and rejoin the team. Although he has difficulty with the training and supposedly washes out just before graduation, it's revealed that Hetty had arranged for Deeks to get his badge by her, officially making him an NCIS Special Agent at long last. However, his credential indicates he is an NCIS Investigator, and not a Special Agent.

=== Nell Jones ===
Penelope "Nell" Jones
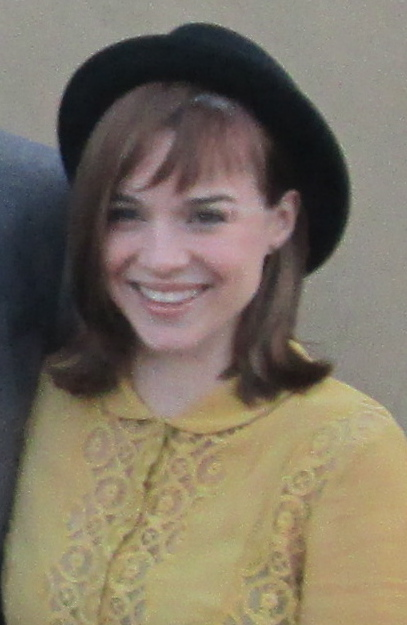
- Nell Jones promotional photo
- First appearance: "Special Delivery"
- Last appearance: "New Beginnings, Part Two"
- Portrayed by: Renée Felice Smith

In-universe information
- Nickname: Nellasuoarus
- Gender: Female
- Title: NCIS intelligence analyst
- Occupation: Intelligence analyst
- Family: Sidney Jones (sister); Unnamed brother
- Significant other: Eric Beale (boyfriend)
- Nationality: American

Penelope "Nell" Jones (portrayed by Renée Felice Smith) is Eric's partner as an NCIS analyst. Introduced as a recurring character in the season two episode "Special Delivery", Nell joined the main cast as of episode 2.11 "Disorder". She has a red pixie cut hairstyle (which she grows out as the series progresses) and is of small-medium stature (being able to wear a Hetty-sized sweater—just barely—in the episode "Disorder"). In the episode "Harm's Way" she demonstrates at least a functional knowledge of written Arabic when she is called upon to translate the contents of a terrorist laptop. In the episode "The Fifth Man" Hetty states that Nell has the highest I.Q. of anyone currently serving in NCIS but the actual number is never stated. In the episode "Cyber Attack", Sam asks Callen if Hetty is grooming her for higher things after seeing Nell running things around the office. In the episode "Merry Evasion" Callen asks the same question of Hetty directly when Hetty states that she intends to keep Nell in the field a bit longer.

Although Nell is a recent college graduate she is frequently shown as very helpful to the others. She and Eric originally had an antagonistic relationship early on due to Nell taking over some of Eric's duties, being new and once getting the others upstairs for briefing, a task Eric normally does. As their working relationship has progressed, they seem to have warmed up to each other and it is implied there are growing feelings between the two. Nell also has a habit of finishing other people's sentences. In "Special Delivery" she reveals that this is because she is a "type A with borderline ADD, and control issues with men [she] admires" (such as Eric).

In the episode "Lockup", it is shown that Nell and Nate have met previously, but the nature of their relationship—if any—remains unknown. She also seems to have a good relationship with Hetty, and has been called by her first name or as "Dear" by Hetty occasionally. She seems to be friends or at least on good terms with Kensi who invites her to join the others for drinks in the episode "Absolution". Nell is fluent in Spanish and an expert of South America (Enemy Within). She likes to receive flowers; in the episode "Greed", she sends flowers to herself and reveals to Eric only after his never-ending pestering. The flowers are noticed at first by Sam who comments, "Looks like somebody has a secret admirer." When Eric notices it, he stops mid-sentence and says, "Nice flowers".

Eric more than obviously has feelings towards Nell, although it often appears that she doesn't exactly return them. This is often up for debate though, since in the season three episode "Patriot Acts", Nell flirts with Nate (who immediately picks up on her true intentions) in order to get Eric's attention and in "Greed", she avoids the subject of who sent her flowers. One of the bigger signs is when she shows significant signs of jealousy when a new woman has some type of significant relationship with him. This is shown in the episode "Cyber Threat", when she is jealous of Eric's new partner and feels threatened by their relationship, also showing her dislike towards the young woman herself. Also, in the episode "Blaze of Glory", when a new college student named Blaze comes to help with an undercover mission and she and Eric show an interest in each other, Nell is seen clearly jealous of the two's growing relationship throughout the episode. She is also visibly disappointed when learning, after the mission, that Eric has made plans to meet up with Blaze and some of her friends in a suite later on.

In addition to going into the field, Nell has been seen carrying and is proficient with her standard NCIS issue side arm in the episodes "Blye, K.", "Blye, K Part 2", and "Unwritten Rule" as well as having one tucked into her waistband in "Standoff" and telling Eric she is carrying one in "Recruit". Nell has also been seen apprehending suspects in season five. After Kensi's reassignment to the Middle East, Hetty makes Nell her replacement as a field agent and as Deeks' partner. Despite initial surprise at the new assignment, Nell and Deeks find that they work well together and Hetty hints that she intends to keep her in the field longer. However, Nell suffered a setback with regards to her field work in "Praesidium", when she shot and killed an assailant who was working for Matthias Draeger. In the episode "War Cries" Nell defends herself in the boat shed with a knife pulled from her boot, after the suspect gets her weapon away from her, dealing enough damage to send him to the hospital while she receives only a small cut above the right eye causing Granger to quip, "Not bad for an analyst". In the episode "The Queen's Gambit" and "Black Market", Nell shows her proficiency in hand-to-hand combat in apprehending suspects and is nicknamed "Give Them Hell, Nell!" by Deeks, who gave her the nickname Nellasaurus in the episode "Merry Evasion". In "Queen's Gambit" after Nell takes a suspect down Callan tells him, "You should never ignore the Nellverine." In the episode "Ghost Gun", as she is partnered with Granger, she introduces herself as Special Agent during an investigation. However, she states to Kensi in "Windfall" and to Granger in "Black Market" that although she does want to become an Agent she does not want to do it by replacing Kensi.

Her relationship with Deeks in the field (Merry Evasion, Windfall, Queens Gambit, Black Market) is more a partnership equals as they both have skills if not always in the same areas. When in the field with Granger on the other hand (Command and Control, Ghost Gun) it is more of a student-teacher master-apprentice relationship as she takes the opportunity to learn from a seasoned master who had been doing this since before, she was born.

Eric and Nell shared a kiss under the green mistletoe during the season four Christmas episode "Free Ride", this was at the end of the episode and when no one was around. In the season six Christmas episode "Humbug" Nell invites Eric to come with her to visit her family for the holidays, suggesting when he is trying to think of a cover story that he could say he is her boyfriend. At the end of "Blaze of Glory" when Nell is alone in OPS, Eric returns from his meeting with Blaze and apologizes for the way he has been acting. They then share an intimate moment as they fly the quadcopter together around OPS. In the episode "Tidings We Bring" when Eric becomes upset that Nell has to cancel on their plans to attend the Dickens Fair together because she got into a mentoring program to which he didn't know she was applying and becomes afraid they are beginning to grow apart, she gives him as a Christmas present a pendulum clock telling him that when two such clocks hang on the same wall the pendulums begin to swing together, meaning she and Eric will always be in rhythm with each other, thus implying that if they are not already a couple they are certainly best friends who will one day become a couple.

In "This Is What We Do", Nell's sister came to help on one NCIS' case, and she called Nell by her full name "Penelope". When Eric told her he can't believe she didn't tell him her first name and that it is a nice name, Nell answered "Yeah, maybe, if you are from Victorian England".

In "Superhuman", Eric explained to Nell his landlord was selling his place and he has to find a new place to live. Eric asked if she wanted to move in with him, not because of finances, and she cut him off, answering "I would love to move in with you", and they are now officially living together.

In "Fortune Favors the Brave", Hetty found out Nell is going to quit. Nell explained to her that she feels she can't give proper focus the job needs. Hetty suggested to Nell she should go on a two-week vacation. Hetty also told her if she doesn't call her after that, she will accept her resignation. Nell accepted Hetty's suggestion. She later wanted to talk with Eric about her decision, but somebody called her on her phone so she didn't have a chance to talk to Eric. In the season 12 episode, "The Bear" it's revealed that Nell's mother had died after she returned to OSP.

=== Owen Granger ===
Owen Granger
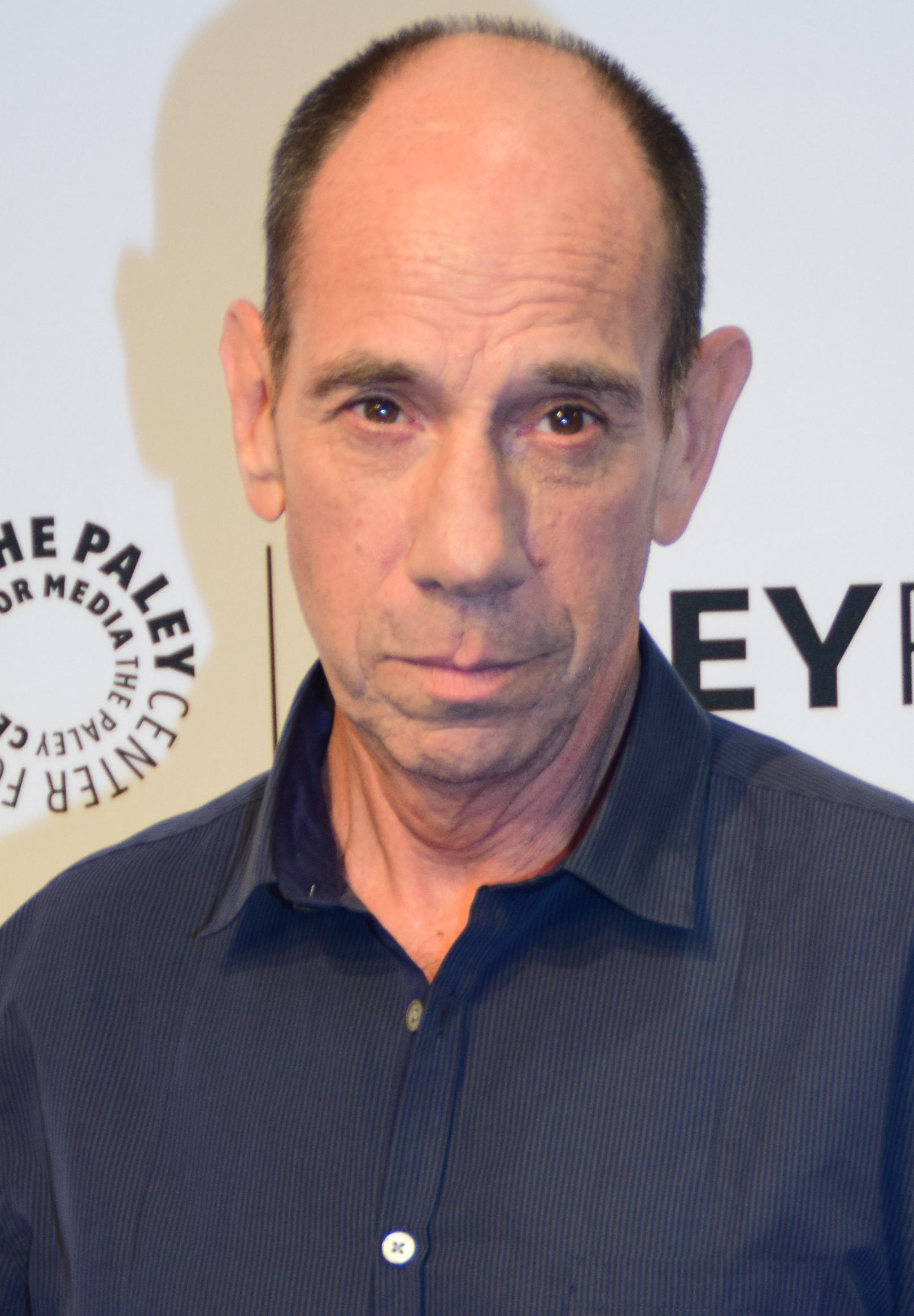
- First appearance: "The Watchers"
- Last appearance: "Payback"
- Portrayed by: Miguel Ferrer

In-universe information
- Gender: Male
- Title(s): Assistant Director, Office of Special Projects, NCIS
- Occupation: Assistant Director (NCIS)
- Children: Jennifer Kim (daughter)
- Nationality: American

Owen Granger (portrayed by Miguel Ferrer) was the assistant director of NCIS, filling the position that was held by Leon Vance before he became the new NCIS Director.

Granger first appeared in "The Watchers", in which he questioned Hetty Lange's ability to lead the OSP team. He was a recurring character in seasons three and four and a main character in seasons five through eight. Granger's original motives are unknown though it seemed like he was trying to bring down Lange's team in order to score points in Washington and enhance his own authority over NCIS. He revealed at the end of "Crimeleon" that he had arrived in Los Angeles to catch a killer and glanced at Kensi Blye, suggesting that he might be involved in the investigation of her father's death. It was revealed in the episode "Blye, K., Part 2" that Granger had also belonged to the same sniper unit as Kensi's deceased father Donald Blye, and that he had helped the team track down his killer, Peter Clairmont. Granger shot Clairmont when the other man attempted to kill Blye in revenge for her having beaten him in hand-to-hand combat. As a result, Granger was assigned to stay in Los Angeles on a temporary basis. In the season three finale, he helped the team tackle the case of "The Chameleon", a serial killer responsible for the deaths of Agent Mike Renko and former Operations Manager Lauren Hunter.

Granger was heavily involved in the effort to apprehend Isaak Sidorov and the Cold War-era nuclear weapons he stole, proving a strong support to the team when he learns that the only agent to have been able to maintain a deep cover with him was Michelle, Sam Hanna's wife. He was also appointed to head the "White Ghost" operation, during which he became Kensi's handler when she was reassigned to the Middle East to conduct an assassination.

Along with the rest of the team, Granger is also heavily aware of the growing romantic relationship between Kensi and Deeks. He is shown heavily discussing and debating their relationship in season five with Hetty. Granger is unsure if Deeks and Kensi should continue working together as partners, with their feelings growing stronger for each other. However, Granger eventually comes to support their relationship when Deeks and Kensi officially become a couple.

In "Granger, O.", it is revealed that Jennifer Kim (Malese Jow), a North Korean spy captured by the OSP in "Cancel Christmas", is his illegitimate daughter (which was heavily implied in the former episode).

In the season 8 episode "Black Market", Granger tells Nell Jones to call him Granger, not assistant director. When she tells him, "That would be awkward, sir", he answers: "Too bad, because it's an order." In "Ghost Gun", he tells Marty Deeks to call him Granger and says that it is "what his friends call him".

In the season 8 episode "Crazy Train", Granger reveals that he is dying from a form of cancer which he admits could have been caused by any of his actions, including being exposed to Agent Orange from while he was in the Triangle prior to being extracted from Laos. He later ends up stabbed in "Hot Water" while being escorted to a jail cell and is left in critical condition. In "Payback", he was nearly the target of a hit by an agent of the CIA, although he managed to kill the assassin before she could inject a poison into his IV. In that same episode, it is revealed that he once tried to kill future Rear Admiral A. J. Chegwidden when "[Chegwidden] was young and [Granger] was stupid".

Granger was written out of the series in the season 8 episode "Old Tricks". Hetty tells her colleagues that the process of his recovery will be longer than expected. When she goes to the hospital to visit him, she discovers that his bed is empty. After asking his nurse of his whereabouts, she learns that Granger quietly fled the hospital and abandoned further treatment despite not being fully recovered. Granger left a farewell note for Hetty. In Granger's written good-bye, he expresses his thanks to Hetty, explaining that he has had enough bullets and hospitals for one lifetime and has decided to put his last affairs in order, effectively parting ways with the team without subjecting them to his impending death from cancer. His one wish is for her to break the news to the team gracefully; his note states that if she cannot immediately figure out how to do this, he trusts that she will eventually come up with a way to do so. The episode ended with a tribute to Miguel Ferrer, who had died a few weeks before the episode premiered. Ferrer had exhibited noticeable hoarseness and pronounced difficulty speaking in the episodes filmed shortly before his death. His deteriorating voice and failing health were justified through his character's development of terminal cancer, which reflected Ferrer's own worsening cancer. The character's abrupt departure was posthumous, and was designed around the actor's demise.

Although Granger himself does not actually appear in "Battle Scars", he is frequently mentioned throughout the episode. Like in "Battle Scars", Granger, owing to his heavily implied death, does not physically appear in "Golden Days", but he is alluded to several times. At the end of the episode, Hetty, A.J. Chegwidden and their fellow Vietnam friends raise a glass to him in honour and memory.

In "Liabilities", Granger is confirmed to have died. After leaving the hospital in "Old Tricks", he went to the safe house his daughter resided in and spent his last week with her, trying to make up for his failure to be a father to her. One morning, Jennifer found him dead under a tree overlooking a valley and buried him there.

=== Shay Mosley ===
Shay Mosley
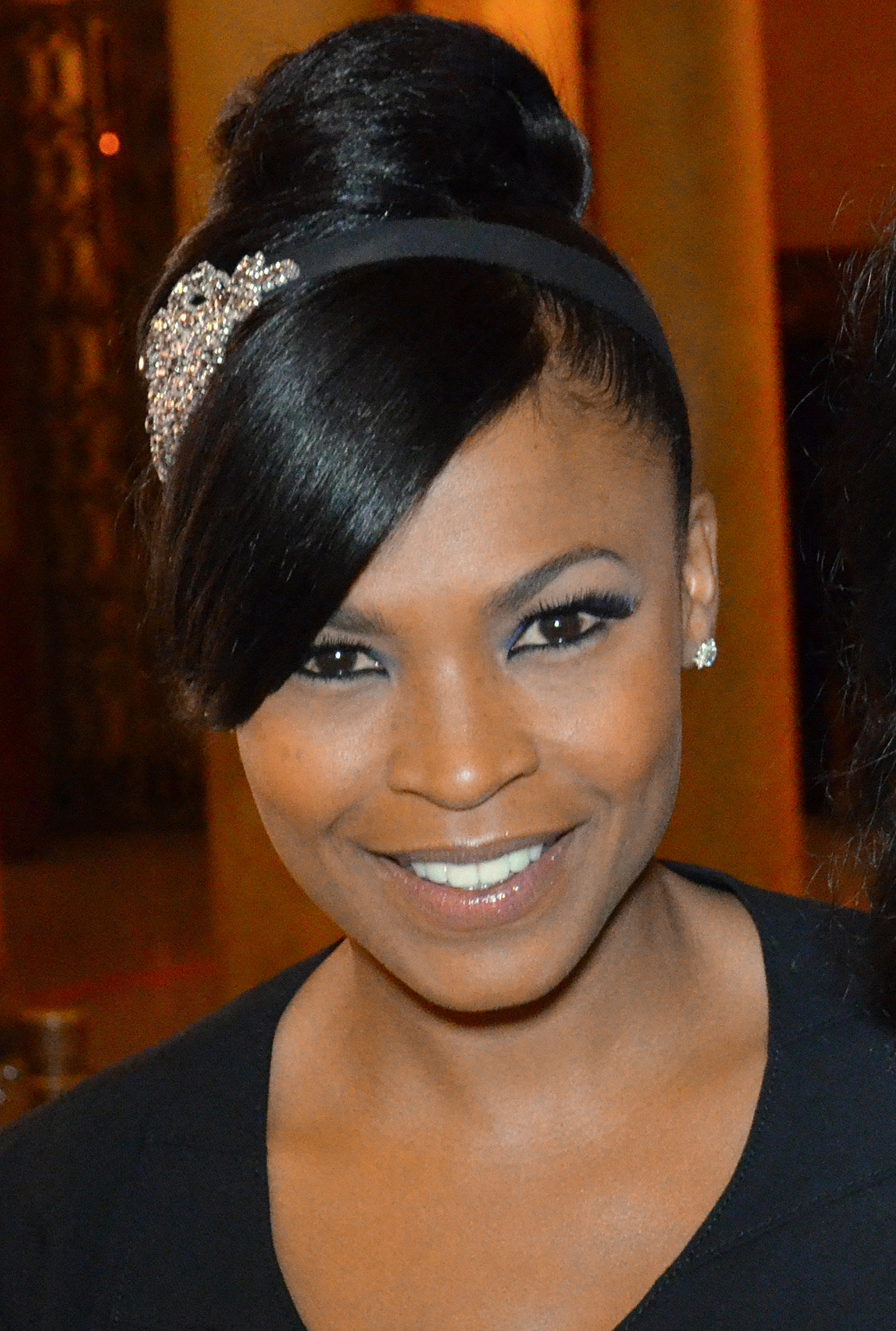
- First appearance: "Party Crashers"
- Last appearance: "Asesinos"
- Portrayed by: Nia Long

In-universe information
- Gender: Female
- Title(s): Executive Assistant Director, Pacific Operations, NCIS
- Occupation: Executive Assistant Director (NCIS)
- Family: Derrick Mosley (son)
- Nationality: American

Shay Lynn Mosley (portrayed by Nia Long) is the new NCIS Executive Assistant Director, Pacific Operations, succeeding Assistant Director Owen Granger as supervisor of the Office of Special Projects.

In "The Monster", Mosley separates Callen from the team and leads him to assist in the investigation led by ATF. Later, Hetty reveals to the team that this is in fact an undercover mission to catch an arms dealer, Spencer Williams. Later, Mosley confesses to Callen she was in a romantic relationship with Williams before she knew he was an arms dealer and they have a son, Derrick, whom Williams took to Mexico when he escaped and she had not seen him for 5 years. The team then ambushes Williams at the airport, but he manages to escape in an airplane to Mexico.

A month later, in "A Line on the Sand", Shay launches an investigation on Williams to find her son. However, during the investigation, Deeks falls into conflict with her, so she fires him and sends him back to LAPD. Before the team leaves for Mexico Hetty manages to stop the airplane and inserts Deeks with them. When they arrive in Mexico, the team finds out Mosley also sent Harley Hidoko there, but she disappears.

In "Ninguna Salida", Callen and Sam found a body burned beyond a recognition, but they do not know who it was. Later, the team succeeds in entering Williams' house and rescue Derrick. But Sam and Callen stay behind to allow Kensi and Deeks to escape with Derrick. Kensi and Deeks manage to bring Derrick to the location where Mosley is waiting for him in a chopper and the two of them leave. Deeks and Kensi go back to get Sam and Callen, but they are then hit by a missile.

During "To Live and Die in Mexico", Shay returned to Mexico and ambushes Williams and his men in a car. While speaking with Williams, Shay kills three men who were with him. After he was the only one alive, Mosley orders Williams to withdraw his people from the hospital where the team is, but he refuses so she shoots and kills him.

In "Hit list", Special Prosecutor John Rogers (Peter Jacobson) starts an investigation about the team's actions in Mexico and Mosley's involvement. Mosley sends her son Derrick with Sam's SEAL buddy in Sam's boat to a secret location. In the episode, "Asesinos", Mosley goes to take down the people who put a price on her head and later, with the help of the team, when it became obvious that she went rogue, sets them up to meet with a rival clan and kill each other. When Callen spoke with her after the action, one of the survivors attempts to kill her. Callen turns and kills him. When he looks back, Mosley has vanished.

Mosley's current whereabouts are unknown.

=== Fatima Namazi ===
Fatima Namazi (portrayed by Medalion Rahimi) is an NCIS Special Agent. She is a devout Muslim, as indicated by her decision to wear a hijab.

Namazi first appears halfway through in season 10 in the two-parter "Smokescreen", where she helps the team pursue a terrorist cell responsible for bombing a movie theater in the first of a series of planned attacks on Los Angeles. From then on, Namazi appears periodically, helping the OSP team with cases from either in the Ops Center or out in the field, until she is reassigned overseas to Afghanistan early the following season.

In "Alsiyadun", she is captured by insurgents following a mission gone wrong and nearly executed before the team rescues her. Following this, she transfers to the OSP, becoming its newest addition until the following season.

=== Devin Rountree ===
Devin Rountree (portrayed by Caleb Castille) is an NCIS Special Agent.

Rountree first appears late in season 11, in "Watch Over Me", as an FBI Agent who runs into the OSP team while undercover, during which he discovers that several colleagues have turned corrupt. Following this, he later accepts an offer from Sam to try out for an opening on the team. After working a few cases near the end of the season, he completes FLETC training and joins the OSP at the start of season 12, becoming its most recent addition.

=== Hollace Kilbride ===
Hollace Kilbride (portrayed by Gerald McRaney) is a retired United States Navy Admiral, who is a longtime friend of Henrietta "Hetty" Lange.

In Season 13, Kilbride takes over from Hetty after she goes on assignment. In one episode, he reveals some of his background to Rountree. As a child, he had Japanese American neighbors named the Sakamoto family who were detained in POW camps. Kilbride's parents were disgusted by racism and protected the Sakamoto house for two years. This left him inspired and he resolved to live up to their example, as seen when he defended a former lieutenant who was the target of a hate crime.

Kensi later revealed he has a son. Much later he reveals to Deeks that he and his son are estranged, having not spoken for a decade. He began to consider talking after Deeks reveals his status with his abusive late father.

== Recurring characters ==
=== Leon Vance ===
Leon Vance (portrayed by Rocky Carroll) is the director of NCIS and also the person responsible for setting up the Office of Special Projects. He lives in Washington, D.C., and is a regular character on NCIS while also making regular guest appearances on NCIS: Los Angeles usually through video-conferences as well as making a few personal appearances at the OSP.

=== Mike Renko ===
Mike Renko (portrayed by Brian Avers) is an NCIS agent introduced in the back-door pilot from NCIS. He first appeared in NCIS: Los Angeles as a recurring character in the episode "Ambush", in which he assisted the team with information on a dangerous militia group. He also appeared in the episode "The Bank Job". His next appearance was on the episode "Burned", when Hetty called for help as they had a shortage of agents since Callen went off the radar and the server was hacked. He was shot as he, Sam, and Kensi ambushed an alleged terrorist, but it hit his bulletproof vest and he escaped with minor injuries. It was assumed that Renko was still in an undercover assignment outside of the United States.

In the season three finale, "Sans Voir", Renko, after being shot in the upper jaw by a sniper, suffered cardiac arrest after surgery, which resulted in his death.

Kensi later called Hetty on the telephone and told her what had happened. Seconds later, Hetty, who was seen crying, managed to pull herself together and later told the OSP team what had happened, leaving them, especially Kensi, personally devastated.

=== Abby Sciuto ===
Abby Sciuto (portrayed by Pauley Perrette) is a regular from NCIS who has appeared in two episodes of NCIS: Los Angeles ("Killshot" and "Random on Purpose"). Abby is complimented by Hetty as "the first NCIS employee [she] has ever met with a sense of style".

=== Anthony "Tony" DiNozzo Jr. ===
Tony DiNozzo (portrayed by Michael Weatherly) is a regular from NCIS who has appeared in one episode of NCIS: Los Angeles ("Blame It on Rio"). Tony is the Senior Field Agent and second in command of the Major Case Response team in Washington, D.C. since before the series premier to Weatherly's departure from the show at the end of NCIS' 13th season. He is the jokester of his team and its leader in special circumstances. In "Blame it on Rio", Tony stops in LA to transport a prisoner back to D.C. only to lose said prisoner before he can even get to LA. The LA team help Tony find and recapture his prisoner before he returns to D.C., getting a "Gibbs headslap" from Hetty who says, "that was from Gibbs."

=== Rose Schwartz ===
Rose Schwartz (portrayed by Kathleen Rose Perkins) is a coroner in Los Angeles. She first appeared in season one, ep. 2 "The Only Easy Day". She has also appeared in the season one episode "Breach", the season two episode "Overwatch", and the season four episodes "Skin Deep" and "Paper Soldiers". Rose and Nate share a mutual attraction, which they've never acted upon. This has not been explored further as Peter Cambor is no longer a member of the regular cast.

=== Arkady Kolcheck ===
An old "friend" and longtime ally of G. Callen, Arkady Kolcheck (Russian: Аркадий Kolcheck) (Vyto Ruginis) is a retired KGB agent who now owns and operates a private security company out of Los Angeles. He immigrated to the United States in 2002 and became a citizen in 2007; he lives in Studio City.

Like Henrietta Lange, Arkady is one of the last surviving Cold Warriors. It is believed that his new life in America came about because "he knows where the bodies are buried...probably because he's the one who buried them".

In "Kolcheck, A.", Callen and the Office of Special Projects learn that Arkady has a Russian-American daughter, Anastasia Kolcheck (Bar Paly).

As of Season 9, Arkady is the only recurring character to appear in every season.

=== Talia Del Campo ===
DEA agent Talia Del Campo (portrayed by Mercedes Mason) first appears in Season 5 episode "Fish Out of Water", where she is introduced as an undercover investigating a case after a witness and civilian are killed. She allies with NCIS after Hetty pulls some strings, and is partnered with Marty Deeks. During the case, she develops a connection to Deeks, having empathized with him over his relationship with Kensi (who was on assignment in Afghanistan) and nicknames him partner after the end. She returns in "Deep Trouble", where she meets Kensi and a rivalry forms between them over Deeks, who is caught in the middle.

=== Nicole DeChamps ===
NCIS agent Nicole DeChamps (portrayed by Marsha Thomason) who first appears "Old Trick", where she is introduced as a Secret Service agent. She helps NCIS agent in procuring a valuable coin from a Navy Lieutenant and is partnered with Sam Hanna. She returns in an undercover assignment in Season 9, where she is shot in the shoulder but is saved by Sam. Afterwards, Sam suggests she join NCIS.

=== Moe Dusa ===
Mowahd (variant spelling Mowadh) "Moe" Dusa (portrayed by Ronald Auguste) is a Sudanese national who was brought to the US as a child by Sam Hanna (who was still serving as a Navy SEAL at the time). Sam was on a mission in Chad rescuing foreign aid workers, and killed Moe's father who was one of their kidnappers.

Although Sam maintains close contact with Moe, he has not adopted him, and Moe instead lives with foster parents.

Introduced in the episode "Breach", Moe later joins an Islamic militant group after finding out that Sam was the one responsible for his father's death, resulting in young Moe becoming an orphan. He is later seen in the episode "Found" as one of the Islamic militants holding Agent Vail hostage.

In the episode "Lockup", after being sent to jail for his involvement in the Dominic Vail kidnapping case which ended with Vail dying, Moe is convinced by NCIS to infiltrate an Islamic gang in the prison in order to get close to a suspected terrorist leader. Moe was tortured for information and executed by the terrorist leader at the end of that episode with Sam eventually discovering Moe's body. His death left Sam deeply devastated and hellbent on seeking revenge but Hetty promised him that he would get the opportunity to do so some day.

In "Harm's Way", the concluding episode and months after Moe's death, Sam soon caught up with the terrorist responsible and successfully received clearance from Vance to get his own justice for Moe. He did so by having a UAV launch a missile at the fleeing car with the terrorist leader.

The missile hit its target, resulting in the leader's death and Moe's passing being avenged.

=== Lauren Hunter ===
Senior Agent Lauren Hunter (portrayed by Claire Forlani) is the new Operations Manager, assuming charge after Hetty resigns in the second-season episode "Imposters". She was recommended for the position by Hetty herself, a claim corroborated by Director Vance. Hunter is an expert marksman, but deliberately conceals this from Callen when she notices him watching her practice on the firearms range. Hunter is a linguistics expert and in addition to English is fluent in at least six other languages, i.e. Polish, Russian, German, Italian, French, and Romani.

Prior to her introduction to the series, Hunter had spent two years undercover. She adopted the identity of Ilena Vadim, a minor member of the Comescu family, a crime syndicate based in Romania. Ilena had left Romania and settled in Argentina, wanting nothing more to do with her family and prompting Hunter to play on the family's belief that their niece would one day come back to them. She became Ilena, gathering information on the family for NCIS.

While the Special Projects team is in Romania trying to find the Comescu family, they discover that Hunter has infiltrated their ranks, and believe her to be a traitor. Hunter reveals her allegiance to the team when she shoots and kills Alexa Comescu, the head of the Comescu family. Hunter's cover within the Comescu family is so deep that not even Hetty—who was in the room when Alexa was shot—knew where her loyalties lay.

She was on a deep undercover assignment in an undisclosed country, until the Chameleon who rigged her car with a bomb, killing her. Her ghost was later seen talking to Hetty in the morgue, revealing that like Callen, Hetty had taken care of Hunter when she was seven while also stating that the first time she'd held onto Hetty's hand, Hunter hadn't been able to let go for three days.

=== Michelle Hanna (a.k.a. Quinn) ===
Michelle Hanna (portrayed by Indira G. Wilson in season 3 and Aunjanue Ellis in seasons 4–6 & 8) is Sam's wife. She is a former CIA officer, and she has a history with Sidorov (a known terrorist and arms dealer). She often goes undercover as his girlfriend/assassin. She remained dormant for a period of time after she and Sam got married and had their daughter Kamran, but she has recently gotten back into the game. Sam is extremely protective of her, although she has been shown to be more than capable of protecting herself. She has even been thrown out of a high rise (end of season four) and saves herself while Kensi is fighting other opponents. In the episode "Humbug" she surprised her husband by bringing their son Aiden home for Christmas. Unfortunately, in the two-part finale to Season Eight, she is abducted by terrorists working for Tahir Khaled (the warlord brother of Jada Khaled, a Sudanese woman Sam once employed as an intelligence asset) and tragically dies of suffocation.

=== Joelle Taylor ===
Joelle Taylor (portrayed by Elizabeth Bogush) was G. Callen's girlfriend in 2014–2016. Introduced in "War Cries", they met on a blind date arranged by Sam and Michelle, who knew her from teaching their daughter in kindergarten. She is mentioned sporadically until "Humbug". After a malware robbery Joelle's life was put in danger and Callen had to put his life in danger to save her and at the same time revealing his true identity of being an NCIS agent. She was initially hurt by this revelation, pointing out that "humbug" refers to deception, then asking Callen to leave. She later opens the door to possibly continuing their relationship if she can get to know who Callen really is.

In "Black Wind", Sam confirms that Callen and Joelle are still together. Callen also tells Deeks that Joelle is fine in "Fighting Shadows". In "Cancel Christmas" Callen reveals that he and Joelle have broken up, but they are still going to spend Christmas together to avoid being lonely.

In "Payback", Joelle is revealed to be an undercover CIA officer assigned to spy on Callen, and that she is married with a child. Despite having genuine feelings for Callen, their relationship is completely severed.

=== Anna Kolcheck ===
The estranged daughter of Arkady Kolcheck, Anastasia "Anna" Kolcheck (Bar Paly) was born in Moscow, but grew up in Champaign, Illinois and holds dual Russian and American citizenship. She joined the Chicago Police Department, where she worked as a homicide detective, before leaving the force and going to work in the private sector, specializing in security, surveillance, kidnap and ransom, and working predominantly for Russian corporate interests.

Anna was kidnapped in Moscow in order to force her father's hand. She was rescued by the NCIS Office of Special Projects and returned to the United States (although Arkady, who was also on the rescue mission, went MIA). Some months later, Anna returned the favor by joining up with the OSP in order to rescue her father, who was being held in a Russian prison along with a suspected CIA operative. During the mission, she and Callen are implied to have become romantically involved.

=== Jennifer Kim ===
Born Yujin Kim (Korean: 유진 김), Jennifer Kim (Malese Jow) is the illegitimate daughter of NCIS Assistant Director Owen Granger and works as a spy for North Korea. While in Los Angeles, her assignment was to kill other North Korean operatives in the area. She was captured by the Office of Special Projects and held in various secured facilities.

According to her, Jennifer grew up knowing that her mother worked for the government as an intelligence operative and her father was an American spy (much to the dismay of Granger, who had always assumed that her mom never told her who he was). She herself volunteered for "spy school" at the age of 12, where she was trained as an operative. NCIS Assistant Director Owen Granger spent his last days with Jennifer Kim. She buried him under a tree where he died.

=== A.J. Chegwidden ===
A.J. Chegwidden (portrayed by John M. Jackson) is the retired Judge Advocate General of the United States Navy, now in private practice in Washington, D.C., and an old friend and colleague of NCIS Operations Manager Hetty Lange.

=== Harley Hidoko ===
The executive assistant to NCIS Executive Assistant Director Shay Mosley, Baltimore native Special Agent Harley Hidoko (Andrea Bordeaux) joined NCIS after serving in Afghanistan with a Marine Female Engagement Team. She is extremely loyal to EAD Mosley, but has developed friendships with the members of the Office of Special Projects, which has led her to sometimes bend the rules when the rest of the team does. She is a widow; her husband was a fellow Marine who was killed in action.

In "Where Everybody Knows Your Name", Hidoko is revealed to be a staff sergeant in the United States Marine Corps Reserve. In the season 9 finale, upon learning the truth about Mosley's son, Hidoko travels to Mexico ahead of the team to gather intel to help rescue Derrick, but later goes missing. During the episode, an unknown person is held hostage by the Mexican cartel and is killed, being burned alive; it was initially unknown if the captive was Hidoko, leaving it unclear if she was dead or alive. At the end of the season 10 premiere, it is revealed via lab tests on the captive's remains that it was indeed Hidoko, confirming her status as dead.

=== Louis Ochoa ===
Louis Ochoa (portrayed by Esai Morales) is the NCIS Deputy Director who takes control of the Los Angeles office in Hetty's absence, and after the departure of Shay Mosley.

=== Harmon Rabb Jr. ===
Harmon Rabb (portrayed by David James Elliott) is a Naval officer who served as a pilot before transferring to the Judge Advocate General's Corps. In 2005, he was promoted to captain and originally planned to become the Force Judge Advocate in Europe until he became engaged to his long-time best friend and partner, Sarah MacKenzie. As of season 10, he has returned to the fleet and is XO on the USS Intrepid.

=== Katya Marinova ===
Katya Marinova (portrayed by Kate Miller (season 10) and Sasha Clements (season 13)) is a former Russian spy who grew up with Anna in the Soviet "Institute for Noble Maidens". Like Callen and Anna, she was conditioned as a child to become an operative.

She was in prison for being a prostitute and was cellmates with Anna. Their escape made it obvious there was more to her that meets the eye. In the season 10 episode "No More Secrets", she helps Anna to track Russian asset Pavel Volkoff. In love with Anna after they were together in prison, she later grows obsessed with Callen when he begins dating her. She develops deepfakes of him to mess with him and later to interfere in agency operations. She uses other women trained in the same institute multiple times to get near Callen and Anna. In the season 12 episodes "Red Rover, Red Rover" and "The Noble Maidens", she orders the abduction of Joelle and then uses her to lure out, capture and imprison of Anna who is later rescued by the team.

Frustrated with NCIS inability to stop her, Callen enlists Joelle's help to track Katya who has undergone plastic surgery in order to change her appearance. When he discovers that Dr. Howard Pembrook, who ran both the Soviet and the American child conditioning programs, is still alive, he surmises that Katya wants to take revenge on him. In "Down the Rabbit Hole" (season 13), Katya reveals that she has created deepfakes of the other team members as well to manipulate their investigations. She uses her resources to trick Callen into a trap to capture him and uses further deepfakes in order to throw the team from her trail and to torture him and the team with deepfaked videos. Katya soon learn that he knew where Pembrook is but decided to kill Callen because he took Anna. She is shot and killed by Joelle while waiting for the bomb she put in Callen's prison to explode, while Callen was rescued.

== Other characters ==
=== Lara Macy ===
Special Agent Lara Macy (portrayed by Louise Lombard) does not appear on NCIS: Los Angeles, but was introduced as Hetty's predecessor as OSP Operations Manager in the back-door pilot "Legend" on NCIS.

She was a former USMC Lieutenant working as a military police officer, and almost two decades earlier had investigated then-USMC Gunnery Sergeant Leroy Jethro Gibbs' role in the murder of Mexican drug lord Pedro Hernandez. Due to the past investigation, their relationship was volatile until the OSP's operational psychologist Nate Getz revealed to Gibbs that Macy had been protecting him for eighteen years by covering up the evidence. Since Hernandez was responsible for the slaying of Gibbs' wife and daughter, Macy felt that his actions against Hernandez were justified, a move that would later end up costing Macy her own life years later.

In the episode "Ambush", Hetty remarks to Director Vance that the last she'd heard, as the result of a political "witch-hunt", Macy was "working out of a quonset hut in Djibouti". This was contradicted on a subsequent episode of NCIS, where Macy's personnel file states that she never worked in Djibouti but was instead reassigned to Marseille, to head up an NCIS undercover team there. While there, she also began working on a rape case involving a Petty Officer Second Class before Macy later returned to the United States.

In the NCIS episode "Patriot Down", badly burnt remains were discovered in Annapolis with NCIS Special Agent Timothy McGee confirming that the remains were those of Macy, leaving the NCIS Washington D.C. major case response team and agency itself devastated. It was later revealed that Macy had been brutally murdered and her body set alight with her killer being revealed as Jason Paul Dean, a mercenary and former U.S. Army Ranger, as part of a plot to get to Gibbs in relation to the Hernandez case.

=== Aiden Hanna ===
Aiden (portrayed by Tye White) is the son of Sam Hanna and his wife Michelle. He is elder brother of Kamren.

His existence is first touched on when Sam reveals he has kids in Season 2, though he was not formally introduced until Season 3.

=== Kamren Hanna ===
Kamren is the daughter of Sam Hanna and his wife Michelle, as well as the younger sister of Aiden.

Her existence is first touched on when Sam reveals he has kids in Season 2, though they were not formally introduced until Season 3. Sam mentioned his overprotective nature towards his daughter when she was young in order to get a woman who was a victim of a shooting to open up to him.

=== Alexandra Reynolds ===
Alexandra is the daughter of Nikita Rezinokov and his lover Katerina Pulonin, as well as the younger half-sister of Agent G. Callen.

Her existence is first revealed in Season 8 when Nikita revealed to Callen of his other daughter. After her mother was poisoned, Callen and Nikita decided to reveal their status as her family.

In Season 9, she has cultivated a familial bond with the pair.

=== Jake Reynolds ===
Jake is the son of Alexandra Reynolds and Pacey Reynolds as well as the half nephew of NCIS agent G. Callen.

=== Rosa Reyes ===
Rosa Reyes is a young Guatemalan immigrant seeking asylum in the United States and the adopted daughter of NCIS Special Agent Kensi Blye and NCIS Investigator Marty Deeks.
