= NCIS: Los Angeles season 13 =

NCIS: Los Angeles
- Season 13
- Season 13 U.S. DVD cover
- Starring: Chris O'Donnell; Daniela Ruah; Eric Christian Olsen; Medalion Rahimi; Caleb Castille; Gerald McRaney; LL Cool J
- No. of episodes: 22

Release
- Original network: CBS
- Original release: October 10, 2021 – May 22, 2022

Season chronology
- ← Previous; Season 12 Next → Season 14

The thirteenth season of the American police procedural television series NCIS: Los Angeles premiered on October 10, 2021, on CBS, for the 2021–22 television season, and ended on May 22, 2022.

NCIS: Los Angeles follows a fictional team of special agents from the Office of Special Projects of the Naval Criminal Investigative Service. The series stars Chris O'Donnell, Daniela Ruah, Eric Christian Olsen, Medalion Rahimi, Caleb Castille, Gerald McRaney, and LL Cool J. McRaney was promoted to series regular prior to the season following the departures of Barrett Foa and Renée Felice Smith after the previous season and Linda Hunt this season. The season consisted of 22 episodes and includes the 300th episode of the series.

== Cast and characters ==
=== Main ===
- Chris O'Donnell as Grisha "G." Callen, NCIS Supervisory Special Agent (SSA) and Team leader
- Daniela Ruah as Kensi Blye, NCIS Special Agent
- Eric Christian Olsen as Marty Deeks, NCIS Investigator (Previously LAPD/NCIS Liaison Officer)
- Medalion Rahimi as Fatima Namazi, NCIS Special Agent
- Caleb Castille as Devin Roundtree, NCIS Special Agent (Previously FBI Agent)
- Gerald McRaney as Hollace Kilbride, a retired Admiral and friend of Henrietta Lange, later Operations Manager
- LL Cool J as Sam Hanna, NCIS Senior Field Agent, Second in Command

=== Recurring ===
- Olesya Rulin as Zasha Gagarin, former Russian spy
- Elizabeth Bogush as Joelle Taylor, CIA Agent and former girlfriend of Callen
- Duncan Campbell as NCIS Special Agent Castor
- Briana Marin as Aliyah de León, NCIS Supervisory Special Agent
- Peter Cambor as Nate Getz, NCIS Special Agent and Operational Psychologist
- Kavi Ramachandran Ladnier as Shyla Dahr, NCIS Reserve Agent
- Bar Paly as Anatasia 'Anna' Kolcheck, Former ATF Agent and Callen's girlfriend, later fiancée
- Vyto Ruginis as Arkady Kolcheck, former KGB Operative, associate of Callen, and Anna's father
- Sasha Clements as Katya Miranova, nemesis of Callen and Anna
- Natalia Del Riego as Rosa Reyes, migrant seeking asylum, later fostered by Kensi and Deeks
- Josie Navar as Pilar, migrant aided by Kensi and Deeks
- Christine Horn as Elliot Reynolds, social worker aiding asylum candidates
- Cyd Strittmatter as Janice King, foster inspector and coordinator
- Richard Gant as former Colonel Raymond Hanna, father of Sam

=== Guest ===
- Linda Hunt as Henrietta Lange, NCIS Supervisory Special Agent (SSA) and Operations Manager
- Jolene Key as NCIS Special Agent Afloat Denise Morgan
- Stephanie Lemelin as Retired Marine Gunnery Sergeant Mary Smith
- Bill Goldberg as Lance Hamilton, DOJ Agent
- Erik Palladino as Special Deputy U.S. Marshal Vostanik Sabatino
- Karina Logue as LAPD Detective Ellen Whiting, Internal Affairs
- Jeff Kober as Harris Keane, former member of Hetty's team during the Vietnam War
- Ava McCoy as Jordyn Roundtree, sister of Devin
- Ashwin Gore as ONI Inspector General Akhil Ali
- Jere Burns as Arnold Baines, former Soviet training officer at the Institute of Noble Maidens and former CIA Agent in charge of the Drona Project
- Mercedes Mason as Talia del Campo, DEA Agent

== Episodes ==
No. overall	No. in season	Title	Directed by	Written by	Original release date	Prod. code	U.S. viewers (millions)
281	1	"Subject 17"	Dennis Smith	R. Scott Gemmill	October 10, 2021	1304	5.85
While Callen suspects Hetty of keeping disturbing secrets about his past and Joelle surfaces in her quest to capture Katya, NCIS must track down Russian informant Zasha Gagarin (Olesya Rulin) whose life is in danger. Meanwhile, Kensi and Deeks continue their efforts to expand their family.
282	2	"Fukushu"	Dennis Smith	Kyle Harimoto	October 17, 2021	1302	5.62
NCIS takes the case personally when an LAPD officer's father, a beloved elderly Japanese American veteran, is the victim of a vicious hate crime.
283	3	"Indentured"	Eric A. Pot	Frank Military	October 24, 2021	1303	5.78
Sam and Kilbride clash when a case involving an arms dealer responsible for the slaughter of ATF agents leads them to a well-connected colonel and friend of Kilbride, accused of supplying militia groups with guns.
284	4	"Sorry for Your Loss"	Eric A. Pot	Chad Mazero	October 31, 2021	1301	5.07
As Callen continues hunting Katya, Kilbride enlists NCIS help to find a truckload of stolen guns; the assignment becomes more challenging when their suspect, the son of a mob boss planning to sell the weapons, is found dead.
285	5	"Divided We Fall"	Terence Nightingall	Andrew Bartels	November 7, 2021	1305	5.37
When an NCIS mission to protect a compromised undercover agent goes completely sideways, the agents are individually interrogated to find out what really happened; Kilbride must make a difficult decision.
286	6	"Sundown"	Suzanne Saltz	Lee A. Carlisle	November 21, 2021	1306	5.21
Sam negotiates, and Roundtree goes undercover, when a man takes a busload of hostages and threatens to blow it up unless his daughter's war crimes are posthumously cleared.
287	7	"Lost Sailor Down"	Daniela Ruah	Indira Wilson	January 2, 2022	1307	5.17
The NCIS team investigates the apparent suicide of a Navy intelligence officer who leapt to his death after taking LSD. Also, while Kensi is away at the Mexican border, Deeks makes plans to redo the backyard without her input.
288	8	"A Land of Wolves"	Tawnia McKiernan	Justin Kohlas & Adam George Key	January 9, 2022	1308	5.30
The NCIS team, joined by Special Agent Aliyah de León (Briana Martin), scrambles to find Kensi, when she is attacked and kidnapped by a mysterious militia group while helping a group of migrants cross the border. While captured, Kensi bonds with one of the migrants captured with her, a teenage girl seeking a new life in the United States.
289	9	"Under the Influence"	John Peter Kousakis	Anastasia Kousakis	February 27, 2022	1309	5.53
The NCIS team, assisted once again by Agent De León, helps a U.S. ambassador search for her missing daughter, Gia (Caitlin Carmichael), a popular social media influencer, after she is kidnapped. The team is shocked when the kidnappers force Gia to ask her followers to raise ransom money and a counter-campaign of misogynists begins raising money for the kidnappers to execute her live on social media.
290	10	"Where Loyalties Lie"	Tawnia McKiernan	Matt Klafter	March 6, 2022	1310	5.45
The NCIS team is called in when a civilian scientist working with the Marines on development of advanced radar technology is killed and the technology stolen. The team pinpoints the perpetrators as a white nationalist group attempting to bomb an immigrant center with explosives supplied by the Chinese government in exchange for the radar. Though the group is killed and a Chinese operative arrested, the technology remains unaccounted for. Meanwhile, Callen is confused when his doctor insists that the two had a phone meeting in recent days. The episode ends with an unidentified figure walking away from a computer that has been programmed with the deepfake technology, first seen in "Impostor Syndrome" (12x15), to mimic Callen's face and voice.
291	11	"All the Little Things"	Terrence O'Hara	R. Scott Gemmill	March 13, 2022	1311	5.34
Kensi and Deeks are called to the USS Allegiance to help uncover the identities of the parents of a newborn baby found in the ship's cargo space. Meanwhile, Kilbride calls in former OSP team member Nate Getz for advice on helping Callen, who is frantically searching for Hetty after a United States drone strike on Al Qaeda occurs at her last known location in Syria. The two also discuss the Drona Project - the CIA operation in the 1970s run by Hetty that groomed young children, including a freshly orphaned Callen, into future American operatives. The episode ends with Anna walking into the boatshed while talking to Callen, only for Callen to already be there and clueless about the conversation. Callen then video chats with the deep fake version of himself on Anna's phone, operated by Katya, warning that she is coming for them.
292	12	"Murmuration"	James Hanlon	Samantha Chasse	March 20, 2022	1312	5.60
The OSP team is called in to investigate when an unidentified aircraft crashes into a Navy fighter jet from the USS Allegiance. The investigation turns on its head, however, when the UAP (unidentified aerial phenomena) is revealed to be a drone swarm purchased by the D.O.D. and operated by a rogue AI system that is testing its learning capabilities against the US Navy, the "greatest potential opponent" the system could train itself against. Meanwhile, Deeks and Kensi begin to prepare for their foster inspection, arguing over the numerous purchases the former has made in an attempt to curry favor with the inspector.
293	13	"Bonafides"	Terrence O'Hara	Kyle Harimoto	March 27, 2022	1313	5.21
When DOJ Agent Lance Hamilton's partner is killed, Sam dons his previous undercover persona of "Switch" to find the culprit. Also, Kensi, Deeks, Roundtree, and Kilbride work to catch an aerospace engineer who stole classified Navy schematics.
294	14	"Pandora's Box"	Daniela Ruah	Chad Mazero & Lee A. Carlisle	March 27, 2022	1314	4.91
NCIS investigates the robbery of a high-end art storage facility by going undercover as potential buyers on the black market, to find who is behind the stolen items.
295	15	"Perception"	Benny Boom	Faythallegrea Claude	April 10, 2022	1315	5.26
Roundtree and his younger sister are pulled over by police and treated harshly in a clear case of racial profiling, leaving the OSP team enraged. Also, NCIS investigates the death of a Navy photographer who was assigned to document the building of a new weapons station.
296	16	"MWD"	Suzanne Saltz	R. Scott Gemmill	April 17, 2022	1316	5.64
NCIS investigates the kidnapping of Master Sergeant Boomer, a military working dog. Meanwhile, Sam looks to sell his boat so he can take care of his father who is suffering from Alzheimer's, and Callen meets with Nate to discuss the troubling series of recent events surrounding his life.
297	17	"Genesis"	John Peter Kousakis	Andrew Bartels	April 24, 2022	1317	5.65
The team helps Naval intelligence officer Akhil Ali locate a fellow officer who went missing while recruiting foreign assets as potential sources of intelligence; Callen, with the aid of Nate, works to track a man he believes is the individual who trained both himself and Katya.
298	18	"Hard for the Money"	Rick Tunell	Matt Klafter & Indira Gibson Wilson	May 1, 2022	1318	5.21
NCIS, with help from Sabatino, investigates the murder of a woman employed in the Navy's missile defense program and its connection to stolen Navy missile technology. Callen is pulled from field duty due to the deep fakes sent by Katya voicing scandalous messages to numerous individuals, including Kilbride and SECNAV; however, Callen uses the time to hunt for Katya. A strict social worker stresses out Deeks; Sam debates selling his boat.
299	19	"Live Free or Die Standing"	Daniela Ruah	Eric Christian Olsen	May 1, 2022	1319	5.19
The NCIS team works with DEA Agent Talia Del Campo to find a missing whistleblower set to testify against gun manufacturers marketing to drug cartels; the team is charmed when Eric sends everyone money with the instruction to buy something they each have always wanted.
300	20	"Work & Family"	Dennis Smith	R. Scott Gemmill	May 8, 2022	1320	5.18
NCIS investigates after two men are blown up by their own explosives while attempting to break into a military base; Callen wants to take the next step with Anna; Sam moves in with his father.
301	21	"Down the Rabbit Hole"	Frank Military	Frank Military	May 15, 2022	1321	5.33
The OSP team scrambles to locate Callen after he falls into a trap laid by Katya and is kidnapped. With aid from Joelle and Anna, the team outsmarts Katya's deep fakes, psychological warfare, and false leads to rescue their leader. In the midst of the chaos, Joelle murders Katya and her ally in retaliation for losing her leg at Katya's hand.
302	22	"Come Together"	John Peter Kousakis	Kyle Harimoto	May 22, 2022	1322	4.44
The team hunts for a crew that robs a Los Angeles casino with military-grade power. Meanwhile, Kensi and Deeks learn that their adoption request for Rosa has been approved, officially making them foster parents. Following the case, the team surprises Rosa with a beach party, where Callen, after hearing Anna's desire to live the rest of her life with him, finally proposes to her.

== Production ==
=== Development ===
On April 23, 2021, it was announced that CBS had renewed NCIS: Los Angeles for a thirteenth season. Series regular Eric Christian Olsen wrote the nineteenth episode of the season, while fellow series regular Daniela Ruah directed the episode. On January 5, 2022, it was reported that production had been suspended until February due to the COVID Omicron variant.

=== Casting ===
When the series was renewed, it was announced that series stars Chris O'Donnell and LL Cool J had signed deals to return. On May 24, 2021, it was revealed that Barrett Foa and Renée Felice Smith would be leaving the series after the twelfth season. Later that day it was confirmed that Linda Hunt would be returning for the season, after only appearing occasionally during the previous season. However, Hunt only appeared in the season premiere, and was absent for the rest of the season. On June 2, 2021, it was announced that Gerald McRaney had been promoted to series regular for the season.

== Release ==
On May 19, 2021, it was announced that the series would keep its Sunday 9:00 PM ET timeslot. On July 12, 2021, it was revealed that the season would premiere on October 10, 2021. The series continued to air after The Equalizer leading into SEAL Team for its first four episodes. Afterwards, the series led into S.W.A.T.

In the United Kingdom, Season 13 of NCIS: Los Angeles gave up its traditional December premiere slot to allow the final season of NCIS: New Orleans to be aired, on April 27, 2022 Sky Max set the Season 13 premiere date for May 15, 2022.

== Ratings ==
Viewership and ratings per episode of NCIS: Los Angeles season 13
No.	Title	Air date	Rating (18–49)	Viewers (millions)	DVR (18–49)	DVR viewers (millions)	Total (18–49)	Total viewers (millions)
1	"Subject 17"	October 10, 2021	0.7	5.85	—N/a	—N/a	—N/a	n/a (Note: Live+7 ratings were unavailable, so Live+3 ratings have been used instead.)
2	"Fukushu"	October 17, 2021	0.6	5.62	—N/a	—N/a	—N/a	—N/a
3	"Indentured"	October 24, 2021	0.6	5.78	0.2	2.05	0.8	7.83
4	"Sorry for Your Loss"	October 31, 2021	0.5	5.07	—N/a	—N/a	—N/a	—N/a
5	"Divided We Fall"	November 7, 2021	0.5	5.37	—N/a	—N/a	—N/a	—N/a
6	"Sundown"	November 21, 2021	0.5	5.21	0.3	2.04	0.8	7.25
7	"Lost Sailor Down"	January 2, 2022	0.5	5.17	—N/a	—N/a	—N/a	—N/a
8	"A Land of Wolves"	January 9, 2022	0.5	5.30	—N/a	—N/a	—N/a	—N/a
9	"Under the Influence"	February 27, 2022	0.5	5.53	—N/a	—N/a	—N/a	—N/a
10	"Where Loyalties Lie"	March 6, 2022	0.5	5.45	—N/a	—N/a	—N/a	—N/a
11	"All the Little Things"	March 13, 2022	0.4	5.34	—N/a	—N/a	—N/a	—N/a
12	"Murmuration"	March 20, 2022	0.5	5.60	—N/a	—N/a	—N/a	—N/a
13	"Bonafides"	March 27, 2022	0.6	5.21	—N/a	—N/a	—N/a	—N/a
14	"Pandora's Box"	March 27, 2022	0.5	4.91	—N/a	—N/a	—N/a	—N/a
15	"Perception"	April 10, 2022	0.4	5.26	—N/a	—N/a	—N/a	—N/a
16	"MWD"	April 17, 2022	0.6	5.64	—N/a	—N/a	—N/a	—N/a
17	"Genesis"	April 24, 2022	0.5	5.65	—N/a	—N/a	—N/a	—N/a
18	"Hard for the Money"	May 1, 2022	0.4	5.21	—N/a	—N/a	—N/a	—N/a
19	"Live Free or Die Standing"	May 1, 2022	0.4	5.19	—N/a	—N/a	—N/a	—N/a
20	"Work & Family"	May 8, 2022	0.4	5.18	—N/a	—N/a	—N/a	—N/a
21	"Down the Rabbit Hole"	May 15, 2022	0.4	5.33	—N/a	—N/a	—N/a	—N/a
22	"Come Together"	May 22, 2022	0.4	4.44	0.17	5.44	—N/a	9.88

== Home media ==
NCIS: Los Angeles: The Thirteenth Season
Set details	Special features	
22 episodes; 5-disc set; Subtitles: English		
DVD release dates
Region 1	Region 2	Region 4
August 23, 2022	TBA	N/a
Blu-ray release dates
Region A		Region B
TBA		TBA
