= Bar Paly =

Israeli-American actress

- בר פאלי
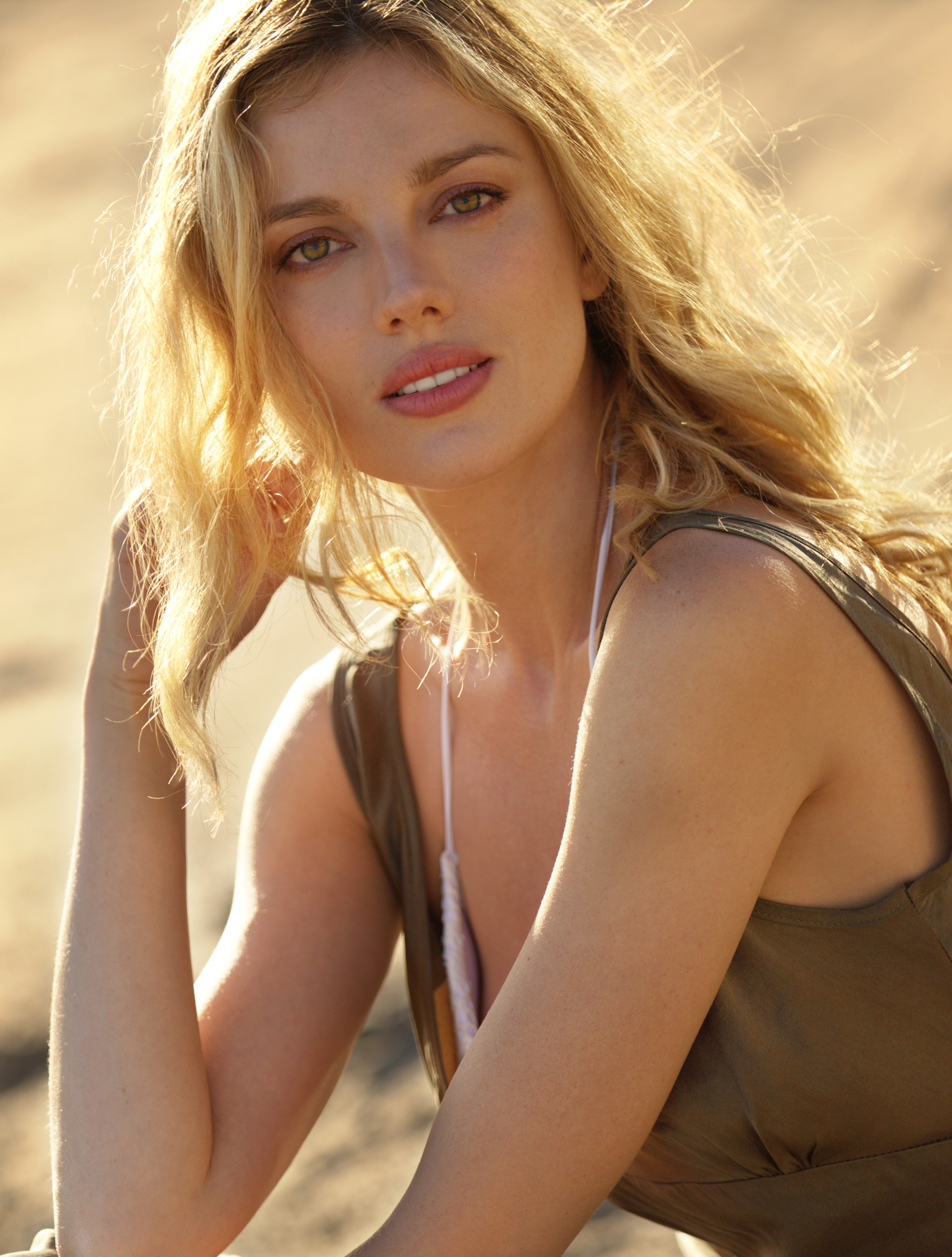
- Paly in 2016
- Born: Varvara Alexandrovna Paley; Nizhny Tagil, Russian SFSR, USSR
- Citizenship: Israel; United States (from 2016)
- Occupations: Actress; model
- Years active: 2003–present
- Height: 5 ft 8.5 in (1.74 m)
- Modelling information
- Hair colour: Light Blond
- Eye colour: Amber
- Agency: Traffic Models

Bar Paly (Note: Hebrew: בר פאלי) (born Varvara Alexandrovna Paley) (Note: Russian: Варвара Палей) is a Russian born, Israeli-American actress and model.

== Early life ==
Paly was born Varvara Alexandrovna Paley in Nizhny Tagil, Russia (former USSR), to Olga (née Drob) and Alexander Paley. Her grandfathers served in the Soviet Red Army during World War II. She was passionate about music in her childhood, playing the piano from age four. Her family immigrated to Israel when she was nine, and she was raised in Tel Aviv, Israel. In her school days, her interest in acting led her to enroll at the Aleph High School of Arts Tel Aviv-Yafo, Israel, where she performed in a number of productions by William Shakespeare and Bertolt Brecht, such as the play Antigone.

== Career ==
=== Modelling ===
Paly began a career in modeling at the age of 17. She has appeared as a cover girl in several magazines, including Maxim, Rolling Stone and GQ.

She posed for the cover of Esquire's Latin American edition in May 2014.

=== Acting ===
In 2003, she began her career as an actress appearing in a variety of roles for television and appeared in the Israeli mockumentary television film Zehirut Matzlema.

Paly has appeared in TV's How I Met Your Mother, The Starter Wife, and the 2008 horror film The Ruins.

In 2013, Paly held roles in both Roman Coppola's A Glimpse Inside the Mind of Charles Swan III starring Charlie Sheen, Jason Schwartzman and Bill Murray.

She also had a supporting role in Michael Bay's Pain & Gain, alongside Mark Wahlberg and Dwayne Johnson.

She also starred in the 2014 action thriller film Non-Stop, opposite Liam Neeson.

From 2015 to 2023, Paly had a recurring role as Anastasia "Anna" Kolcheck on the American crime drama NCIS: Los Angeles.

Between 2017 and 2018, she played Helen of Troy in the Arrowverse show DC's Legends of Tomorrow.

== Personal life ==
Paly is of Russian Jewish descent. In August 2016, Paly became a naturalized U.S. citizen.

== Filmography ==
Film roles
Year	Title	Role	Notes
2003	Zehirut Matzlema	Divi	Television film
2008	The Ruins	Archeologist	
2012	A Glimpse Inside the Mind of Charles Swan III	Maria-Carla	
2013	Pain & Gain	Sorina Luminita	
2014	Non-Stop	Iris Marianne	
2014	Million Dollar Arm	Lisette	
2015	Street Level	Shelby	
2016	Urge	Denise	
2016	Lost Girls	Kara	Short film
2019	Against the Clock	Lauren De Isigney	

Television roles
Year	Title	Role	Notes
2007	CSI: NY	Mia Opal	Episode: "Heart of Glass"
2008	The Starter Wife	Lola	Recurring role, 5 episodes
2008	Unhitched	Chloe	Episode: "Yorkshire Terrier Sucked Into the Internet"
2010	How I Met Your Mother	Natalia	Episode: "Rabbit or Duck"
2012	Underemployed	Tatiana	Recurring role, 2 episodes
2012	Game Shop	Faux-Nerd	Episode: "Faux Nerd Girl"
2015	Parental Indiscretion	Taylor	Episode: "Bad Blood Test"
2015–2023	NCIS: Los Angeles	Anastasia "Anna" Kolcheck	Recurring role (season 6–14), 34 episodes
2016	Jean-Claude Van Johnson	Krisztina	Episode: Pilot
2016	Training Day	Natalia Vostok	Episode #1.1
2017	Bosch	Leni	Episode: "The Four Last Things"
2017–2018	DC's Legends of Tomorrow	Helen of Troy	Episodes: "Helen Hunt", "The Good, The Bad and The Cuddly"
2018	iZombie	Amanda Lewis	Episode: "Don't Hate the Player, Hate the Brain"

Video game roles
Year	Title	Role	Notes
2011	L.A. Noire	Marguerite Cansito	
