= List of NCIS: Hawaiʻi characters =

This is an overview of regular and recurring characters on the TV series NCIS: Hawaiʻi.

== Overview ==
Actor	Character	Season		
Actor	Character	1	2	3
Vanessa Lachey	Jane Tennant	Main	Main	Main
Alex Tarrant	Kai Holman	Main	Main	Main
Noah Mills	Jesse Boone	Main	Main	Main
Yasmine Al-Bustami	Lucy Tara	Main	Main	Main
Jason Antoon	Ernie Malik	Main	Main	Main
Tori Anderson	Kate Whistler	Main	Main	Main
Kian Talan	Alex Tennant	Main	Main	G

== Main characters ==
=== Jane Tennant ===
Jane Tennant
- First appearance: "Pilot"
- Portrayed by: Vanessa Lachey; Ronda Kahana Williams- (young Jane Tennant)
- Other appearances: NCIS; NCIS: Los Angeles

In-universe information
- Gender: Female
- Title: Pearl Harbor Special Agent in Charge (NCIS)
- Occupation: Supervisory Special Agent (NCIS)

Jane Tennant (portrayed by Vanessa Lachey) is the first female Special Agent-in-Charge of the NCIS: Hawaiʻi Field Office.

Born in Hawaii, Jane regularly moved around a lot due to her father being in the military. It's currently unknown if her parents are still alive or dead and if she is an only child or if she has any siblings.

When Jane was twelve years old, her father was stationed in Tama Hills, Japan and while there, young Jane took riding lessons. At the age of sixteen, Jane experienced racism as people began questioning where she came from as she didn't look like anyone. She informed them she was American but not everyone believed her with Jane later informing she didn't know where her mother really came from.

Jane later attended the University of Virginia, graduating with a double major in psychology and global studies. Following her graduation, she was headhunted by various government agencies who sought to recruit her with the State Department having a strong interest in her. Jane chose to apply to the Central Intelligence Agency where she met operative Maggie Shaw, who became her boss and mentor as well as her best friend, Jane unaware Maggie was in fact a traitor and a spy for the Chinese.

The undercover assignments Jane had with the CIA often had her overseas for long periods of time. At some point, she married Daniel Tennant, taking on his surname and had two children, Alex and Julie, six years apart.

During an operation in Kabul, Afghanistan, she met NCIS Supervisory Special Agent Leroy Jethro Gibbs and Special Agent Anthony DiNozzo Junior with Gibbs being impressed by Maggie's skillset and he wanted her to join with Gibbs leaving a business card for Jane with Rule 72, "Always be open to new ideas" written out on the back with Jane receiving it some time later.

In 2011, when Maggie put in for a desk job at the CIA's Headquarters in Langley, Virginia, she advised Jane to leave the CIA and join the Naval Criminal Investigative Service (NCIS) so she could be closer to her then-husband and children.

Upon officially joining NCIS, Jane began attending classes at the Federal Law Enforcement Training Center (FLETC), one of her instructors being Greta Ford with Jane also graduating at the top of her class. At some point, during her career, she received the Medal of Merit three times, becoming the only NCIS agent to do so.

Upon joining NCIS, Jane served in numerous other areas before transferring to Hawaii. After some time as an agent working out of Hawaii, she was promoted to Special Agent in Charge of the NCIS Hawai'i Team. For unknown reasons, Jane and Daniel divorced in 2018 with Jane presumably gaining primary custody of their children. They originally tried counselling to save their marriage but it failed. Jane and Daniel remain friends to this day although things can be strained between them at times.

A year prior to the events of the Pilot, the NCIS: Hawaii team consisted of Jane, her second-in-command, Jesse Boone and a man named Jim Carter but at some point, according to Jesse, Jane fired Carter for putting himself above the team with Carter's replacement being NCIS Special Agent Lucy Tara.

At some point, another position on her team became vacant or was presumably created, Jane interviewed fifty highly-qualified candidates for the position including NCIS agent Kai Holman with Kai joining the team two weeks prior to the Pilot.

Jane showed professional leadership and sensitivity towards details of the team cases, which brought her respect from all team members. She treasured his colleagues like family, but this also put her into huge pressure when the members were involved in betrayal or sacrifice. Whether her mental state was sufficient for continuing to serve as team leader was challenged many times throughout her career.

=== Kai Holman ===
Kai Holman
- First appearance: "Pilot"
- Portrayed by: Alex Tarrant

In-universe information
- Gender: Male
- Occupation: Special Agent (NCIS)

Kai Holman (portrayed by Alex Tarrant) is a new NCIS agent on the team who recently returned home to care for his father.

Born in Waimanalo, Hawaii, Kai was the son of Wally Holman and an unnamed woman. During his youth, Kai participated in the Interscholastic League and to this day, still holds the record for the most strikeouts. Years later, Kai's mother became sick and ultimately died, her death devastating Kai who chose to leave Hawaii altogether, joining the United States Marine Corps with his departure straining his relationship with his father. When he was on the mainland for the first time at the age of eighteen, Kai had his first racist experience: while he was off-base, a car passed and the people inside told Kai to go back to Mexico, unaware that Kai was in fact from Hawaii.

During his time in the Marines, Kai presumably served overseas and was presumably discharged with the rank of Staff Sergeant with 3rd Assault Amphibian Battalion. Kai then began working with the United States Marine Corps Criminal Investigation Division,(Marine CID), remaining with the CID for three years before he quit and joined NCIS, undergoing training at the Federal Law Enforcement Training Centre or FLETC before he graduated when one of his instructors told him stories of NCIS Special Agent G. Callen, an agent assigned to the NCIS Office of Special Projects in Los Angeles, California.

Upon discovering his father was ill, Kai learned of a vacant spot on the NCIS: Hawaii team led by NCIS Special Agent in Charge Jane Tennant with Kai being among fifty candidates who applied for the job, Jane personally interviewing every single one including Kai himself and eventually, Kai got the position, joining the team two weeks prior to the pilot. Kai then becomes the major character in many cases involving Hawai'i local communities.

At some point, he also became owner to a dog named Inoki.

=== Jesse Boone ===
Jesse Boone
- First appearance: "Pilot"
- Portrayed by: Noah Mills
- Other appearances: NCIS

In-universe information
- Gender: Male
- Title: Second-In-Command (NCIS)
- Occupation: Special Agent (NCIS)

Jesse Boone (portrayed by Noah Mills) is Tennant's confidant and second-in-command. Boone was a homicide detective in Washington, D.C., and knows the islands' hiking trails well.

Born in an unknown State, Jesse is the son of an unnamed man who was an engineer and an unnamed woman with Jesse also having a sister who's divorced. Jesse's grandfather was an outdoors man who taught him everything he knew about the woods.

During his time in Washington D.C., Jesse worked as a police officer and spent three years on the D.C.'s Joint Robbery Task Force and would spend many hours interrogating suspects and working on numerous cases. At the same time, though, he often received write-ups for insubordination.

One night, two of his colleagues, Hitchcock and Gomez, responded to a call concerning an overdose involving the drug fentanyl, with the two men dying in the process, an incident that still haunts Jesse to this day. Jesse also investigated a case involving the murder of a female student, Jessica Gains who was attending Georgetown University and was strangled to death a week before her graduation was due to take place. He later started a habit of asking the lab to run the DNA found on her body once every year in the hope of getting a match and identifying a possible suspect for the killing but so far, the case has remained cold.

At some point, Jesse met Heather and married her, the couple having three children including a girl named Gracie and a boy named Jake with the couple also owning a cat and dog.

Sometime later, Jesse left the police, joining NCIS and undergoing training at FLETC before he graduated. He was later assigned to the NCIS: Hawai'i team which presumably saw him moving his family to the island and soon became the Senior Special Agent of the team as well as the second-in-command of the team.

While living in Hawai'i, Jesse developed a love for surfing and even began spending time at conversation weekends. He also spends his time helping to clean campsites while occasionally hiking, allowing him to use a paper map. He showed strong fitness and survival skills developed since early years, but he considered his courage is not at peak level anymore after taking up the father role. He also find difficulties in completing the administration work when Jane is absent as the team leader.

In spite of being a haole (an outsider) Jesse has a lot of respect for Hawaiian culture and nature.

=== Lucy Tara ===
Lucy Tara
- First appearance: "Pilot"
- Portrayed by: Yasmine Al-Bustami
- Other appearances: NCIS: Los Angeles

In-universe information
- Gender: Female
- Occupation: Junior Field Special Agent (NCIS)

Lucy Tara (portrayed by Yasmine Al-Bustami) is the junior field agent of NCIS: Hawaiʻi.

Born in Texas, Lucy is the daughter of an unnamed couple with Lucy having two older brothers and a sister.

Presumably after attending high school, Lucy attended a college and graduated from it. During her time in college, she displayed talent in poker and even played a lot online, having an account called "LuckyLucy007" but she retired the account. She later had a summer congressional internship where she carried other duties and gained the ability to read upside down.

Her parents were disappointed when Lucy revealed to them she wanted to have a career in law enforcement rather than go into the family oil business. When her sister held a bachelorette party, Lucy skipped it due to it taking part in a karaoke club. Lucy then joined NCIS, attended FLETC and graduated from it.

A year prior to the Pilot, as a result of Jim Carter being fired from the team, Lucy eventually joined the team as his replacement. After several missions, Lucy take the chance to confess her favorability towards Kate, and eventually get into relationship and cohabitation. Despite empathy developed among team members and many case protection targets, Lucy seldom mentioned the dark side of her past.

=== Ernie Malik ===
Ernie Malik
- First appearance: "Pilot"
- Portrayed by: Jason Antoon
- Other appearances: NCIS

In-universe information
- Gender: Male
- Occupation: Cyber Specialist (NCIS)

Ernie Malik (portrayed by Jason Antoon) is NCIS: Hawaiʻi's cyber intelligence specialist.

Born in an unknown state in the U.S., Ernie lived with his father and mother. However, Ernie's unnamed father wasn't around a lot during his childhood due to the fact that he was cheating on his wife with various girlfriends.

When Ernie was seven years old, his mother, tired of her husband's cheating, ended up kicking her husband out of the house for good with Ernie's father living nearly a mile away from them. As such, Ernie grew up with only his mother in his life.

Refusing to be disappointed about his father's absence, Ernie began focusing on his education and was accepted to every single college he applied to with a full ride. He ultimately went to CalTech and presumably graduated.

After that, Ernie tried to show his father what he had accomplished without him, only to discover his father had moved to South Carolina months before, then dying in August 2022 and leaving Ernie his house. Presumably after college, Ernie joined the NSA and spent an unknown number of years working with the agency, composing various files on numerous criminals.

He later resigned from the NSA, heading to NCIS where he now works as the main computer specialist on the NCIS Hawaii team. Due to strong efficiency in completing the data research and computer technology tasks, he had many spare time to go deep into special interests, and revealed new hobbies each time the team members find him. Nevertheless, he sometimes feel lonely when it comes to searching for his true love.

=== Kate Whistler ===
Kate Whistler
- First appearance: "Pilot"
- Portrayed by: Tori Anderson

In-universe information
- Gender: Female
- Occupation: Federal Agent (FBI); NCIS-FBI liaison Intelligence Officer (DIA; formerly)

Kathrine "Kate" Marie Whistler (portrayed by Tori Anderson) is a former Defense Intelligence Agency (DIA) Officer. Later on she became a Federal Bureau of Investigation (FBI) Special Agent and NCIS-FBI liaison.

Born in an unknown State, Whistler was the daughter of an unnamed couple and also the sister of Noah Whistler.

After finishing high school, she began attending Northwestern University where she was also part of a sorority while Noah went on to join the United States Marine Corps, rising to the rank of Captain. In 2009, tragedy struck when Noah died during an ambush in Taji, Iraq.

After presumably graduating from Northwestern, Kate practiced for some time before she ultimately joined the DIA. While with the DIA, she was stationed in DC and while at a conference in Hawai'i, met NCIS Special Agent Lucy Tara at a bar.

At some point, an unnamed FBI Special Agent in Charge took Kate under his wing, serving as her mentor.

In later years, Whistler became a liaison between the DIA and NCIS, often arriving at NCIS Hawaii Headquarters in Pearl Harbor to provide NCIS Special Agent Jane Tennant and her team with information concerning their latest case, essentially cutting across a lot of red tape or to warn them to back off if her DIA superiors believed the case the NCIS Hawai'i team was investigating had access to highly-classified knowledge the team wasn't cleared for.

It is also presumed that her job at the DIA was that of an officer as she was not seen carrying a sidearm or working in the field.

Jane and other agents always treat her as an important member of the team after the long-term cooperation, that she also contributed more after developing feelings with Lucy. Though she mostly worked on investigation, she took up more physical training with Jane and Lucy, and showed strength in depth for occasions that put her into life threatening danger.

=== Alex Tennant ===
Alex Tennant (portrayed by Kian Talan) is Jane Tennant's son and eldest child. He was facing many teenage matters towards his role in school baseball team, his love interest and choice of higher education. Over the course of season 2 and 3, Alex was successfully admitted to the naval academy.

== Recurring characters ==
=== Joe Milius ===
Captain Joe Milius (portrayed by Enver Gjokaj) is the Deputy Chief of Staff to Commander, Pacific Fleet, who is later reassigned to the Pentagon. He is also Jane's love interest; when his transfer was official, the two finally consummated their relationship.

At the end of Season 1, he respected Jane's decision of staying in Hawai'i. In Season 2, he shortly returned and provided help to Alex's admission to the naval academy.

=== Julie Tennant ===
Julie Tennant (portrayed by Mahina Napoleon) is Jane Tennant's daughter and youngest child.

=== Maggie Shaw ===
Maggie Shaw (portrayed by Julie White) is a former agent with the CIA, who served as the mentor and friend of NCIS Special Agent in Charge Jane Tennant. However, she was revealed to be a double agent/spy for the Chinese and the mother of wanted spy Bao. Despite her self-interest in the cases involved, she and Jane treasured their bittersweet relationship that they did not hesitate to sacrifice for each other.

=== Norman 'Boom Boom' Gates ===
Captain Norman 'Boom Boom' Gates (portrayed by Sharif Atkins) is a reserved Gunnery Sergeant in the United States Marine Corps and also an explosive expert with the NCIS: Hawai'i team as well as a member of the Explosive Ordnance Disposal (EOD) unit in Hawai'i. As his nickname suggested, he could be very angry to those crossed his line in workplace.

=== Carla Chase ===
Commander (Dr.) Carla Chase (portrayed by Seana Kofoed) is the medical examiner assigned to Joint Base Pearl Harbor–Hickam. Similar to other medical examiners in the NCIS universe, Clara also possessed great knowledge in toxicology and clinical medicine.

=== Daniel Tennant ===
Daniel Tennant (portrayed by Anthony Ruivivar) is Jane's ex-husband and father of her children. They have settled issues peacefully, with Jane encounter with his new partner normally and constantly discuss the children's future with him.

=== Neil Pike ===
Agent Neil Pike (portrayed by Mark Gessner) is a Coast Guard Investigative Service Agent. While he could be very serious in undercover and rescue missions, his comical actions make him great friends of Jesse and Kai.

=== John Swift ===
John Swift (portrayed by Henry Ian Cusick) is the NCIS Supervisory Special Agent in Charge, who temporarily took up Jane's leader role when she was subject to investigation. Though he acted cruel to any suspicion, there is a side that he appreciated people with dynamic personalities.

== Crossover characters ==
=== NCIS ===
- Wilmer Valderrama as Nick Torres: NCIS Special Agent who shares a past with Tennant.
- Katrina Law as Jessica Knight: NCIS Special Agent.
- Diona Reasonover as Kasie Hines: Forensic Specialist for NCIS.
- Gary Cole as Alden Parker: NCIS Supervisory Special Agent of the MCRT.
- Brian Dietzen as Dr. Jimmy Palmer, Chief Medical Examiner for NCIS.

=== NCIS: Los Angeles ===
- Chris O'Donnell as Grisha "G." Callen, NCIS Supervisory Special Agent of the Office of Special Projects in Los Angeles.
- LL Cool J as Sam Hanna, NCIS Senior Field Agent, Second in Command of the OSP. Sam becomes a recurring character in season 3, that he is first believed to be a surveillant towards Jane after the events of the season 2 finale, though there are more secrets behind his long presence in Hawai'i.
