= Shawn Roberts =

Canadian actor (born 1984)

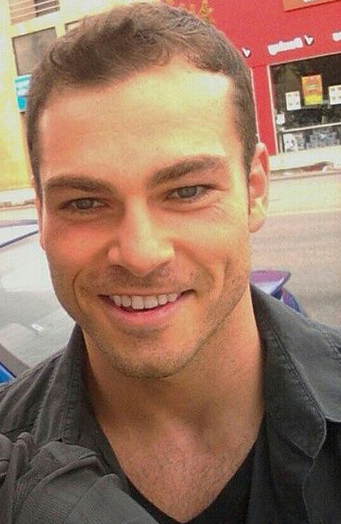
- Born: April 2, 1984 (age 42); Stratford, Ontario, Canada
- Occupation: Actor
- Years active: 1997–present
- Notable work: Resident Evil, Goosebumps

Shawn Roberts (born April 2, 1984) is a Canadian actor best known for his roles in zombie films such as Land of the Dead, Diary of the Dead and the Resident Evil franchise.

== Early life ==
Roberts was born in Stratford, Ontario. He has two older sisters.

== Career ==
Roberts started acting when he played the wolf in a school play of Little Red Riding Hood, which was seen by award-winning screenwriter Robert Forsythe. Forsythe, a friend of Roberts's father, helped him get a role in Emily of New Moon. Afterwards, he gained a role on Goosebumps as Brian O'Connor in the two-part episode, "The Perfect School." Roberts went on to play Dean Walton in the Canadian television series Degrassi: The Next Generation. He has also co-starred with Anna Paquin. His film works include George A. Romero's Land of the Dead and Diary of the Dead. In 2010, he appeared in Resident Evil: Afterlife, where he played villain Albert Wesker. He was considered for the male lead in the musical film Burlesque, starring Christina Aguilera and released in November 2010. He reprised the role of Wesker in two sequels, 2012 in Resident Evil: Retribution. and in 2016 in Resident Evil: The Final Chapter.

In 2020, he starred in a television movie Love Under the Olive Tree, portraying Adam Cauldfield—the lead character's gay best friend and her co-worker. He starred as Spartacus in the season 6 premiere of Legends of Tomorrow.

Known for his heavily muscular physique, his biggest influences in acting include action stars Arnold Schwarzenegger, Bruce Willis, and Sylvester Stallone. For his role in the comedy horror film Here for Blood (2022), where he played a professional wrestler, he underwent severe wrestling training.

== Filmography ==
=== Film ===
Year	Title	Role	Notes	Ref(s)
1999	Jacob Two Two Meets the Hooded Fang	Daniel		
1999	Sea People	Peter Warner		
2000	X-Men	David	Credited as "Rogue's Boyfriend"	
2001	Get Over It	Colin		
2002	We Were the Mulvaneys	Zachary Lundt		
2003	Fallen Angel	18-year-old Terry		
2003	Word of Honor	Young PFC. Sadowski		
2003	Detention	Corey Washington		
2003	Ghost Cat	Kurt		
2004	Taking Lives	Desk clerk		
2004	A Home at the End of the World	Club boy		
2004	Zeyda and the Hitman	Alpha boy		
2004	Going the Distance	Tyler		
2004	Siblings	Tom Muster		
2004	Mrs. Ashboro's Cat	Kurt		
2005	Jesse Stone: Stone Cold	Bo Marino		
2005	Thralls	Jim		
2005	Land of the Dead	Mike		
2005	Cheaper by the Dozen 2	Calvin Murtaugh		
2006	Skinwalkers	Adam Kilmer		
2006	Shock to the System	Larry Phelps		
2006	Man of the Year	Truck driver		
2007	Diary of the Dead	Tony Ravello		
2007	Left for Dead	Clark		
2007	Stir of Echoes: The Homecoming	Luke		
2007	It Was One of Us	George Watnick		
2008	Jumper	English bartender		
2009	I Love You, Beth Cooper	Kevin		
2009	Dark Skies,(AKA Black Rain)	Jack Webster		
2010	Edge of Darkness	David Burnham		
2010	Percy Jackson & the Olympians: The Lightning Thief	Camp demigod	Uncredited	
2010	Resident Evil: Afterlife	Albert Wesker		
2011	Devil's Night	Clark		
2011	Reel Love	Jay		
2012	The Music Teacher	Jace		
2012	Broken Trust	Eric Robinson		
2012	A Little Bit Zombie	Craig		
2012	Wyatt Earp's Revenge	Young Wyatt Earp		
2012	Resident Evil: Retribution	Albert Wesker		
2013	Her Husband's Betrayal	Riley Coulter	Television film	
2014	Recipe for Love	Dexter Durant	Television film	
2014	The Girl He Met Online	Andy Collins		
2014	Feed the Gods	Will Oates		
2015	I Do, I Do, I Do	Max Lorenzo		
2015	40 Below and Falling	Redford		
2016	Ms Matched	Ben		
2016	Resident Evil: The Final Chapter	Albert Wesker		
2017	XXX: Return of Xander Cage	Jonas		
2020	Tainted	Koso		
2020	Defining Moments	Jack		
2022	Two Minutes to Midnight	Schultz	pre-production	
2022	Here for Blood	Tom O'Bannon		
2023	Afterwards	Alex		
2024	Campton Manor	Teddy		

=== Television ===
Year	Title	Role	Notes
1997	Goosebumps	Brian O'Connor	Episodes: "The Perfect School: Part 1" and "The Perfect School: Part 2"
1998–2000	Emily of New Moon	Teddy Kent	23 episodes
1999	La Femme Nikita	Milan	Episode: "Imitation of Death"
1999	Real Kids, Real Adventures	Andrew Shearman	Episode: "Scout's Honor: The Stephanie Shearman Story"
1999	The Famous Jett Jackson	Alex	Episode: "Popularity"
1999	Animorphs	Skater Dude	Episodes: "Changes: Part 2" and "Changes: Part 3"
2000	Twice in a Lifetime	Young Buzzy Walsh	Episode: "Even Steven"
2002	Earth: Final Conflict	Jeremiah	Episode: "Atavus High"
2002–2004	Degrassi: The Next Generation	Dean Walton	5 episodes
2003	Starhunter	Skinny	Episode: "Rebirth"
2004	Wild Card	Josh Dickens	Episode: "Candy Land"
2006	Falcon Beach	Hurst	7 episodes
2007	The Virgin of Akron, Ohio	Owen	Episode: "Pilot"
2007	Flash Gordon	Garus	Episodes: "Ascension" and "Secrets and Lies"
2009	Wild Roses	Foster	4 episodes
2009	Psych	Billy	Episode: "Tuesday the 17th"
2009	Supernatural	Austin	Episode: "Good God, Y'All"
2009	Flashpoint	Darren Kovacs	Episode: "Behind the Blue Line"
2011	Being Erica	Milo	Episode: "Erica's Adventures in Wonderland"
2012	The Firm	Tom Connelly	Episode: "Chapter Five"
2012	The Listener	Tyler Ross	Episode: "Lockdown"
2013	Cracked	Johnny Francos	Episode: "Hideaway"
2016	Ms Matched	Ben Reynolds	Hallmark Movie
2017	Designated Survivor	Grady Banks	Episode: "Party Line"
2017	Undercover Angel	Henry	Hallmark Movie
2019–2023	Heartland	Sam Langston	11 episodes
2020	Love Under the Olive Tree	Adam Cauldfield	Hallmark movie
2021	Legends of Tomorrow	Spartacus	Episode: "Ground Control to Sara Lance"
2022	Murdoch Mysteries	Simon	Episode: "It's a Wonderful Game"

== Awards and nominations ==
Year	Event	Award/category	Work	Result	Ref.
2012	Canada International Film Festival	Rising Star Award (shared with Crystal Lowe and Kristopher Turner, among others)	A Little Bit Zombie	Won	
2017	Culture Beat Awards	Most Attractive Canadian Actor	—N/a	Won	
2023	Kodaikanal International Film Festival	Best Supporting Actor	Afterwards	Won	
