= Mary and Flo On the Go! =

Canadian animated web series

Mary and Flo On the Go! is a Canadian animated web series, which premiered in 2022. A spinoff of Frankie Drake Mysteries, the show features animated versions of that show's supporting characters Mary Shaw (Rebecca Liddiard) and Flo Chakowitz (Sharron Matthews) travelling around the world meeting famous men and women from the era.

Supporting and guest actors in the cast include Julie Lemieux, Raoul Bhaneja, Annick Obonsawin, Jann Arden, Tiffany Ayalik, Rosey Grimes, Deven Christian Mack, Alex Côté and Jonathan Tan.

The series premiered March 4, 2022, on Shaftesbury Films' kids platform on YouTube.

The series received a Canadian Screen Award nomination for Best Original Digital Program or Series, Fiction at the 11th Canadian Screen Awards in 2023.
