= Mark Kingwell =

Canadian philosopher (born 1963)

Mark Kingwell FRSC
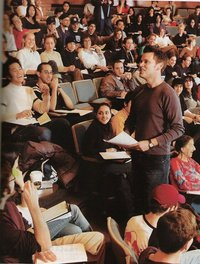
- Born: Mark Gerald Kingwell; March 1, 1963 (age 63); Toronto, Ontario, Canada
- Spouses: Gail Donaldson (m. 1988; div. 2004) Molly Montgomery (m. 2008)
- Relatives: Dylan Kingwell (nephew)

Education
- Education: University of Toronto; University of Edinburgh; Yale University

Philosophical work
- Era: 20th / 21st-century philosophy
- Region: Western Philosophy
- School: Social philosophy Aesthetics
- Main interests: Political philosophy Cultural criticism Philosophy of art Continental philosophy

Mark Gerald Kingwell FRSC (born March 1, 1963) is a Canadian philosopher, professor and former associate chair at the University of Toronto's Department of Philosophy. Kingwell is a fellow of Trinity College. He specialises in theories of politics and culture. He writes widely in both scholarly and mainstream venues, and addresses specific topics in social justice, discourse ethics, aesthetics, film theory, philosophy of architecture and urbanism, philosophy of technology, and cultural theory.

== Early life and education ==
Kingwell was born in Toronto but grew up on air force bases across Canada, including the Maritimes and Manitoba, where he graduated from St. Paul's High School in Winnipeg in 1980. He studied philosophy, English, and political science at the University of Toronto, editing The Varsity through 1983 to 1984 and the University of Toronto Review in 1984-85. He received his BA degree from St. Michael's College with High Distinction in 1985; his MLitt degree from the University of Edinburgh in 1987 supervised by R. W. Hepburn; and both his MPhil and PhD degrees from Yale University in 1989 and 1991 respectively.

His doctoral supervisors were Georgia Warnke (Philosophy) and Bruce Ackerman (Law and Political Science); at Yale he also studied with Karsten Harries, G. R. F. Ferrari, Jonathan Lear, Maurice Natanson, and Ruth Barcan Marcus. He was awarded SSHRC doctoral (1988) and post-doctoral (1991) fellowships. During this period (1985-1991) he worked as both a general assignment reporter and editorial writer at the Globe and Mail and a course instructor in Yale College.

== Career ==
Kingwell joined the University of Toronto Department of Philosophy as an assistant professor in 1993 after teaching at York University in Toronto during his postdoctoral fellowship. He was promoted to associate professor with tenure in 1998 then to full professor in 2002. He has served as both Associate Chair (Undergraduate) and Associate Chair (Graduate), as well as Placement Director in the department. From 2013 to 2019 he served on the Board of Trustees of Trinity College. He has been a board member for the Power Plant Contemporary Art Gallery in Toronto, Amnesty International Canada, The Walrus Foundation, and Continuum Contemporary Music, among others; he currently serves on the PEN Canada Advisory Council.

He has held visiting posts at institutions including: Clare Hall, University of Cambridge, where he is a Life Member; University of California at Berkeley Center for the Study of Law and Society; the University of Chicago's Neubauer Collegium; Stockholm University Faculty of Law; Faculdade de Arquitetura e Urbanismo, Escola da Cidade, São Paulo, Brazil; and Baruch College, City University of New York, where he held the title of Weissman Distinguished Professor of Humanities. From 2001 to 2004, he was chair of the Institute for Contemporary Culture at the Royal Ontario Museum. He has been awarded the University of Toronto President's Teaching Award and the Faculty of Arts & Science Outstanding Teaching Award, as well as a Faculty Research Fellowship at the Jackman Humanities Institute. In 2000 Kingwell received an honorary Doctor of Fine Arts degree from the Nova Scotia College of Art and Design, for contributions to theory and criticism. In 2018 he was named a fellow of the Royal Society of Canada.

== Writing ==
Kingwell has published more than two dozen books since 1995. Most notable are: A Civil Tongue: Justice, Dialogue, and the Politics of Pluralism, which was awarded the Spitz Prize for political theory in 1997; Dreams of Millennium: Report from a Culture on the Brink, which was a Maclean's magazine Top Ten Book for 1996 and finalist for the Gordon Montador Prize for social commentary; In Pursuit of Happiness: Better Living from Plato to Prozac, a cultural and philosophical critique of happiness that was a Globe and Mail, Los Angeles Times, and Baltimore City Paper Top Ten book in 1998, also a finalist for the Gordon Montador Prize; and Concrete Reveries: Consciousness and the City, which was a finalist for both the Writers Trust and British Columbia Non-Fiction Prizes in 2008. His book about the Empire State Building, Nearest Thing to Heaven, was a Globe and Mail Notable Book in 2006.

Other writing honours include the 2020 Erving Goffman Book Prize for Wish I Were Here: Boredom and the Interface, a Humanist of the Year award in 2010, and National Magazine Awards for both Essays and Columns out of six total nominations. Alain Roy's French translation of Kingwell's book on Glenn Gould was awarded the Governor-General's Literary Award in 2012, and his essays have appeared in the annual Best Canadian Essays anthology four times.

Kingwell is a contributing editor to Harper's Magazine, the now-suspended literary quarterly Descant, the political monthly This Magazine, and The Globe and Mail's books section. He was also a drinks columnist for the men's magazine Toro. He was formerly a political columnist for Adbusters and the National Post, and a contributing editor and television columnist for Saturday Night. He now writes regularly for the Globe and Mail and Toronto Star Opinion sections and the online magazine HiLoBrow.

Kingwell's work has been translated into nine languages. His work on philosophy, art, and architecture has appeared in many leading academic journals and magazines, including The Journal of Philosophy, The Philosophical Forum, Ethics, Political Theory, Yale Journal of Law and the Humanities, Wilson Quarterly, American Scholar, Canadian Journal of Political Philosophy, The New York Times and The New York Times Magazine, Utne Reader, Adbusters, The Walrus, Harvard Design Magazine, LA+, Border Crossings, Literary Review of Canada, Canadian Art, Azure, Gray's Sporting Journal, Toronto Life, the Toronto Star, The Globe and Mail, and the National Post.

In addition to public writing, Kingwell frequently appears on television and radio as well as on cultural and political podcasts, and is known for his appearance in the documentary film The Corporation. He has lectured to academic and popular audiences around the world, and has delivered, among others, the George Grant, Harold Innis, Munro Beattie, William Morris, Marx Wartofsky, Norman Kretzmann, and Larkin-Stuart memorial lectures. He was invited to give the 2024 Vincent Massey Memorial Lectures but withdrew after disagreements with CBC producers.

== Personal life ==
Kingwell describes himself as a social democrat and a "recovering Catholic." According to the Canadian Who's Who, he enjoys baseball, football, fly fishing, cricket, films, art collecting, and jazz, classical and pop music. He has two brothers: Sean and Steven. He was married to Gail Donaldson in 1988; the marriage ended in divorce in 2004. He married Molly Montgomery in 2008, and has two stepdaughters, Chloe and Clara. His nephew, Dylan Kingwell, is an actor. In 2023, he described his struggles with alcohol, which culminated in the need for two liver transplant surgeries.

== Publications ==
- A Civil Tongue: Justice, Dialogue, and the Politics of Pluralism, Pennsylvania State University Press, 1995, ISBN 0-271-01334-6 (hardcover), ISBN 0-271-01335-4 (paperback).
- Dreams of Millennium: Report from a Culture on the Brink, Penguin Canada, 1996; Faber & Faber, 1997, ISBN 0-571-19902-X
- Marginalia: A Cultural Reader, Penguin Canada, 1999, ISBN 978-0-14-028699-1
- In Pursuit of Happiness: Better Living from Plato to Prozac, Viking, 1998; Crown Publishing Group (NY), 2000, ISBN 0-609-60535-6
- Canada: Our Century: 100 Voices, 500 Visions, (co-authored with Christopher Moore), Doubleday Canada, 2000, ISBN 978-0385-25893-7
- The World We Want: Restoring Citizenship in a Fractured Age, Viking, 2000; Rowman & Littlefield, 2001, ISBN 0-7425-1258-4, ISBN 0-7425-1266-5.
- Practical Judgments: Essays in Culture, Politics, and Interpretation, University of Toronto Press, 2002, ISBN 0-8020-3675-9 (hardcover), ISBN 0-8020-3801-8 (paperback)
- Catch and Release: Trout Fishing and the Meaning of Life, Viking, 2003, ISBN 0-14-301565-6
- Nothing for Granted: Tales of War, Philosophy, and Why the Right Was Mostly Wrong: Selected Writings 2000-2003, Penguin Canada, 2005, ISBN 0-14-305193-8
- Nearest Thing to Heaven: The Empire State Building and American Dreams, Yale University Press, 2006, ISBN 978-0-300-10622-0
- Classic Cocktails: A Modern Shake, McClelland & Stewart, 2006, ISBN 0-7710-9558-9, ISBN 978-0-7710-9558-0
- Concrete Reveries: Consciousness and the City, Viking, 2008, ISBN 0-670-04326-5, ISBN 978-0-670-04326-2
- The Idler's Glossary, (co-authored with Joshua Glenn; illustrated by Seth), Biblioasis, 2008, ISBN 978-1-897231-46-3
- Opening Gambits: Essays on Art and Philosophy, Key Porter Books, 2008, ISBN 978-1-55470-073-8
- Glenn Gould, Viking, 2009, ISBN 978-0-670-06850-0
- Rites of Way: The Politics and Poetics of Public Space, (co-edited with Patrick Turmel), Wilfrid Laurier University Press, 2009, ISBN 978-1-55458-153-5
- The Wage Slave's Glossary, (co-authored with Joshua Glenn; illustrated by Seth), Biblioasis, 2011, ISBN 978-1-926845-17-3
- Unruly Voices: Essays on Democracy, Civility and the Human Imagination, Biblioasis, 2012, ISBN 978-1-926845-84-5
- Measure Yourself Against the Earth: Essays, Biblioasis, 2015, ISBN 978-1-771960-46-5
- Fail Better: Why Baseball Matters, Biblioasis, 2017, ISBN 978-1-77196-153-0
- Nach der Arbeit, Nicolai Verlag, 2018, ISBN 978-3-964760-06-7
- Wish I Were Here: Boredom and the Interface, McGill-Queen's University Press, 2019, ISBN 978-0-773557-12-3
- On Risk, Biblioasis, 2020, ISBN 978-1-771963-92-3
- The Adventurer's Glossary, (co-authored with Joshua Glenn; illustrated by Seth), McGill-Queen's University Press, 2021, ISBN 978-0-228008-31-6
- The Ethics of Architecture (Ethics in Context), Oxford University Press, 2021, ISBN 978-0-197558-54-6
- Singular Creatures: Robots, Rights, and the Politics of Posthumanism, McGill-Queen's University Press, 2022, ISBN 978-0-228014-34-8
- Question Authority: A Polemic About Trust in Five Meditations, Biblioasis, 2024, ISBN 978-1-771966-41-2
