= MsLabelled =

- Genre: Comedy-drama
- Starring: Jeanne Beker; Rebecca Liddiard; Spencer Robson; Sara Hennessey; Marni Van Dyk; Tori Anderson; Shawn Ahmed; Sydney Kondruss; Nykeem Provo; Richard Young; Kim Roberts
- Country of origin: Canada
- Original language: English
- No. of seasons: 2

Original release
- Network: KindaTV
- Release: March 24, 2015 – present

MsLabelled is a 2015 webseries produced by Smokebomb Entertainment and Shift2, sponsored by Schick (season one) and Tetley (season two). The series, in addition to running on YouTube for two seasons, will air on Slice. The series stars Rebecca Liddiard, Spencer Robson, Sara Hennessey, Marni van Dyk, Tori Anderson, Shawn Ahmed, Sydney Kondruss, Nykeen Provo, Richard Young and Kim Roberts, and features fashion personality Jeanne Beker.
