= Love Under the Olive Tree =

2020 Canadian television film directed by Peter DeLuise

- Film poster
- Written by: Samantha Herman
- Directed by: Peter DeLuise
- Starring: Tori Anderson; Benjamin Hollingsworth; Shawn Roberts
- Music by: Mikel Hurwitz
- Country of origin: Canada
- Original language: English

Production
- Producer: Amar Balaggan
- Cinematography: Thomas M. Harting
- Editor: Mark Shearer
- Running time: 82 minutes
- Production companies: Bar None Productions; Vector Film Services

Original release
- Network: Hallmark Channel
- Release: June 20, 2020

Love Under the Olive Tree is a Canadian television film directed by Peter DeLuise and written by Samantha Herman, with a story by Jenna Milly and Ann Marie Allison. The cast includes Tori Anderson, Benjamin Hollingsworth, and Shawn Roberts. It premiered on the Hallmark Channel on June 20, 2020.

== Plot ==
A conflict arises between two local olive oil ranches. Nicole Cabella is determined to prove the opponent Jake Brandini her family's recipe is award-worthy. But what if these two fall in love?.

== Cast ==
- Tori Anderson as Nicole Cabella
- Benjamin Hollingsworth as Jake Brandini
- Shawn Roberts as Adam Caulfield
- Gardiner Millar as Frank Cabella
- Hrothgar Mathews as Tom Cabella
- Andrew Dunbar as Billy Stevens
- Laura Drummond as Gloria Cabella
- Jerry Wasserman as Raphael Brandini
- Barry W. Levy as Maxwel Brandini (credited as Barry Levy)
- Robyn Bradley as Eleanor Brandini

== Production ==
The movie was shot in British Columbia, Canada, in July and August 2019. One specific location was the Milsean Shoppe in Aldergrove, BC. It was originally scheduled to be released in September 2019 but the premiere was postponed. Love Under the Olive Tree explores two evolving relationships: one that is heterosexual, and the other one between a same-sex couple (Shawn Roberts and Andrew Dunbar). Roberts portrays Adam Caulfield, the lead character's gay best friend and her co-worker. According to the actor, the gay subplot was handled in the script in "the most natural and authentic way". Roberts went on to say: "I'd never seen that in any other scripts before. It wasn’t a comment one way or another about anything, or what kind of relationships are out there, and without shining a light on things, just have something open and accepting."

== Critical reception ==
In a journal for Fangirl, Interrupted the two lead characters were named "the Montagues and Capulets of the olive oil world", and the movie itself was praised for its inclusion of the LGBT characters. A review for The Best Darn Girls was mostly favorable: "While the conclusion is anticlimactic, the love story still has promise." Albert Nowicki of We'll Always Have the Movies praised the movie for its "charming setting" and "the natural portrayal of a queer relationship". He also believed Roberts' character was a positive gay role model and went on to describe him as a "Bruce Willis type of a man", "with a musculature of a Superman".
