= Rob Walker (journalist) =

American journalist and author

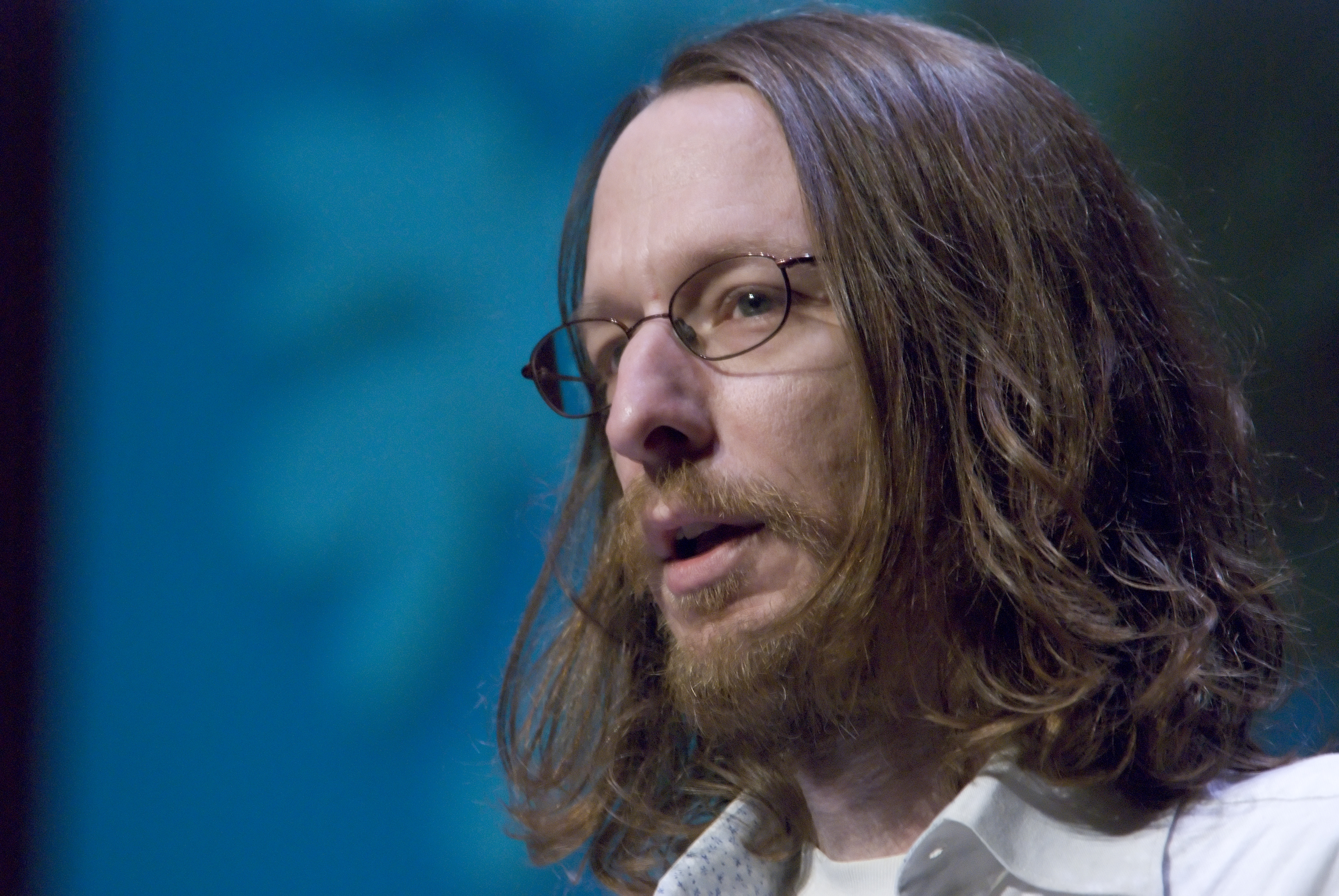
- Walker in 2010
- Born: 1968 (age 57–58); Houston, Texas, U.S.
- Occupations: Author; journalist; educator
- Writing career
- Genre: Non-fiction
- Notable works: The Art of Noticing; Buying In; Letters from New Orleans

Rob Walker (born 1968) is an American journalist, author and educator, whose primary interests include design, business, technology, consumer culture, and the arts.

He is the author of The Art of Noticing (2019), Buying In: The Secret Dialogue Between What We Buy and Who We Are (2008), and co-author, with Joshua Glenn, of Significant Objects: 100 Extraordinary Stories About Ordinary Things (2012). He writes a regular column in Fast Company magazine and has written for Design Observer, Bloomberg Businessweek, and The Atlantic. From 2013 until 2018, he wrote "The Workologist" column in The New York Times, and between 2004 and 2012 was a contributing writer for The New York Times Magazine, for which he wrote the "Consumed" column. He serves on the faculty of the Products of Design MFA program at the School of Visual Arts in New York City.

== Career ==
Walker has written for and worked as an editor at publications such as The New York Times, The New York Times Magazine, Slate, Money, The Atlantic, Design Observer, and The American Lawyer.

in 2019, Walker published The Art of Noticing, a book about distraction, attention, and finding inspiration, with Knopf. As an addendum to the book, he publishes a biweekly email newsletter about "creativity, work, and staying human."

In 2008, Walker published a book exploring themes similar to those in his "Consumed" columns called Buying In: The Secret Dialogue Between What We Buy and Who We Are. It was reviewed favorably and received much attention for its discussion of the term "murketing", which Walker had coined.

Walker's 2005 book, Letters From New Orleans, was compiled from essays emailed "to interested parties" about life in New Orleans, where he lived in the early 2000s. All author proceeds from Letters from New Orleans went to relief organizations such as the Red Cross and others working with victims of Hurricane Katrina.

Walker has written a number of comic book stories published under the name R. Walker. A collection of his satirical stories of the business world was published in 2001 together with artist Josh Neufeld, as Titans of Finance: True Tales of Money & Business.

=== Projects ===
Walker has participated in or led a number of artistic projects including the Hypothetical Development Organization (together with Ellen Susan and GK Darby), which explored renderings of purely hypothetical possibilities for blighted buildings in New Orleans, and was part of the official U.S. presentation at the 2012 Venice Architecture Biennale. He also started the Unconsumption Project, which tracks mindful consumption and creative reuse, and the MLK Blvd open source journalism project, which looks at the streets sharing that name all over the word.

The Significant Objects project, where writers are paired with an interesting object curated by Walker and co-founder Joshua Glenn, about which they write a fictional story, later to be sold on eBay. A book compiling 100 of these stories was published by Fantagraphics Books in 2012.

In 2015, Walker published an interview with George Ruban, a Wikipedia editor. The interview covered Wikipedia-related issues such as Wikipedia's concept of notability, accuracy of Wikipedia articles, personal privacy of the subjects of Wikipedia articles, and the merits of including photographs in the biographies of living persons.

== Personal life ==
Walker is a 1990 graduate of the University of Texas at Austin, and is married to photographer and designer Ellen Susan.

== Publications ==
- The Art of Noticing: 131 Ways to Spark Creativity, Find Inspiration, and Discover Joy in the Everyday (Knopf, May 7, 2019) ISBN 978-0525521242
- Significant Objects: 100 Extraordinary Stories About Ordinary Things, edited, with Joshua Glenn (Fantagraphics Books, August 6, 2012) ISBN 978-1606995259
- Buying In: The Secret Dialogue Between What We Buy and Who We Are (Random House, June 2008) ISBN 1-4000-6391-4
- Where Were You? (self-published zine, 2007–present)
- Letters From New Orleans (Garrett County Press, 2005) ISBN 1-891053-01-9
- Titans of Finance: True Tales of Money & Business (with artist Josh Neufeld) (Alternative Comics, 2001) ISBN 978-1-891867-05-7
