= Murketing =

Murketing is an advertising strategy that avoids direct sales of a product and focuses instead on vagaries such as marketing buzz, brand identity and publicity.

== Examples ==
Well known examples of murketing include the launch of Red Bull, which spent millions of dollars promoting stealth events and competitions that had little to do with their actual product. Pabst Blue Ribbon similarly attempted to cultivate an apathetic image by deliberately not trying to sell or brand their product, knowing that doing so would have alienated their brand-weary potential customers. The use of viral videos, often unattributed or only indirectly attributed to a brand or company, is also considered a "murketing" technique.

== Usage and etymology ==
The word murketing, a portmanteau of "murky" and "marketing," was coined by author Rob Walker. He also often named it murketing as "The Marketing of No Marketing." Murketing first appeared in the work, Walker's 2008 book Buying In: The Secret Dialogue Between What We Buy and Who We Are. He claims to have come up with the word while on assignment for Outside Magazine in Cuba in order to describe the "murky marketing" displayed by Red Bull’s sponsorship of a kyteboarding contest. The word is now used in marketing and advertising circles as well as with media critics who use the term to point out deceptive marketing tactics. Traditionally, a company that spots a sudden market opportunity responds by gearing ads toward the new customers.
