= Frankie Drake Mysteries =

Canadian television series (2017–2021)

- Genre: Crime; Mystery; Period drama; Noir
- Created by: Carol Hay; Michelle Ricci
- Starring: Lauren Lee Smith; Chantel Riley; Rebecca Liddiard; Sharron Matthews
- Country of origin: Canada
- No. of seasons: 4
- No. of episodes: 41

Production
- Production locations: Toronto, Ontario; London, England
- Running time: 43 minutes
- Production companies: Shaftesbury Films; UKTV

Original release
- Network: CBC Television
- Release: November 6, 2017 – March 8, 2021

Related
- Mary and Flo On the Go!

Frankie Drake Mysteries is a Canadian drama that ran on CBC Television from November 6, 2017 to March 8, 2021. The series stars Lauren Lee Smith and Chantel Riley as Frankie Drake and her partner Trudy Clarke who run an all-female private detective service in Toronto in the 1920s.

== Overview ==
Lauren Lee Smith portrays the fictional Frankie Drake, the first female private detective in 1920s Toronto, with Chantel Riley as her crime solving partner Trudy Clarke. Frankie and Trudy are often assisted on their cases by Mary Shaw (Rebecca Liddiard), a morality officer in Toronto's police force, and Flo Chakowitz (Sharron Matthews), a morgue attendant at the Toronto City Morgue.

== Cast and characters ==
=== Main ===
- Lauren Lee Smith as Frankie Drake, Toronto's first female private detective and the owner of Drake Private Detectives
- Chantel Riley as Trudy Clarke, Frankie's partner and friend
- Rebecca Liddiard as Mary Shaw, a morality officer in Toronto's police force who often helps Frankie with her cases
- Sharron Matthews as Flo Chakowitz, a morgue attendant at the Toronto City Morgue who provides information to Frankie

=== Recurring ===
- Wendy Crewson as Nora Amory, Frankie's mother, a con artist
- Karen Robinson (seasons 1–3; guest season 4) as Mildred Clarke, Trudy's mother, a good Christian woman who is not afraid to speak her mind when needed
- Grace Lynn Kung (seasons 1–3) as Wendy Quon, the owner of Quon's Cafe, a speakeasy in the Ward that is frequented by the main cast
- Romaine Waite as Bill Peters, a friend of Trudy's who works at city hall and helps the women out with information at times. At the beginning of season four, was engaged to Trudy. He had a job offer in Ottawa, which caused Trudy to break off the engagement
- Emmanuel Kabongo as Moses Page (seasons 1 & 3), Frankie's boxing instructor with whom she has a casual romantic relationship
- Steve Lund as Ernest Hemingway (season 1), a writer and reporter for the Toronto Star
- Richard Walters (seasons 1–3) as Tickles Malone, a musician who Frankie bumps into at different clubs around Toronto
- Anthony Lemke as Detective Grayson (season 2), recently transferred to the Toronto police and a thorn in Frankie's investigations
- Johnathan Sousa as Alessandro Contento (season 4), a European race car driver who is Frankie's boyfriend
- Ben Sanders as Steven Reid (season 4), a journalist for the Worker's Gazette and Mary's boyfriend
- Patrick Garrow as Harvey Lyle (season 4), a detective in Mary's precinct, who suspects Mary is smarter than she lets on and tries to catch her snooping
- Mac Fyfe as Sebastian West (season 4), Frankie's neighbour, a carpenter, who has a passing interest in Frankie

=== Guest ===
- Jonny Harris as George Crabtree (season 1), who has retired from the Toronto police and was a successful investor
- Derek McGrath as Abraham Amory (season 1)
- Romane Portail as Coco Chanel (season 2), who hires Frankie to determine who shot at her in Toronto
- Honeysuckle Weeks as Agatha Christie (season 3), whom Frankie meets in England
- Dillon Casey as Jack Drake (seasons 3 & 4), Frankie's younger half brother
- Geraint Wyn Davies as Ned Drake (season 4), Frankie's dead father, who she discovers is alive and well
- Amalia Williamson as Lena

== Episodes ==
=== Series overview ===
Season	Episodes	Originally released	
Season	Episodes	First released	Last released
1	11	November 6, 2017	February 5, 2018
2	10	September 24, 2018	November 26, 2018
3	10	September 16, 2019	December 2, 2019
4	10	January 4, 2021	March 8, 2021

=== Season 1 (2017–2018) ===
No. overall	No. in season	Title	Directed by	Written by	Original release date
1	1	"Mother of Pearl"	Ruba Nadda	Michelle Ricci	November 6, 2017
Frankie partners with a surprising ally when she's named as the number one suspect in a robbery that looks like the work of her dead father.
2	2	"Ladies in Red"	Ruba Nadda	Cal Coons	November 13, 2017
Frankie and Trudy are hired by a factory owner to root out communists working for him, but things are not as they appear.
3	3	"Summer in the City"	Norma Bailey	Carol Hay	November 20, 2017
When a dead body turns up in the luggage of a young man, the case brings Frankie and Trudy into Toronto's elite social circles.
4	4	"Healing Hands"	Sudz Sutherland	Andrew Burrows-Trotman	November 27, 2017
When Trudy gives shelter to a faith-healing preacher's daughter, she and Frankie find themselves investigating Toronto's Jazz scene.
5	5	"Out of Focus"	Sudz Sutherland	John Callaghan	December 4, 2017
Frankie and Trudy go undercover in the glamorous world of film in order to solve a seemingly impossible murder on a silent movie set.
6	6	"Whisper Sisters"	Leslie Hope	Adriana Maggs	December 11, 2017
After a shooting injures the young son of a friend, Frankie and Trudy's investigation leads them into the dangerous world of bootlegging.
7	7	"Ties That Bind"	Eleanor Lindo	Carol Hay	January 8, 2018
Mary recruits Frankie and Trudy to find a missing teacher, but their investigation leads them to family secrets, Chinatown and murder.
8	8	"The Pilot"	Leslie Hope (as Alanis Smithee)	Carol Hay	January 15, 2018
A day off turns into a day at the office for Frankie and Trudy when the infant son of a charismatic aviator is kidnapped during an air show.
9	9	"Ghosts"	Peter Stebbings	Ian Carpenter	January 22, 2018
The horrors of war haunt Frankie when an investigation into a soldier's murder reunites her with a friend left traumatised by his tour of duty.
10	10	"Anastasia"	Cal Coons	Michelle Ricci	January 29, 2018
Frankie is hired to confirm the identity of a young woman claiming to be the Grand Duchess Anastasia Nikolaevna of Russia and protect her from those who want her dead.
11	11	"Once Burnt Twice Spied"	Peter Stebbings	Michelle Ricci	February 5, 2018
When Frankie gets a mysterious call from a British spy, Mary discovers how she and Trudy met, and how Drake Private Detectives was formed.

=== Season 2 (2018) ===
No. overall	No. in season	Title	Directed by	Written by	Original release date
12	1	"The Old Switcheroo"	Ruba Nadda	Carol Hay	September 24, 2018
Nora has a legitimate job at the Toronto Museum, where an old enemy of Frankie's tries to pull a con job and almost pulls a con on Nora herself. In the end, Frankie goes to the United States to meet up a famous archeologist to get some information. Meanwhile, Flo and Mary unite to find out the truth about a mysterious man involved in a seemingly straight-up death.
13	2	"Last Dance"	Ruba Nadda	James Hurst	October 1, 2018
A case of mistaken identity has a diabetic man kidnapped during a dance marathon. Frankie meets Detective Grayson for the first time. The accidental kidnapped victim is diabetic and is on a ticking clock to get a newly invented medication called insulin.
14	3	"Radio Daze"	Cal Coons	Ruba Nadda	October 8, 2018
A producer of a local radio station tries to use a radio play as a cover to pull a bank job, but Mary figures it out and tries to warn Frankie.
15	4	"Emancipation Day"	Ruba Nadda	Andrew Burrows-Trotman	October 15, 2018
Marcus Garvey is in town to lend his support to a fundraiser for a black girls' orphanage and offers a Trudy a job in Chicago. Flo and Mary take a trip to a Rochester, NY police station, where they encounter a female police officer.
16	5	"Dressed to Kill"	Sudz Sutherland	Jessie Gabe	October 22, 2018
Coco Chanel hires Frankie, while visiting Toronto, when someone tries to shoot her when the police did not take it seriously. A local gossip columnist in the Toronto Star called Lipstick writes about the goings-on happening before Coco's fashion show. Lipstick is revealed to be Nora.
17	6	"Extra Innings"	Sudz Sutherland	John Callaghan	October 29, 2018
A female baseball player is killed while playing, who Frankie finds out that was being paid to throw the game. Mary joins the team to help solve the murder, while Frankie meets Bessie Starkman, who is a racketeer.
18	7	"50 Shades of Greyson"	Cal Coons	Jessie Gabe	November 5, 2018
Mary suspects Detective Greyson of hiding evidence and decides to spy on him on her own, only to get caught by Greyson himself and fired instead. It is revealed that the case is familiar to Greyson because it is similar to one at his old precinct. They discover that one of the killers is someone from Mary's past.
19	8	"Diamonds are a Gal's Best Friend"	Peter Stebbings	Carol Hay	November 12, 2018
A famous diamond is stolen and Frankie and Trudy take the case with some help from Nora.
20	9	"Dealer's Choice"	Ruba Nadda	John Callaghan	November 19, 2018
Frankie and Trudy agree to help a young man retrieve his pocket watch, which has sentimental value. Their search takes them to Bessie Starkman's casino, who is not happy to see Frankie, but admits her casino has been robbed at gunpoint a few times. The two women agree to help each other out.
21	10	"Now You See Her"	Ruba Nadda	James Hurst	November 26, 2018
Frankie goes undercover as a magician's assistant when his first assistant dies in a magic act gone wrong.

=== Season 3 (2019) ===
No. overall	No. in season	Title	Directed by	Written by	Original release date
22	1	"No Friends Like Old Friends"	Ruba Nadda	Carol Hay	September 16, 2019
Agatha Christie helps Frankie solve the disappearance and poisoning of an old friend of hers from the war, while Frankie is visiting in England. Trudy and the gang help Frankie out at home, while dealing with leaky plumbing.
23	2	"CounterPunch"	Mina Shum	John Callaghan and Keri Ferencz	September 23, 2019
Frankie steps into the boxing ring to stop illegal boxing and meets up with her old friend Moses Page.
24	3	"School Ties, School Lies"	Ruba Nadda	Jennifer Kassabian	September 30, 2019
A favourite teacher at a private school is killed and Frankie is hired to find the killer.
25	4	"A Brother in Arms"	Mina Shum	Karen Hill and Ley Lukins	October 7, 2019
Frankie discovers her long lost half brother, who asks her help in exonerating a condemned friend.
26	5	"Things Better Left Dead"	Ruba Nadda	Cal Coons	October 14, 2019
Frankie investigates a murder involving a medium she suspects to be a con artist.
27	6	"Life on the Line"	Stephen Reizes	Keri Ferencz	October 28, 2019
Finding a man ready to throw himself off a bridge, Frankie investigates who is trying to ruin his life.
28	7	"Out on a Limb"	Ruba Nadda	Carol Hay	November 4, 2019
Frankie investigates the murder of a flapper club dancer.
29	8	"Ward of the Roses"	Stephen Reizes	Andrew Burrows-Trotman	November 11, 2019
When a friend of Trudy's is running for office, she and Frankie try to figure out who's attempting to wreck her campaign.
30	9	"A History of Violins"	Cal Coons	John Callaghan	November 25, 2019
When a famous violinist has her instrument stolen in the middle of a concert, Frankie is called in to look for it.
31	10	"A Sunshine State of Mind"	Ruba Nadda	Jennifer Kassabian & Keri Ferencz	December 2, 2019
As a heatwave washes over the city, the ladies help track a con man who bilked Nora and Mildred.

=== Season 4 (2021) ===
No. overall	No. in season	Title	Directed by	Written by	Original release date
32	1	"Scavenger Hunt"	Eleanore Lindo	Mary Pedersen	January 4, 2021
The gals attend an outdoor scavenger hunt to celebrate Trudy's engagement, but find themselves investigating a murder when one player is killed.
33	2	"Prince in Exile"	Eleanore Lindo	Peter Mitchell	January 11, 2021
When a prince is kidnapped in Toronto, Frankie and the team are hired to discreetly find to him to avoid an international incident.
34	3	"The Girls Can't Help It"	Gary Harvey	Mary Pederson	January 18, 2021
A priceless bottle of wine is stolen, leading Frankie and Trudy to investigate a trio of flappers, infamous for their wild lifestyles.
35	4	"A Most Foiled Assault"	Gary Harvey	Jennifer Kassabian	January 25, 2021
The gals are hired to discover who is responsible for the murders at a female fencing trial of Olympic hopefuls.
36	5	"Ghost in the Machine"	R.T. Thorne	Keri Ferencz	February 1, 2021
While staying at Frankie's office, Nora is convinced she was visited by the ghost of a murdered woman. Persuaded to search the building, Frankie and Trudy are led to a shocking discovery.
37	6	"The Guilty Party"	R.T. Thorne	Carol Hay	February 8, 2021
The team investigates whether a man acquitted of a grisly murder is indeed innocent or guilty.
38	7	"Life is a Cabaret"	Bosede Williams	Keri Ferencz & Sharron Matthews	February 15, 2021
After witnessing a man's murder, Frankie's search for his lady-friend suspect leads her to an underground cabaret and surprising results.
39	8	"Sweet Justice"	Bosede Williams	Jennifer Kassabian & Robina Lord-Stafford	February 22, 2021
When Trudy discovers that her new dream home has contaminated water, the gals investigate the source with help from nighttime vigilante, Lady Justice.
40	9	"Showstoppers"	Peter Stebbings	Peter Mitchell & Rebecca Liddiard	March 1, 2021
Mary looks into a morality violation by Rita Hart's modern dance troupe, but as a sudden illness begins striking down the members of the troupe, Frankie questions if they've brought the Spanish Flu to Toronto.
41	10	"A Family Affair"	Harvey Crossland	Jennifer Kassabian & Keri Ferencz	March 8, 2021
Frankie's father reappears in her life, alive but in danger, with both Nora and Jack determined to be involved in Ned Drake's scheme. Mary risks her chances at becoming an official police officer by going on record to speak up against corruption in the police force, while Flo confronts her sister to protect her niece. Meanwhile, Trudy accepts a job at an insurance company only to discover her new employers are far more unscrupulous and dangerous than she realizes.

== Production ==
The series was created by Carol Hay and Michelle Ricci; both women also served as writers and producers on Murdoch Mysteries. It is produced by Shaftesbury Films.

On April 5, 2018, the show was renewed for a second season. On March 25, 2019, the show was renewed for a third season. The third-season premiere was filmed in England, with Honeysuckle Weeks playing the role of British author Agatha Christie. On May 27, 2020, Frankie Drake Mysteries was renewed by CBC for a fourth season. On February 28, 2021, CBC announced the show would not be renewed for a fifth season.

In May 2020, an animated spinoff for kids called Mary and Flo On the Go! was reported as being in production; the web series was released in March 2022.

== Broadcast ==
Alibi in the United Kingdom aired the second season starting January 21, 2019, with the third season aired in 2020. Ovation in the United States aired seasons one and two back to back, beginning on June 15, 2019, and started airing season three on April 4, 2020. The fourth and final season premiered on October 2, 2021, following the broadcast of the new special titled Frankie Drake Mysteries: Music at Midnight, and the series concluded on December 4, 2021. Co-produced by Ovation in conjunction with the Toronto Sympathy Orchestra and Shaftesbury Films, this special features interviews and performances from series stars Chantel Riley, Sharron Matthews, and more. The special wasn't aired in Canada, instead released onto YouTube by Shaftsbury on their channel earlier in February 2021, and premiered on Ovation on September 25, 2021 at 7PM ET/4PM PT. Additionally, PBS has started broadcasting the show and offering it on-demand through its membership program, Passport. The show was further picked up in Europe, Australia, and New Zealand. In Greece the show airs in ERT3 under the title "Frankie Drake" (Φράνκι Ντρέικ) on Saturdays and Sundays at 20:00pm. The show was not so successful like Murdoch Mysteries (Ντετέκτιβ Μέρντοχ) in the past.

== Home media ==
DVDs
Title	Region 1	Region 2	Region 4
Season One	May 8, 2018	May 9, 2018 (also Blu-ray, Region B locked)	June 27, 2018
Season Two	June 25, 2019	April 8, 2019 (also Blu-ray, Region B locked)	June 26, 2019
Season Three	September 8, 2020	April 6, 2020	N/A
Season Four	September 7, 2021	May 31, 2021 (also Blu-ray, Region B locked)	N/A

== Reception ==
The series has received generally positive reviews from critics since its release. John Doyle of The Globe and Mail remarked "it's a hoot and as silly as all get-out," and concluded that "thanks to its charm and the frocks, skirts, suits and, well, the gorgeous furniture, it's frightfully good entertainment." Johanna Schneller of the Toronto Star wrote that "the messaging in CBC series sometimes hits you over the head, but it's fun to watch women run their own show." Hanh Nguyen of IndieWire wrote "inclusive casting opens up the world in a way that hasn’t been seen previously in shows set in that era. Through this lens, 1920s Toronto feels fresh and modern, a setting where almost anything can happen. ... The series holds back from crossing into didactic moralizing, but instead approaches history from a different angle, enough to be stimulating and to inspire curiosity."
