= Rebecca Liddiard =

Canadian actress (born 1991)

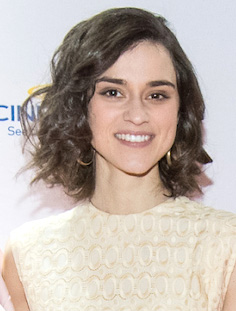
- Liddiard in 2018
- Born: January 8, 1991 (age 35); London, Ontario, Canada
- Occupation: Actress
- Years active: 2012–present

Rebecca Liddiard (born January 8, 1991) is a Canadian actress. She is known for her role as Constable Adelaide Stratton in the 2016 trans-Atlantic mystery series Houdini & Doyle and as morality officer Mary Shaw in Frankie Drake Mysteries.

== Early life and education ==
Liddiard was born in 1991 in London, Ontario. She studied theatre performance at Ryerson University. Liddiard moved to Toronto when she was 18 and worked as a part-time office manager there for some time.

== Career ==
In February 2016, Liddiard portrayed the lead character Thai in the Tarragon Theatre production of Kat Sandler's play Mustard.

She appeared as the lead character Ella in the web series MsLabelled, and had the recurring role of Hanna on the City science-fiction drama series Between.

She achieved visibility after being cast in the role of Constable Adelaide Stratton in the British-Canadian-American period mystery series Houdini & Doyle in 2016.

From 2017 to 2021, Liddiard played the regular role of Mary, a morality police officer in 1920s Toronto, in the CBC mystery-drama series, Frankie Drake Mysteries. In 2019, she played airplane crash survivor Madelyn in the first season of the British-Canadian thriller television series Departure.

== Filmography ==
Year	Title	Role	Notes
2013	Murdoch Mysteries	Lisette Barnes	Episode: "Tour de Murdoch"
2015	Man Seeking Woman	Serving Ghoul	Episode: "Stain"
2015	Between	Hanna	3 episodes
2015	MsLabelled	Ella	Voice role
2016	Saving Hope	Bree Hannigan	Episode: "Tested and Tried"
2016	Houdini & Doyle	Adelaide Stratton	Main role
2016	For Love & Honor	Kylie Brennan	Television film
2017	Reign	Princess Margot	Episode: "All It Cost Her..."
2017	Alias Grace	Mary Whitney	Miniseries
2017	Slasher	Andi Criss	Main role
2017–2021	Frankie Drake Mysteries	Mary Shaw	Main role
2018	The Detail	Emma Wright	Episode: "The Long Walk"
2019	Run This Town	Claire	Film
2019	Departure	Madelyn Strong	Main role
2021	Clarice	Eva Gallows	Episode: "Father Time"
2022, 2024	Ruby and the Well	Brea Cochrane	6 episodes
2022	Mary and Flo On the Go!	Mary Shaw	Voice role
2022	Danger in the House	Nora Reed	Television film
2022	Lease on Love/From Chicago With Love	Poppy Evans	Television film
2022	Hudson & Rex	Dr. Reva Warner	Episode: "Rexpert Witness"
2023	Seven Veils	Clea	Film
2023	Fargo	Karen Tillman	Recurring role
2024	Accused	Peggy	Episode: "Megan's Story"
2024	Woman with the Red Lipstick	Lucy Compton	Television film
2024–2025	Murdoch Mysteries	Tippy Longfellow	Episodes: "Only Murdoch in the Building" & "Going Postal"
2026	Brilliant Minds	Greer Lawton	Episode: "Through the Looking Glass"
2026	Neagley	Judith Gray	Recurring role
