= Dylan Kingwell =

Canadian actor (born 2004)

- Born: July 6, 2004 (age 22); Vancouver, British Columbia, Canada
- Occupation: Actor
- Years active: 2011–present
- Notable work: A Series of Unfortunate Events; The Good Doctor; Ruby and the Well
- Relatives: Mark Kingwell (uncle)
- Website: dylankingwell.com

Dylan Kingwell (born July 6, 2004) is a Canadian actor. He is known for playing the roles of Duncan and Quigley Quagmire in the Netflix television series A Series of Unfortunate Events and, since 2022, has starred as Sam Price in the BYUtv series Ruby and the Well. He has also had notable recurring roles as Steve Murphy in the ABC drama series The Good Doctor and as the teenaged Clark Kent in Superman & Lois for the CW. He portrayed Arthur Henderson in Hallmark's Campfire Kiss.

== Life and career ==
Kingwell was born in Vancouver, British Columbia, on July 6, 2004. In addition to English, he speaks French, Spanish and Italian. He also played hockey, throughout his childhood. His uncle Mark Kingwell is a philosopher at University of Toronto.

In 2011, Kingwell landed his first role in the comedy film To The Mat as Jordy Junior. Two years later, he appeared in the Franco-Canadian adventure film The Young and Prodigious T. S. Spivet and on the science fiction television series The Tomorrow People, aired on the CW. In 2014, he played young Coyle in the short-length film Soldiers of Earth. He also appeared in Tim Burton's Big Eyes the same year.

In 2015, he played a major role in the A&E series The Returned, an American adaptation of the French television series The Returned. Kingwell has also appeared in two Hallmark Christmas television films: Ice Sculpture Christmas as young David and The Christmas Note as Ethan. He also appeared in Wish Upon a Christmas as Danny, which aired on Lifetime. That same year, he played a young Sam Winchester in the CW series Supernatural.

In 2016, he played the character of Peyton Reddings in the television film The Wilding and also the character of Max Clark in the television thriller film A Stranger With My Kids. On September 23, 2016, he announced on his Instagram account that he would be part of the cast of the Netflix series A Series of Unfortunate Events, playing Duncan and Quigley, the two twin brother characters who made up part of the Quagmire triplets. Kingwell initially appeared in a recurring role during the first season but was promoted to the main cast for the series' second season.

Beginning in 2017, he appeared on the ABC television series The Good Doctor in the recurring role of Steve Murphy, the younger brother of title character Shaun Murphy. Steve died in an accident before the events of the show and appears in flashback sequences.

In 2020, he played Luca on the science fiction television series The 100 in its seventh and final season. He also played the role of Sam Thomas in the series The Baby-Sitters Club.

In 2021, he played a young Clark Kent in the superhero drama television series Superman & Lois.

From 2022 to 2024, he played Sam Price in the fantasy television series Ruby and the Well.

== Filmography ==
Film and television appearances by Dylan Kingwell
Year	Title	Role	Notes
2011	To the Mat	Jordy Junior	Television film
2013	The Tomorrow People	Young Stephen	Episode: "In Too Deep"
2013	The Young and Prodigious T. S. Spivet	Little boy	Film
2014	Big Eyes	Boy at art show	Film
2015	The Christmas Note	Ethan	Television film
2015	Ice Sculpture Christmas	Young David	Television film
2015	The Returned	Victor / Henry Garrity / Zach	Main role
2015	Supernatural	Young Sam Winchester	Episode: "Just My Imagination"
2015	Wish Upon a Christmas	Danny	Television film
2016	The Wilding	Peyton Reddings	Television film
2017	Campfire Kiss	Arthur Henderson	Television film
2017	Escape from Mr. Lemoncello's Library	Sean Keegan	Television film
2017	A Stranger with My Kids	Max Clark	Television film
2017–2019	A Series of Unfortunate Events	Duncan Quagmire / Quigley Quagmire	Guest (season 1); main role (seasons 2–3)
2017–2022	The Good Doctor	Steve Murphy / Evan Gallico	Recurring role (Steve only)
2020–2021	The Baby-Sitters Club	Sam Thomas	Recurring role
2020	The 100	Luca	Recurring role (season 7)
2021	Superman & Lois	Young Clark Kent	3 episodes
2022–2024	Ruby and the Well	Sam Price	Main role
2025	Taste of His Own Poison	Sawyer	Television film
2026	Off Campus	Joe Rogers	Recurring role
