= Tori Anderson =

Canadian actress

- Born: Victoria Anderson; Edmonton, Alberta, Canada
- Occupation: Actress
- Years active: 2003–present
- Spouse: Mitch Myers (m. 2018)

Victoria Anderson is a Canadian actress. She is known for her television roles, such as Dr. London Blake on the TeenNick/YTV series Open Heart, Queen Titania on the Nickelodeon series The Other Kingdom, and Evie on The CW series No Tomorrow. From 2021 until its cancellation in 2024, she played Kate Whistler on the CBS series NCIS: Hawaiʻi.

== Life and career ==
Anderson is from Edmonton, Alberta, and graduated from Frances Kelsey Secondary School in Mill Bay, British Columbia. She has a fine-arts degree from York University, and graduated magna cum laude in acting in 2011.

In 2014 Anderson was cast in the 2015 YTV/TeenNick series Open Heart where she played the role of Dr. London Blake, the older sister of the lead character. She also played PR expert Drew on the web series MsLabelled. In 2016 Anderson had a recurring role on the Nickelodeon series The Other Kingdom, playing the Fairy Queen Titania, the lead character's mother.

Anderson starred as Evie in The CW series No Tomorrow which was ordered to series in May 2016 and premiered in October. In 2017 she began playing the recurring role of Blake Crawford on the NBC television series Blindspot. In June 2021, Anderson was cast in the regular role of Kate Whistler in the CBS drama series NCIS: Hawai'i.

== Filmography ==
Television roles
Year	Title	Role	Notes
2003	The Twilight Zone	Teen	Episode: "Developing"; uncredited
2003	Tru Calling	Meredith Davies – Age 15	Episode: Pilot; as Victoria Anderson
2004	Cable Beach	Ben's Young Mom	Television film; as Victoria Anderson
2004	Smallville	Rebecca	Episode: "Truth"; as Victoria Anderson
2006	The Mermaid Chair	Dee Sullivan	Television film; as Victoria Anderson
2006	To Have and to Hold	Erica	Television film; as Victoria Anderson
2007	The 4400	Amber	Episode: "The Wrath of Graham"; as Victoria Anderson
2010	The Troop	Jenny	Episode: "Unpleasantville"; as Victoria Anderson
2012	Mayday	Lee Brumiester	Episode: "Nowhere to Land"; as Victoria Anderson
2012	Murdoch Mysteries	Lucille Messing	Episodes: "Stroll on the Wild Side, parts 1 and 2"
2012	Rookie Blue	Liz Adams	Episode: "The Girlfriend Experience"
2012	The L.A. Complex	Charlotte	Recurring role, 6 episodes
2012	Flashpoint	Della / Day Care Worker #1	Episode: "Keep the Peace: Part 1"; as Victoria Anderson
2013	Blink	Rachel	Unsold television pilot
2014	Warehouse 13	Princess	Episode: "A Faire to Remember"
2014	Killing Daddy	Laura Ross	Television film
2015	Reign	Lady Atley	Episode: "Getaway"
2015	Backstrom	Alyson Cox	Episode: "Dragon Slayer"
2015	Open Heart	Dr. London Blake	Main role
2015	MsLabelled	Drew	Web series; 19 episodes
2016	The Other Kingdom	Queen Titania	Recurring role, 10 episodes
2016	Killjoys	Sabine	Episodes: "Schooled", "Meet the Parents", "I Love Lucy", "Heart-Shaped Box"
2016–2017	No Tomorrow	Evie	Lead role
2017–2020	Blindspot	Blake Crawford	Recurring role (seasons 3–5)
2018	Caught	Ada	Main role
2018	Return to Christmas Creek	Amelia Hughes	Television film
2019	Ransom	Sasha Levant	Episode: "Indiscretion"
2019	Love Under the Olive Tree	Nicole Cabella	Television film
2020	Spotlight on Christmas	Olivia O'Hara	Television film
2021	You May Kiss the Bridesmaid	Scarlett Bailey	Television film
2021	A Chance For Christmas	Christina A. Chance	Television film
2021–2024	NCIS: Hawai'i	Kate Whistler	Main role
2021	The Secret Sauce	Laura Glickman	Television film
2022	A Bridesmaid in Love	Cate James	Television film
2022	Campfire Christmas	Peyton	Television film
2026	Watson	Aubrey Kowalski	Episode: "For a Limited Time Only"
