= An Old Fashioned Thanksgiving =

- Based on: short story by Louisa May Alcott
- Written by: Shelley Evans
- Directed by: Graeme Campbell
- Starring: Jacqueline Bisset; Helene Joy
- Theme music composer: James Gelfand
- Country of origin: United States
- Original language: English

Production
- Producers: Michael Prupas; Steve Solomos
- Cinematography: Mitchell Ness
- Editor: Jean Beaudoin
- Running time: 90 minutes

Original release
- Network: Hallmark Channel
- Release: November 22, 2008

An Old Fashioned Thanksgiving is a television film loosely based on a short story by Louisa May Alcott. Filmed on location in Canada, the film premiered on Hallmark Channel on November 22, 2008. It was followed by the sequel, An Old Fashioned Christmas which aired on December 11, 2010.

== Synopsis ==
Widow Mary Bassett (Helene Joy) and her three children have hit difficult times on their farm; it is especially apparent when they cannot even afford a turkey for their Thanksgiving dinner. Oldest daughter Tilly (Tatiana Maslany) writes to Mary's wealthy and estranged mother Isabella (Jacqueline Bisset), exaggerating their situation in a lengthy letter. Isabella comes to the farm to offer her help and finds a kindred spirit in Tilly. However, Mary resents her mother's attempts to help them out of their financial difficulties.

== Cast ==
- Jacqueline Bisset as Isabella
- Helene Joy as Mary Bassett
- Tatiana Maslany as Mathilda "Tilly" Bassett
- Kristopher Turner as Gad Hopkins
- Ted Atherton as Gad Hopkins father
- Gage Munroe as Solomon Bassett

== Reception ==
When the film premiered on the Hallmark Channel, it gained 5.2 million viewers, delivering a 3.2 household rating and nearly 2.8 million homes, making it the highest-rated cable movie of the premiere day and week. It also ranked No. 1 in the time period for household and total viewer ratings and deliveries, and boosted the network to rank first in prime Ttme for the day. This made Hallmark Channel rank sixth for the week. This made the film the fifth-highest-rated original movie in the network's history to its date, and its fourth-most-watched original movie among households. It is also the network's most watched and highest-rated November original movie ever.

Critics' reviews, however, were mixed. Star magazine called the film "stuffy", while the TV Examiner claimed "Hallmark Channel has cranked a sweet, ultimately uplifting old school holiday film" and called it an "old style of made-for-TV film".
