= Ruby and the Well =

Family fantasy TV show on BYUtv

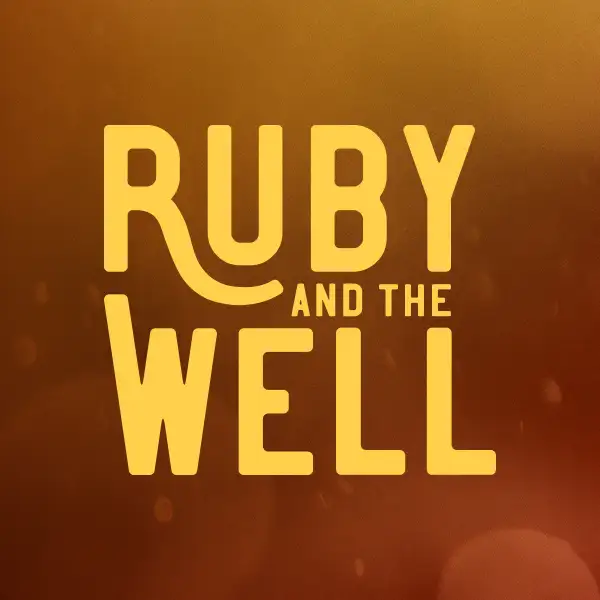
- Genre: Fantasy
- Created by: LeeAnne H. Adams & Brian J. Adams
- Starring: Zoe Wiesenthal; Kristopher Turner; Joel Oulette; Lina Sienna; Dylan Kingwell; Nobahar Dadui; Paula Boudreau
- Music by: Lora Bidner & Robert Carli
- Countries of origin: United States; Canada
- Original language: English
- No. of seasons: 4
- No. of episodes: 36

Production
- Executive producers: LeeAnne H. Adams; Brian J. Adams; Suzanne Bolch; Scott Garvie; Christina Jennings; Anne Loi; John May; Jennifer McCann; Andra Johnson Duke; Michael A. Dunn; Jeff Simpson; Erik Christensen; Liz Levine; Felipe Rodriguez
- Producers: Wendy Grean; Stephen Montgomery; Marek Posival; Linda Pope; Alex House
- Running time: 43–45 minutes
- Production companies: WildBrain Studios; Shaftesbury Films; BYUtv

Original release
- Network: BYUtv; Family Channel
- Release: February 27, 2022 – November 24, 2024

Ruby and the Well is a fantasy television series on BYUtv that premiered in the United States on February 27, 2022. The show features a present-day teenager whose father inherits an orchard in Emerald. This leads to the two moving to Emerald where Ruby discovers a wishing well. Once she makes contact with the wishing well, Ruby becomes the new keeper of the well and must grant the well's wishes so that the town can prosper.

== Plot ==
Ruby is a present-day teenager who is forced to move to Emerald after her father, Daniel, inherits an orchard. While exploring the property Ruby finds a wishing well and is shown a wish that she must help fulfill.

As a newcomer to Emerald, Ruby has a hard time knowing whom to trust. However, she befriended two locals: Sam and Mina. With their knowledge of the town and her ability to reach out to others, Ruby might be able to bring the town of Emerald out of the economic depression it has been stuck in for years.

== Cast and characters ==
=== Main ===
- Zoe Wiesenthal as Ruby O'Reilly. Ruby is a 14-year-old girl who moves to Emerald after her father, Daniel, inherits an orchard. She discovers a magic wishing well and becomes the keeper of the well. As keeper of the well she must help grant wishes that in turn will bless the town and bring them prosperity.
- Kristopher Turner as Daniel O'Reilly. Daniel is a single father who loves Ruby. He moves to Emerald after he inherits the orchard because he and Ruby have lost everything after the recent loss of his wife.
- Joel Oulette as Benjamin "Ben" Taggart (season 1). A resident of Emerald whose father died before the events of the series. He originally told the O'Reillys his name was Brett.
- Lina Sennia as Mina Amani. Mina has a great deal of loyalty and is Ruby's best friend in Emerald. However she also refuses to do anything that could bring about any harm.
- Dylan Kingwell as Sam Price. Sam Price is an adopted local who has never met his parents, but he has done a great deal of research on the myths and legends of Emerald. As such he knows all about the rumors of the keeper of the well and how wishes must be granted instead of received.
- Paula Boudreau as Paula Price (main seasons 1–2; recurring seasons 3–4). Paula has lived her entire life in Emerald, and she wants to make a future for her adopted son Sam. She quickly befriends Daniel, but when her and Daniel have conflictual feelings on the well she must make a choice that could help or harm them all.
- Nobahar Dadui as Ava Amani (main seasons 1–2; recurring season 3; guest season 4). Ava owns the town's hardware store and is Mina's mother.

=== Recurring ===
- Sharron Matthews as Lucy LaFontaine. Lucy is the town busybody and the owner/operator of a florist shop
- Patrick Haye as Vince Clark (seasons 1–3). A police officer in Emerald who occasionally helps Ruby. He is also the brother of Emily Taggart and step-uncle of Ben.
- Jani Lauzon as Halona Tl'zilani. The owner of the Orchard Grille.
- Hannan Younis as Emily Taggart (season 1). Emily is a lawyer in Emerald and Ben's stepmother.
- Ben Carlson as Foster Brody (recurring season 1; guest seasons 2–3). The town librarian
- Steven McCarthy as Nathan Lutes (recurring seasons 1 & 3; guest season 2). A man sent to Emerald to scope out land for a huge development.
- Parker Lauzon as Kevin Murphy (guest seasons 1–2; recurring seasons 3–4). A classmate of Ruby's who is very curious about what she, Mina and Sam do.
- Kyle Breitkopf as Sebastian Lutes. Nathan's son
- Rebecca Liddiard as Brea Cochrane (guest seasons 1–2; recurring season 4). an Emerald resident who keeps bees.
- Gabriel Darku as Peter "Pete" Evers. Pete is the owner and head mechanic at a local mechanic shop.
- Genevieve DeGraves as Dee Abelard (recurring season 2; guest season 3). The granddaughter of Lou Abelard and employee at Abelard's Salvage.
- Michael Copeman as Liam O'Reilly (seasons 2–3). Daniel's father and Ruby's paternal grandfather
- Josette Jorge as Leah Miranda (recurring season 3; guest season 4). A resident of Emerald who dates Daniel however, they break up in season 4.
- Jayne Eastwood as Miss Freda Grady (guest season 3–4), an elderly Emerald resident who likes to complain.

== Episodes ==
Season	Episodes	Originally released	
Season	Episodes	First released	Last released
1	10	February 27, 2022	April 23, 2022
2	10	September 15, 2022	November 20, 2022
3	8	September 30, 2023	November 19, 2023
4	8	September 8, 2024	November 24, 2024

=== Season 1 (2022) ===
No. overall	No. in season	Title	Directed by	Written by	Original release date
1	1	"I Wish He Were Still Here"	Felipe Rodriguez	LeeAnne H. Adams & Brian J. Adams	February 27, 2022 (BYUtv & byutv.org)
Ruby and Daniel move to the town of Emerald where Daniel has inherited an apple orchard. However everything at Emerald is slowly withering and dying with businesses closing and the water drying up. After arriving at the new property Ruby begins to explore. A mysterious light leads her to the well, and she is given a wish to fulfill, "I Wish He Were Still Here." Now Ruby must figure out who needs to be there while making new friends and navigating a town that she is completely unfamiliar with, but with so many people mistrusting the name O'Reilly Ruby may find adjusting to the town a lot harder than she ever expected it to be. Introducing: Zoe Wiesenthal as Ruby O'Reilly, Kristopher Turner as Daniel O'Reilly, Lina Sennia as Mina Amani, Dylan Kingwell as Sam Price, Joel Oulette as Ben Taggart, Nobahar Dadui as Ava Amani; Guest stars: Hannan Younis as Emily Taggart, Gabriel Darku as Peter Evers,
2	2	"I Wish I Knew Where to Start"	Felipe Rodriguez	Suzanne Bolch, John May, & Alan McCullough	February 27, 2022 (BYUtv & byutv.org)
Ruby and her friends help the local town librarian figure out what an old treasure map in the local library leads to, and it may help save the library. The only problem is the local library is actually closed, and any intrusion into it could lead not only to trespassing charges but also serving some sort of time. Featuring: Zoe Wiesenthal as Ruby O'Reilly, Kristopher Turner as Daniel O'Reilly, Lina Sennia as Mina Amani, Dylan Kingwell as Sam Price, Joel Oulette as Ben Taggart, Nobahar Dadui as Ava Amani; Recurring characters: Hannan Younis as Emily Taggart, Guest stars: Sharron Matthews as Lucy LaFontaine, Ben Carlson as Foster Brody, Patrick Haye as Officer Vince Clark, Kwaku Adu-Poku as Mr. Abban, Tess Benger as Summer O'Reilly, River Price-Maenpaa as Young Ruby
3	3	"I Wish I Could Walk With Her"	Harvey Crossland	Alan McCullough	February 27, 2022 (byutv.org); March 6, 2022 (BYUtv)
Wedding bells are about to ring in Emerald, and the wedding leads Ruby to a wish to help fulfill one fathers desire to walk with his daughter down the aisle. However the man who wants to do so has been convicted of arson in the past, and no one is sure if they can believe he won't cause something similar at the wedding. What will Ruby decide to do? Featuring: Zoe Wiesenthal as Ruby O'Reilly, Kristopher Turner as Daniel O'Reilly, Lina Sennia as Mina Amani, Dylan Kingwell as Sam Price, Joel Oulette as Ben Taggart; Introducing: Paula Boudreau as Paula Price; Recurring characters: Sharron Matthews as Lucy LaFontaine, Patrick Haye as Officer Vince Clark, Hannan Younis as Emily Taggart; Guest stars: Gage Graham-Arbuthnot as Braden Brogden, Billy MacLellan as Ralph Brogden, Paul Braunstein as Dennis Brogden, Nicolette Pearse as Jessica Brogden, Hannah Levinson as Molly LaFontaine, Jani Lauzon as Halona TL'Izilani, Keanu Lee Nunes as Greg Moore, Roland Gerber as Photographer
4	4	"I Wish She Would Trust Me"	Harvey Crossland	Suzanne Bolch & John May	February 27, 2022 (byutv.org); March 13, 2022 (BYUtv)
A young girl wishes her mom could trust her. Mina quickly realizes that the descriptions match high school students, but even with the limited number of high school students it doesn't seem like a wish Ruby and company can fulfill unless they get some help from outside sources. Will anyone be willing to trust her though when she's only a middle schooler? And even if she can bond with the high schooler, can she convince her father that the wishing well and being keeper of the well is a real thing when he can't see the wishes? Featuring: Zoe Wiesenthal as Ruby O'Reilly, Kristopher Turner as Daniel O'Reilly, Lina Sennia as Mina Amani, Dylan Kingwell as Sam Price, Paula Boudreau as Paula Price, Joel Oulette as Ben Taggart, Nobahar Dadui as Ava Amani; Recurring characters: Patrick Haye as Officer Vince Clark; Guest stars: Michelle Monteith as Elena Fitzgerald, Brian Paul as Langston Pritchard, Miku Martineau as Amy Fitzgerald, Amanda Cheung as Gillian, Robert Bazzocchi as Wes Russell, Richard Waugh as Mr. Russell, Jinny Wong as Millie
5	5	"I Wish I Got The Credit I Deserve"	Felipe Rodriguez	Dan Trotta (story), Suzanne Bolch & John May (Teleplay)	February 27, 2022 (byutv.org); March 20, 2022 (BYUtv)
Ruby decides to tell Daniel about the well. Daniel thinks it maybe Ruby's imagination running wild and seeks the advice of some friends on how he can help her deal with stress. Meanwhile Ruby gets a wish to fulfill in which a local scientist wishes she got the credit for some discoveries she made that were stolen from her. While trying to help fulfill the wish though Ruby learns that not all people who seem innocent are so. Featuring: Zoe Wiesenthal as Ruby O'Reilly, Kristopher Turner as Daniel O'Reilly, Lina Sennia as Mina Amani, Dylan Kingwell as Sam Price, Paula Boudreau as Paula Price, Joel Oulette as Ben Taggart, Nobahar Dadui as Ava Amani; Recurring characters: Sharron Matthews as Lucy LaFontaine, Ben Carlson as Foster Brody, Hannah Levinson as Molly LaFontaine, Jani Lauzon as Halona TL'Izilani; Guest stars: Rebecca Liddiard as Brea Cochrane, Kyle Buchanan as August Villette, Jim Codrington as Dr. R. Harmon
6	6	"I Wish I Could Stop Pretending"	Felipe Rodriguez	Nathalie Younglai	February 27, 2022 (byutv.org); March 27, 2022 (BYUtv)
Ruby gets a wish vision that seems very strange to her. She know the wish was made by a man, that it involves coins, and that the man to whom it pertains is actually very sweet and a grandfather even though he has a very rough demeanor. At first she thinks it applies to one of her teachers, but when she spies on him all the evidence seems contrary. Eventually the group comes across another possibility, but what is the big secret that he has lied about all these many years, and why is it making him seems so cross? Featuring: Zoe Wiesenthal as Ruby O'Reilly, Kristopher Turner as Daniel O'Reilly, Lina Sennia as Mina Amani, Dylan Kingwell as Sam Price, Paula Boudreau as Paula Price; Recurring characters: Ben Carlson as Foster Brody, Hannah Levinson as Molly LaFontaine, Patrick Haye as Officer Vince Clark, Jani Lauzon as Halona TL'Izilani; Guest stars: Steven McCarthy as Nathan Lutes, Brian Paul as Langston Pritchard, Jenny Raven as Angela, Robert Clarke as Mr. Ellis, Deborah Tennant as Eleanor Pritchard, Emeka Agada as Johnny C., Dax Catre as Leon
7	7	"I Wish I Could Have Another Chance"	Harvey Crossland	Alan McCullough	February 27, 2022 (byutv.org); April 3, 2022 (BYUtv)
The Emerald Apple Festival is back in action with the resurgence of the town spring, and a lot of the town seems to be back to thriving. While a friendly wager is made between Ruby and her friends, the group learns things won't be as easy as they could be with some needed items being held at Applelarts, a local pawn shop where everything is inflated. Meanwhile a double wish is made in which two individuals are hoping to get another chance at love, but when everything tied to the wish seems to bring up hard feelings Ruby begins to wonder if this could be her first failure. Featuring: Zoe Wiesenthal as Ruby O'Reilly, Kristopher Turner as Daniel O'Reilly, Lina Sennia as Mina Amani, Dylan Kingwell as Sam Price, Paula Boudreau as Paula Price, Joel Oulette as Ben Taggart, Nobahar Dadui as Ava Amani; Recurring characters: Gabriel Darku as Peter Evers, Steven McCarthy as Nathan Lutes, Jani Lauzon as Halona TL'Izilani; Guest stars: Ana Sani as Tessa, Martin Doyle as Spencer Abelard
8	8	"I Wish I Could Meet My Family"	Harvey Crossland	Nathalie Younglai	February 27, 2022 (byutv.org); April 10, 2022 (BYUtv)
Ruby's grandparents come to Emerald to visit Ruby and Daniel. They hope the two are doing ok and that they can help them get over the death of Summer. However neither group realizes the other is hoping to protect them from harsh feelings. Meanwhile Ruby gets a wish with a young boy's voice saying he wishes he could meet his family. Soon after Ruby and Mina realize the wisher is Sam. Sam has always known he was adopted, and his heart's desire is to know where he came from. While Ruby and Mina try to help him find the answers though a heart condition strikes Sam and lands him in the hospital, leaving Ruby and Mina to question whether or not they can trust Paula with the answers to Sam's wish or if Sam is truly better off not knowing this mystery. Featuring: Zoe Wiesenthal as Ruby O'Reilly, Kristopher Turner as Daniel O'Reilly, Lina Sennia as Mina Amani, Dylan Kingwell as Sam Price, Paula Boudreau as Paula Price, Joel Oulette as Ben Taggart; Recurring characters: Steven McCarthy as Nathan Lutes; Guest stars: Deborah Grover as Gram Wilton, Roger Dunn as Grandad Wilton, Ordena Stephens-Thompson as Aiysha, Kate Campbell as Doctor
9	9	"I Wish I Could Get Back at Her"	Felipe Rodriguez	Thomas Conway & Alan McCullough	February 27, 2022 (byutv.org); April 17, 2022 (BYUtv)
Nathan Lutes tries to buy up the town for his company so they can use the spring water for their own purposes, but when it involves buying up the well and destroying it Ruby convinces Daniel that they need to wait because the town needs to well in order to survive. Meanwhile Ruby receives her most intense wish ever as it involves revenge during a local production of Peter Pan, and the one thing Mina refuses to do is help with a revenge plot. Featuring: Zoe Wiesenthal as Ruby O'Reilly, Kristopher Turner as Daniel O'Reilly, Lina Sennia as Mina Amani, Dylan Kingwell as Sam Price, Paula Boudreau as Paula Price, Nobahar Dadui as Ava Amani; Recurring characters: Steven McCarthy as Nathan Lutes, Sharron Matthews as Lucy LaFontaine, Kwaku Adu-Poku as Mr. Abban, Martin Doyle as Spencer Abelard; Guest stars: Madison Voll as Solange Hill, Kalista Wilson as Emma Reyes, Parker Lauzon as Kevin Murphy, Craig Warnock as Donnel O'Reilly, Jeanie Calleja as Reporter
10	10	"I Wish We'd Stayed Friends"	Harvey Crossland	Suzanne Bolch, John May, & Alan McCullough	February 27, 2022 (byutv.org); April 24, 2022 (BYUtv)
Paula and old Tom were once lovers, but Paula has refused to talk about that time in her life. She has always thought that Tom became an old hoarder and a cranky old man because he hated the town, but little does she realize what actually caused that to happen was heartbreak after she rejected his marriage proposal. When she begins seeing Ruby having the same kind of obsession with the well she realizes she might have to be the one to put a stop to it. Little does she realize the latest wish Ruby receives will actually reveal not only did Tom remain a heartbroken lover, but it will reveal who saved Sam's life when he was a newborn with a very rare blood type that very few people have. Featuring: Zoe Wiesenthal as Ruby O'Reilly, Kristopher Turner as Daniel O'Reilly, Lina Sennia as Mina Amani, Dylan Kingwell as Sam Price, Paula Boudreau as Paula Price; Recurring characters: Steven McCarthy as Nathan Lutes, Deborah Tennant as Eleanor Pritchard, Hannan Younis as Emily Taggart, Brian Paul as Langston Pritchard, Jani Lauzon as Halona TL'Izilani, Martin Doyle as Spencer Abelard; Guest stars: Eric Tzogas as Young Thomas O'Reilly

=== Season 2 (2022) ===
No. overall	No. in season	Title	Directed by	Written by	Original release date
11	1	"I Wish Things Could've Turned Out Differently"	Felipe Rodriguez	Suzanne Bolch & John May	September 15, 2022 (Family Channel); September 18, 2022 (byutv.org & BYUtv)
After a series of brief stays the court rules against Daniel and grants the land to the water company. Shortly after learning the result Ruby is given her first wish in months. In the wish Nathan Lutes wishes things turned out differently. Shortly after receiving the wish Nathan arrives in town with his son and wife. The gang learns that Nathan's father-in-law owns the company and has caused him a lot of stress because he's always taking him away from home. The affect also causes his son to feel isolated and abandoned. Only by helping Nathan's family overcome their inner demons can the well be saved, but is there any hope for doing so when the two sides have become bitter enemies? Featuring: Zoe Wiesenthal as Ruby O'Reilly, Kristopher Turner as Daniel O'Reilly, Lina Sennia as Mina Amani, Dylan Kingwell as Sam Price, Paula Boudreau as Paula Price; Recurring characters: Steven McCarthy as Nathan Lutes, Nobahar Dadui as Ava Amani, Sharron Matthews as Lucy LaFontaine; Guest stars: Kyle Breitkopf as Sebastian Lutes, Rob Stewart as Aidan Barstow, Genevieve DeGraves as Dee Abelard, Marisa McIntyre as Corrine Barstow Lutes
12	2	"I Wish I Could Find Her"	Felipe Rodriguez	Suzanne Bolch & John May	September 18, 2022 (byutv.org); September 22, 2022 (Family Channel)
Ruby's Grandpa O'Reilly tries to convince Daniel to sell the orchard and move back to the big city. What they don't know though is he blames himself for how his brother turned out because he feels he was the first individual to turn his back on Tom. Meanwhile the well informs Ruby of a man apparently seeking love, but in reality he's looking for his missing dog. As Ruby, Sam, and Mina attempt to solve the wish they realize it's ok to make mistakes because it's all part of being human. Featuring: Zoe Wiesenthal as Ruby O'Reilly, Kristopher Turner as Daniel O'Reilly, Lina Sennia as Mina Amani, Dylan Kingwell as Sam Price; Recurring characters: Genevieve DeGraves as Dee Aberlard, Nobahar Dadui as Ava Amani, Ben Carlson as Foster Brody, Patrick Haye as Officer Vince Clark, Robert Bazzocchi as Wes Russell; Guest stars: Shazdeh Kapadia as Anjali, Shaun Shetty as Dr. Halemani, Michelle Mohammed as Tanya, Nicholas Tull as Greg, Michael Copeman as Liam O'Reilly
13	3	"I Wish I Could Get Away"	Harvey Crossland	Noelle Girard	September 18, 2022 (byutv.org); September 29, 2022 (Family Channel)
Ruby's newest wish takes a huge surprise turn when one of the town members wishes she could get away. While trying to find out whom the wish giver is Ruby learns the local flower shop owner never gets a day off with funerals, Easter, school activities, Christmas, and many other holidays always causing her trouble with days off. Can Ruby help figure out what a day off might entitle without leaving town, especially when the floral shop gets robbed? Meanwhile Ruby begins to worry about Daniel after she realizes he doesn't seem to have any local town friends, forcing him to always hang out with the younger generation. However when she spots Daniel hanging out with another woman, Ruby begins to fear what the future may hold. Featuring: Zoe Wiesenthal as Ruby O'Reilly, Kristopher Turner as Daniel O'Reilly, Lina Sennia as Mina Amani, Dylan Kingwell as Sam Price; Recurring characters: Genevieve DeGraves as Dee Aberlard, Sharron Matthews as Lucy LaFontaine, Kyle Breitkopf as Sebastian Lutes, Nobahar Dadui as Ava Amani, Hannah Levinson as Molly LaFontaine, Rebecca Liddiard as Brea Cochrane; Guest stars: Michael Hough as Mike LaFontaine, Lindsay Leese as Bethany
14	4	"I Wish We Could Get Back Together"	Harvey Crossland	Ken Cuperus	September 18, 2022 (byutv.org); October 6, 2022 (Family Channel)
Ruby's latest wish appears to be the hardest she's had yet. The well shows the wish of an individual that wants to get "the band" back together. Ruby quickly realizes that the famous singer Rachel Crewe is supposed to be part of the wish, but with no way to contact her and with musical venues falling through continually Ruby begins to realize this is one wish that might not be able to be fulfilled without the help of her friends and without learning the past of "the band" found within the wish. Featuring: Zoe Wiesenthal as Ruby O'Reilly, Kristopher Turner as Daniel O'Reilly, Lina Sennia as Mina Amani, Dylan Kingwell as Sam Price, Paula Boudreau as Paula Price; Recurring characters: Gabriel Darku as Peter Evers, Paul Braunstein as Dennis Brogden, Robert Clarke as Mr. Ellis, Jani Lauzon as Halona Tl'Izilani, Hannan Younis as Emily Taggart, Patrick Haye as Officer Vince Clark; Guest stars: Kimberly-Ann Truong as Rachel Crewe, Alexandra Augustine as Isla Hanson, Emily Shelton as Ms. Bailey
15	5	"I Wish I Could Spend Time With Her"	Eleanore Lindo	Nathalie Younglai	September 18, 2022 (byutv.org); October 13, 2022 (Family Channel)
For 15 years Officer Clark has searched for his missing older sister but with no success. His biggest desire is to either be united with her again or to at least get closure. When his deepest desire is delivered to the well Ruby becomes the newest individual to be involved in the search, but when she uncovers clues that Officer Clark's sister left the country to help in Earthquake relief it could lead to the biggest heartbreak she has ever had to face. Meanwhile Daniel tries to find the oldest original apple tree in his families orchard so that he can create a new G2 O'Reilly Apple, but when most of the G1 apple trees were destroyed by a fire, he learns he must first unlock some of the families mysteries to find where the oldest tree was placed. Featuring: Zoe Wiesenthal as Ruby O'Reilly, Kristopher Turner as Daniel O'Reilly, Lina Sennia as Mina Amani, Dylan Kingwell as Sam Price, Paula Boudreau as Paula Price; Recurring characters: Sharron Matthews as Lucy LaFontaine, Patrick Haye as Officer Vince Clark, Hannan Younis as Emily Taggart, Gabriel Darku as Peter Evers, Genevieve DeGraves as Dee Aberlard, Nobahar Dadui as Ava Amani; Guest stars: Nadia Casandra as Young Kendra Clark, Andres Romo Salido as NGO Coordinator, Justice James as Young Vince Clark, Barbara de la Fuente as Fabiola, Antonio Ortega as Teacher
16	6	"I Wish They Would Just Listen"	Eleanore Lindo	Alan McCullough	October 1, 2022 (byutv.org); October 20, 2022 (Family Channel)
Ruby's newest wish continues to build the difficulty at solving them. Ruby sees many visions, but she hears no actual wish. Shortly thereafter Sam helps Ruby realize that the wish probably involves sign language. After getting a little help from Sebastian Lutes, Ruby and Mina are able to find whom the wisher is. Will they be able to help her fulfill her wish though when it involves traveling to another country and when they begin to realize that the wisher's parents are always arguing in public? Meanwhile Daniel lets it slip that his father wants him and Ruby to leave Emerald. Lucy mistakes this to mean that he and Ruby are going to leave Emerald and are looking for a new place to move to, but when she informs the rest of the community (without Daniel's knowledge), he begins to fear the entire town will think he and Ruby are liars if he comes out and says they aren't moving and had never planned to. Featuring: Zoe Wiesenthal as Ruby O'Reilly, Kristopher Turner as Daniel O'Reilly, Lina Sennia as Mina Amani, Dylan Kingwell as Sam Price; Recurring characters: Sharron Matthews as Lucy LaFontaine, Kyle Breitkopf as Sebastian Lutes, Nobahar Dadui as Ava Amani, Brian Paul as Langston Pritchard, Robert Bazzocchi as Wes Russell, Jani Lauzon as Halona Tl'Izilani; Guest stars: Amanda Richer as Danna Byrne, Fiona Highet as Joan Byrne, Evan Buliung as Doug Byrne
17	7	"I Wish I Had Some Space"	Harvey Crossland	Jennifer Daley	October 1, 2022 (byutv.org); October 27, 2022 (Family Channel)
Ruby's latest wish involves some very confusing clues: a card of some sort, a key hold, and a desire to have some space. However the wisher, Principal Donovan, doesn't seem to want any space away from her daughter or grandson. Can Ruby and friends figure out how to solve the wish without destroying and pre-existing family relationships, and can Sam manage to survive a rambunctious 6-year old Xavier who looks at him as more of a big brother than a babysitter? Featuring: Zoe Wiesenthal as Ruby O'Reilly, Kristopher Turner as Daniel O'Reilly, Lina Sennia as Mina Amani, Dylan Kingwell as Sam Price; Recurring characters: Nobahar Dadui as Ava Amani, Jani Lauzon as Halona Tl'Izilani, Parker Lauzon as Kevin Murphy, Kwaku Adu-Poku as Mr. Abban; Guest stars: Kate Trotter as Principal Jane Donovan, Nisa Gunduz as Charlotte Donovan, Lorcan Deiseach as Xavier Donovan, Isolde Ardies as Viole O'Reilly
18	8	"I Wish I Could Get It Back"	Harvey Crossland	Jennifer Kassabian	October 1, 2022 (byutv.org); November 3, 2022 (Family Channel)
When Ava's purse gets stolen, the group realizes it ties into Ruby's newest wish to fulfill. The unfortunate part is the it falls at the same time as Mina's birthday. Shortly thereafter the group discovers that the towns sewer has entrances into most of the shops along Main Street and that it is the perfect place to hide stolen goods. Will the group want to capture the criminal though when they realize the reason they've been stealing goods has to do with supporting family since their parents recently lost their job? Featuring: Zoe Wiesenthal as Ruby O'Reilly, Kristopher Turner as Daniel O'Reilly, Lina Sennia as Mina Amani, Dylan Kingwell as Sam Price, Paula Boudreau as Paula Price; Recurring characters: Nobahar Dadui as Ava Amani, Patrick Haye as Officer Vince Clark, Genevieve DeGraves as Dee Aberlard, Kyle Breitkopf as Sebastian Lutes, Jinny Wong as Millie, Parker Lauzon as Kevin Murphy, Isolde Ardies as Viole O'Reilly; Guest stars: Liam McDonald as Ronan, Jonathan Malen as Freddie, Jacklyn Francis as Georgia
19	9	"I Wish I Could Stop Hurting"	Peter Stebbings	Jason Whiting	October 1, 2022 (byutv.org); November 10, 2022 (Family Channel)
The latest wish causes the gang to divide into two fronts. While Ruby and Mina try to figure out who is in pain and how to help them stop hurting, Sam teams up with Daniel to try and find out whom keeps walking across the O'Reilly Orchard and whom the mysterious lady is in Ruby's visions. Troubles arise when the group realizes the wish involves the Aberlard's, the hardest family to try to connect to in all of Emerald. Featuring: Zoe Wiesenthal as Ruby O'Reilly, Kristopher Turner as Daniel O'Reilly, Lina Sennia as Mina Amani, Dylan Kingwell as Sam Price; Recurring characters: Sharron Matthews as Lucy LaFontaine, Genevieve DeGraves as Dee Aberlard, Ordena Stephens-Thompson as Aiysha, Isolde Ardies as Viole O'Reilly, Michael Copeman as Liam O'Reilly; Guest stars: Eric Peterson as Lou Aberlard, Jana Peck as Rose Aberlard, Bill MacDonald as Wally Talbot
20	10	"I Wish the Well Would Let Us Be"	Peter Stebbings	Suzanne Bolch, John May, & Mike McPhaden	October 1, 2022 (byutv.org); November 17, 2022 (Family Channel)
Ruby's latest wish may be her hardest one ever to grant. Her Grandfather Liam has found a clause that allows him to declare his brother insane and make the will that granted Daniel and Ruby the land to be his. Further more he has wished that the well will let them be. Ruby learns that the theory behind removing herself as a wish granter is fairly simple- she just needs to remove her name from the stones. However the well begins to protect itself and move her name around. In the end it may help her Grandfather see the truth behind the well, but if not it could result in Ruby becoming severely hurt. Featuring: Zoe Wiesenthal as Ruby O'Reilly, Kristopher Turner as Daniel O'Reilly, Lina Sennia as Mina Amani, Dylan Kingwell as Sam Price; Recurring characters: Sharron Matthews as Lucy LaFontaine, Michael Copeman as Liam O'Reilly, Nobahar Dadui as Ava Amani, Hannan Younis as Emily Taggart, Genevieve DeGraves as Dee Aberlard, Patrick Haye as Officer Vince Clark, Isolde Ardies as Viole O'Reilly; Guest stars: Eric Tzogas as Young Tom, Daniel Jun as Brian, Iain Stewart as Young Liam, Cru Levey and Taj Levey as Young Daniel

=== Season 3 (2023) ===
No. overall	No. in season	Title	Directed by	Written by	Original release date
21	1	"I Wish I Knew Where It Was"	Felipe Rodriguez	Mike McPhaden	September 5, 2023 (Family Channel); September 12, 2023 (byutv.org)
With her grandfathers blessing now fully in effect, Ruby is once again able to grant wishes. However the well drops a banger on the group when they learn of a brilliant bank heist where the money was never recovered that involves their teacher Mr. Ellis. What is his relation to the robbery though, and why does he wish he knew where the lost money was? Featuring: Zoe Wiesenthal as Ruby O'Reilly, Kristopher Turner as Daniel O'Reilly, Lina Sennia as Mina Amani, Dylan Kingwell as Sam Price, Paula Boudreau as Paula Price; Recurring characters: Michael Copeman as Liam O'Reilly, Robert Clarke as Mr. Ellis, Patrick Haye as Officer Vince Clark, Jani Lauzon as Halona Tl'Izilani, Kwaku Adu-Poku as Mr. Abban; Guest stars: Josette Jorge as Leah, Grant Nickalls as Nick Peters, Jenny Young as Shirley Janacek, Danilo Piljevic as Young Nick, Joanna Mandap as Mr. Abban's Fiancee, Luke Dietz as Young Ellis, Valerie Boyle as Barb
22	2	"I Wish I Could Stop This Monster"	Felipe Rodriguez	Suzanne Bolch & John May	September 12, 2023 (Family Channel); September 30, 2023 (BYUtv & byutv.org)
Ruby gets a wish that is extremely difficult to understand because it isn't a human wish. The wish comes from a dog. After doing some investigating Ruby and the crew learn the local vet, Dr. Halemani is being portrayed as a monster and he might need some help to overcome it. Meanwhile Mina gets accepted into a foreign exchange program that could send her to France. However Sam doesn't want to lose her because she's his longest friend. Featuring: Zoe Wiesenthal as Ruby O'Reilly, Kristopher Turner as Daniel O'Reilly, Lina Sennia as Mina Amani, Dylan Kingwell as Sam Price, Paula Boudreau as Paula Price; Recurring characters: Nobahar Dadui as Ava Amani, Kyle Breitkopf as Sebastian Lutes, Patrick Haye as Officer Vince Clark, Parker Lauzon as Kevin Murphy, Robert Bazzocchi as Wes Russell; Guest stars: Shaun Shetty as Dr. Halemani, Robyn Alomar as Aria, Kathryn Greenwood as Val, Nahanni Johnstone as Julia Alexa Shears
23	3	"I Wish I Could Rest in Peace"	Felipe Rodriguez	Jay Vidya	September 19, 2023 (Family Channel); September 30, 2023 (byutv.org)
Ruby gets a new wish from her ancestor, but this one could prove to be difficult since her ancestor is deceased. After talking with Sebastian, Ruby learns the wish might only be able to be fulfilled on November 2, the Day of the Dead. Meanwhile Sebastian must deal with his own problems when his dad, who is now the science teacher and points out that he needs his science project chosen by that evening. Featuring: Zoe Wiesenthal as Ruby O'Reilly, Kristopher Turner as Daniel O'Reilly, Lina Sennia as Mina Amani, Dylan Kingwell as Sam Price; Recurring characters: Kyle Breitkopf as Sebastian Lutes, Steven McCarthy as Nathan Lutes, Michael Copeman as Liam O'Reilly, Genevieve DeGraves as Dee Aberlard, Islde Ardies as Viole O'Reilly, Josette Jorge as Leah Miranda; Guest stars: Bill MacDonald as Wally Talbot, Debra McGrath as Sheila Pecham, William Jordan as Great Gambini, Pamela A. MacDonald as Customer, Maita Jackett as Evelyn Beth Cunningham
24	4	"I Wish He Knew the Whole Story"	Kristopher Turner	Suzanne Bolch, John May, & Mike McPhaden	September 26, 2023 (Family Channel); September 30, 2023 (byutv.org)
When he town library has to be closed due to some plumbing issues, the kids revert to the old community hall to figure out how to start the new wish. In it Sam begins to have big dreams about how the hall can make the city grow for youth, but Paula begins to wonder if it should instead be a historical site. Ruby quickly begins to realize the wisher is Paula herself wanting to find out stories from Sam's original family, but when they have blocked her off she's not sure how to proceed. Elsewhere Liam decides to invote Ruby's grandmother Carol for a lunch to try and put the past aside, but it could be very contingent on Ruby being present, something she's not sure she can do with the wish conflicts going on. Featuring: Zoe Wiesenthal as Ruby O'Reilly, Kristopher Turner as Daniel O'Reilly, Lina Sennia as Mina Amani, Dylan Kingwell as Sam Price, Paula Boudreau as Paula Price; Recurring characters: Michael Copeman as Liam O'Reilly, Ben Carlson as Foster Brody, Robyn Alomar as Aria, Brian Paul as Langston Pritchard, Eric Peterson as Lou Aberlard; Guest stars: Greg Ellwand as Paxton Price, Olunike Adeliyi as Henrietta Hartman, Wendy Lyon as Carol O'Reilly, Isaac Murray as Gabriel
25	5	"I Wish He was Dead"	Roney	Suzanne Bolch, John May, & Ravi Steve Khajuria	September 30, 2023 (byutv.org); October 3, 2023 (Family Channel)
After missing dinner with her grandmother, Ruby is determined to take a break from the well. When the well begins to grow more intense due to being ignored she decides to at least find out what the wish is, but when she learns it is a death wish Ruby begins to realize she may need to get others involved to gain the comfort and support she needs to not only solve wishes but also keep her own sanity intact. Featuring: Zoe Wiesenthal as Ruby O'Reilly, Kristopher Turner as Daniel O'Reilly, Lina Sennia as Mina Amani, Dylan Kingwell as Sam Price, Paula Boudreau as Paula Price; Recurring characters: Michael Copeman as Liam O'Reilly, Nobahar Dadui as Ava Amani, Patrick Haye as Officer Vince Clark, Wendy Lyon as Carol O'Reilly, Robyn Alomar as Aria, Josette Jorge as Leah Miranda, Brian Paul as Langston Pritchard, Kevin Murphy as Parker Lauzon, Isaac Murray as Gabriel; Guest stars: Riley Davis as Corey Wheeler, Jackson Doner as Rory Wheeler, Robyn Daye Edwards as Pest Control Pam
26	6	"I Wish I Could Feel Love Again"	Harvey Crossland	Rebecca Liddiard	September 30, 2023 (byutv.org); October 10, 2023 (Family Channel)
In an attempt to continue fixing the friendships the well has broken, Ruby decides to have a best friend day with Mina. When the well calls Ruby for a wish though Mina decides to go spend time with Sebastian while Ruby and Sam attempt to solve her newest wish with both of them filling that neither knows enough about love to be successful. Elsewhere Daniel attempts to help raise the funds needed to fix the old community hall. Featuring: Zoe Wiesenthal as Ruby O'Reilly, Kristopher Turner as Daniel O'Reilly, Lina Sennia as Mina Amani, Dylan Kingwell as Sam Price; Recurring characters: Kyle Breitkopf as Sebastian Lutes, Sharron Matthews as Lucy LaFontaine, Eric Peterson as Lou Aberlard, Kwaku Adu-Poku as Mr. Abban, Paul Braunstwin as Dennis Brogden; Guest stars: Richard Waugh as Tim Russell, Robert Bazzocchi as Wes Russell, Kathryn Greenwood as Val, Michael Hough as Mike LaFontaine, Patricia Casey as Mrs. Vera, Jonathan Martin as Dino Kid's Dad, Ashton Ayres as Dino Kid, Lilli Furfaro as New Mother, Gene Abella as Actor 1, Charlie Seminerio as Actor 2, Jacob Boose as Actor 3, Toby Proctor as Moving Guy Actor. (Important update: on the air date of this episode on the Family Channel, it was supposed to air on Family Channel on October 10, 2023, but when I watch it, it was season 3 episode 4, so instead Season 3 episode 6 first aired on the Family Channel on November 9, 2023, at 7pm Eastern time.)
27	7	"I Wish She Was Out of the Way"	Harvey Crossland	Suzanne Bolch, John May, & Jennifer Daley	September 30, 2023 (byutv.org); October 17, 2023 (Family Channel)
As Ruby tries to figure out how she can catch up on science, math, and English while granting wishes, she receives a wish involving archery sets and yellow paint. Ruby hopes to get through it fast, but she also worries if she doesn't do it right then nothing will be successful. Meanwhile Daniel continues to oversee the construction on the old community hall, but when he receives notice of a noise violation he must act quickly to find out who's responsible or risk having everything shut down. Featuring: Zoe Wiesenthal as Ruby O'Reilly, Kristopher Turner as Daniel O'Reilly, Lina Sennia as Mina Amani, Dylan Kingwell as Sam Price; Recurring characters: Steven McCarthy as Nathan Lutes, Josette Jorge as Leah Miranda, Robyn Alomar as Aria, Jani Lauzon as Halona TL'Izilani, Sharron Matthews as Lucy LaFontaine, Nobahar Dadui as Ava Amani, Parker Lauzon as Kevin Murphy; Guest stars: Liam MacDonald as Ronan, Jayne Eastwood as Ms. Grady
28	8	"I Wish I Was the Next Well Keeper"	Harvey Crossland	Suzanne Bolch & John May	September 30, 2023 (byutv.org); October 24, 2023 (Family Channel)
Ruby and Daniel prepare for a month long trip to Ireland to learn more about family history. However Ruby decides she should check with the well first and make sure there's no urgent wishes. As she does so, she gets a wish she never expected to hear. Someone else wishes they were the new well keeper. Has Ruby truly been fired, or is there something else hidden within the wish Ruby doesn't realize? Meanwhile Sebastian begins to wonder why Mina is always hanging out with Ruby and Sam and starts to investigate their history, but in the process he could destroy Mina's trust of him in everything. Featuring: Zoe Wiesenthal as Ruby O'Reilly, Kristopher Turner as Daniel O'Reilly, Lina Sennia as Mina Amani, Dylan Kingwell as Sam Price; Recurring characters: Josette Jorge as Leah Miranda, Nobahar Dadui as Ava Amani, Kyle Breitkopf as Sebastian Lutes, Steven McCarthy as Nathan Lutes, Parker Lauzon as Kevin Murphy; Guest stars: Michael Riley as Tom O'Reilly, Chloe Avakian as Lynn Callaghan, Neil Whitely as Dr. Snyder, Mairi Babb as Rosalind Callaghan, Jenny Young as Shirley Janacek, Lorna Rose Harris as Beth Callaghan, Audrina Durante and Isla Durante as Hannah Eloise Callaghan

=== Season 4 (2024) ===
No. overall	No. in season	Title	Directed by	Written by	Original release date
29	1	"I Wish... I Wish... I Wish..."	Felipe Rodriguez	Suzanne Bolch & John May	September 8, 2024 (byutv.org); September 9, 2024 (Family Channel)
Ruby returns from Ireland with a bunch of new information on wishing wells and the knowledge that some get overrun and shutdown. She's determined to keep her well operational and starts calling it Steve. However trouble quickly begins brewing when Ruby learns the newest wish is actually wishes, and she has 3 to grant at once. Featuring: Zoe Wiesenthal as Ruby O'Reilly, Kristopher Turner as Daniel O'Reilly, Lina Sennia as Mina Amani, Dylan Kingwell as Sam Price; Recurring characters: Paula Boudreau as Paula Price, Kyle Breitkopf as Sebastian Lutes, Parker Lauzon as Kevin Murphy, Sharron Matthews as Lucy LaFontaine, Josette Jorge as Leah Miranda, and Isaac Murray as Gabriel Snyder; Guest stars: Nadine Whiteman as Mrs. Rivers-Snyder, Deborah Tennant as Mrs. Pritchard, Ardon Bess as Mr. Rivers, Jayd Deroché as Jelani Snyder, Matt Lenehan as Finn and Aldrin Bundoc as Cris Miranda.
30	2	"I Wish I Could Land a Sweet Deal"	Felipe Rodriguez	Mike McPhaden	September 8, 2024 (byutv.org); September 16, 2024 (Family Channel)
Amanda Wilczek has her wish on landing a sweet deal come up to the gang, but the group wonders if there's perhaps more hidden to her wish when she decides to sale an ancient house and land to a major development company rather than helping out a family in need. Meanwhile Daniel begins getting pitches to join the volunteer fire department which brings old desires he's had back to his mind. Featuring: Zoe Wiesenthal as Ruby O'Reilly, Kristopher Turner as Daniel O'Reilly, Lina Sennia as Mina Amani, Dylan Kingwell as Sam Price; Recurring characters: Parker Lauzon as Kevin Murphy, Sharron Matthews as Lucy LaFontaine, Jani Lauzon as Halona Tl'zilani; Guest stars: Angela Asher as Amanda Wilczek, Joan Gregson as Mrs. Martin, and Stephanie Ng Wan as Young Woman.
31	3	"I Wish I Was a Kid Again"	Ruba Nadda	Taylor Anisette & Nathalie Younglai	September 8, 2024 (byutv.org)
Ruby gets one of her strangest wishes to date when she gets a wish from a kid who wants to be a kid again. The wish awakens her to the persecution that some races feel for being different and teaches her that even when areas have been ok'd for certain projects, you cannot always take it upon yourself to make the project be fulfilled. Additionally her and her friends begin to realize that there will always be those who are persecuted for appearing different even though they should all be treated the same. Featuring: Zoe Wiesenthal as Ruby O'Reilly, Kristopher Turner as Daniel O'Reilly, Lina Sennia as Mina Amani, Dylan Kingwell as Sam Price; Recurring characters: Jani Lauzon as Halona Tl'zilani, Isaac Murray as Gabriel Snyder, Jayd Deroché as Jelani Snyder, Matt Lenehan as Finn, Jayne Eastwood as Ms. Grady, Rebecca Liddiard as Brea Cochrane, Brian Paul as Langston Pritchard, Neil Whitely as Dr. Snyder, Jinny Wong as Millie, Gabriel Darku as Peter Evers; Guest stars: Sean Cullen as Mr. Brooks.
32	4	"I Wish I Knew What She Was Hiding"	Ruba Nadda	Jennifer Daley	September 8, 2024 (byutv.org)
Ruby's newest wish comes with some disturbing information. Ruby learns that someone has videoed her and the next well keeper before she went on vacation to Ireland. Now Ruby is worried that the well's secret will be exposed and cause it to dry up unless she can find out who the wisher is and keep that video from going public at all costs. Featuring: Zoe Wiesenthal as Ruby O'Reilly, Kristopher Turner as Daniel O'Reilly, Lina Sennia as Mina Amani, Dylan Kingwell as Sam Price; Recurring characters: Kyle Breitkopf as Sebastian Lutes, Parker Lauzon as Kevin Murphy, Nadine Whiteman as Mrs. Rivers-Snyder, Rebecca Liddiard as Brea Cochrane, Joan Gregson as Mrs. Martin, Matt Lenehan as Finn, Daniel Jun as Brian; Guest stars: Lynne Griffin as Gramma Murphy, Marcus Cornwall as Bakari
33	5	"Ecnahc Rehtona Dah I Hsiw I"	Michelle Latimer	Suzanne Bolch & John May	September 8, 2024 (byutv.org)
Ruby learns that one of the reasons why magic well stop working is because they are forced to give cryptic clues no one is able to solve after they are revealed. At first she has no fear that this will happen, but she doesn't know that Amanda Wilczek has decided to run a new town slogan advertising them as the town where wishes come true. Will this lead to her well going haywire, or is there more to the meaning of a jarbled wish that Ruby gets simultaneously? Featuring: Zoe Wiesenthal as Ruby O'Reilly, Kristopher Turner as Daniel O'Reilly, Lina Sennia as Mina Amani, Dylan Kingwell as Sam Price; Recurring characters: Gabriel Darku as Peter Evers, Kyle Breitkopf as Sebastian Lutes, Angela Asher as Amanda Wilczek, Nobahar Dadui as Ava Amani, Matt Lenehan as Finn, Kwaku Adu-Poku as Mr. Abban, Daniel Jun as Brian; Guest star: Ana Sani as Tessa
34	6	"I Wish Tom Didn't Ruin Everything"	Michelle Latimer	Suzanne Bolch & John May	September 8, 2024 (byutv.org)
As Emerald prepares to celebrate Thanksgiving Ruby is given her toughest wish to date, All Ruby hears is the wish- I Wish Tom Didn't Ruin Everything, as well as seeing one cooking pan. She assumes this must refer to Tom but is unable to find any new clues until the group is led to Aberlard's looking for possible antiques. Could the wish be unable to solve because of who is involved, or will the trio find one clue that helps them search for the answer? Featuring: Zoe Wiesenthal as Ruby O'Reilly, Kristopher Turner as Daniel O'Reilly, Lina Sennia as Mina Amani, Dylan Kingwell as Sam Price; Recurring characters: Eric Peterson as Lou Aberlard, Paula Boudreau as Paula Price, Kathryn Greenwood as Val, Rebecca Liddiard as Brea Cochrane, Robyn Alomar as Aria, Jani Lauzon as Halona Tl'zilani, Brian Paul as Langston Pritchard, Jayne Eastwood as Ms. Grady; Guest stars: Bill McDonald as Wally Talbot, Debra McGrath as Sheila Pecham, Ellie Ellwand as Young Freda Grady, Jack Petherick as Young Lou Aberlard
35	7	"I Wish I Wouldn't Lose"	Harvey Crossland	Nathalie Younglai	September 8, 2024 (byutv.org)
The well continues to malfunction as it slowly is becoming disenchanted when Ruby gets a wish that's 2 parts. The wish has the desire of one individual not to lose while another hopes he can lose so that he can get his health in check. Is there any possible way that the two wishes can be fulfilled without causing harm to the others, or is this a wish destined to fail? Featuring: Zoe Wiesenthal as Ruby O'Reilly, Kristopher Turner as Daniel O'Reilly, Lina Sennia as Mina Amani, Dylan Kingwell as Sam Price; Recurring characters: Kevin Murphy as Parker Lauzon, Rebecca Liddiard as Brea Cochrane, Nadine Whiteman as Mrs. Rivers-Snyder, Marcus Cornwall as Bakari, Jayd Deroché as Jelani Snyder, Neil Whitely as Dr. Snyder, Matt Lenehan as Finn; Guest stars: Dmitry Chepovetsky as Coach Collins, Yuvi Randhawa as Bannerji, Jimmy Omino as Gibson, Rachel Cantni as Annalise Maracle, Keris Hope Hill as Megis
36	8	"I Wish..."	Harvey Crossland	Suzanne Bolch, John May, & Mike McPhaden	September 8, 2024 (byutv.org)
In this finale, Ruby is faced with a wish that could change everything forever. Daniel accidentally wishes that he could reveal the truth of the well, and it comes right as Mrs. Rivers-Snyder is about to publish her book. Publishing the truth about the well could cause it to overflow and shutdown forever. Not fulfilling the wish could plummet the town of Emerald back into the dark days of when Tom refused to grant a wish. Luckily Ruby isn't alone. With the help of her friends and her boyfriend, well researcher Finn, the answer may just come that'll keep Emerald safe forever. Featuring: Zoe Wiesenthal as Ruby O'Reilly, Kristopher Turner as Daniel O'Reilly, Lina Sennia as Mina Amani, Dylan Kingwell as Sam Price; Recurring characters: Paula Boudreau as Paula Price, Sharron Matthews as Lucy LaFontaine, Nadine Whiteman as Mrs. Rivers-Snyder, Rebecca Liddiard as Brea Cochrane, Kyle Breitkopf as Sebastian Lutes, Isaac Murray as Gabriel Snyder, Ana Sani as Tessa Evers, Matt Lenehan as Finn, Lorna Rose Harris as Beth Callaghan

== Production ==
Ruby and the Well is filmed in Toronto, Ontario, Canada and is produced by WildBrain Studios and Shaftesbury Films. They have also used locations nearby such as Ancaster and Cambridge.

Seasons 1 and 2 both contain ten episodes, with season 2 having been picked up before season 1 even debuted. On May 2, 2023, it was announced that the show had been renewed for season 3 on the show's Instagram page. On August 9, the show's Instagram page announced season 3 would premiere on BYUtv on September 30. On September 9, 2023, BYUtv officially announced that Ruby and the Well had been renewed for a fourth and final season. The filming took place in Toronto, Ontario. In August 2024, BYUtv began playing video clips showing the new season, which premiered on September 8, 2024. As with seasons 2 and 3, it was made available first through the App and website. Episodes premiered on Family Channel weekly from September 9 to October 28, 2024.

== Release ==
In the United States, the show appears on BYUtv and is streamed at byutv.org and on the BYUtv App. In Canada the show airs on Family Channel and can be streamed on the FamilyTV channel on Prime Video. In New Zealand the series airs on TVNZ and is streamed on TVNZ+.

== Accolades ==
Year	Award	Category	Nominee(s)	Result	Ref.
2023	Canadian Screen Awards	Original Music, Drama	Lora Bidner, Robert Carli	Nominated	
2023	Canadian Screen Music Awards	Original Score, Dramatic Series or Special	Lora Bidner, Robert Carli	Nominated	
2022	Canadian Screen Music Awards	Original Main Title Theme Music	Lora Bidner, Robert Carli	Nominated	
2022	Children's and Family Emmy Awards	Music Direction and Composition for a Live Action Program	Lora Bidner, Robert Carli, Kyle Merkley	Nominated	
2023	Directors Guild of Canada	Directorial Achievement	Felipe Rodriguez	Nominated	
2022	Directors Guild of Canada	Directorial Achievement	Felipe Rodriguez	Nominated	
2023	Television Business International Content Innovation Awards	Live Action Kids Drama	N/A	Won	
2023	Television Business International Content Innovation Awards	Kinds Launch of the Year	N/A	Won	

== Mythos ==
The power of the wishing well is based on Irish culture histories. Dating from pre-Christian times, these Irish holy wells were blessed after St. Patrick evangelized the island of Ireland. Many of these wells were later associated with saints, the most common being Patrick, Brigid of Kildare, and Ann, the mother of Mary.

These wells were not wells in which money was thrown in and wishes made. Instead they were wells where the water was believed to have healing powers and that the Saints would use to bless others and perform miracles. The visions Ruby receives from the well serve the same purpose: blessing others and allowing miracles to occur.
