= Joshua Glenn =

American writer and semiotician

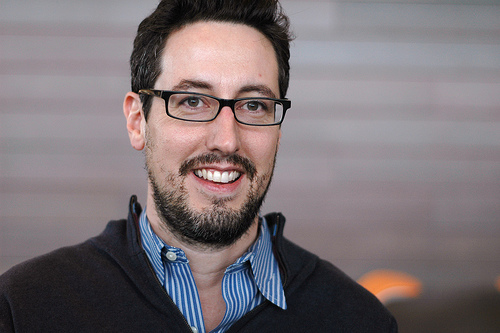
- Born: October 6, 1967 (age 59); Boston, Massachusetts, U.S.
- Occupations: Author, semiotician
- Website: HiLoBrow

Joshua Glenn (born October 6, 1967) is an American writer, editor, and semiotics analyst. He is the cofounder of the websites HiLobrow, Significant Objects, and Semionaut. In the 1990s he published the zine Hermenaut.

== Early life and education ==
Glenn was born and raised in Boston's Jamaica Plain neighborhood. He attended Boston Latin School and Williams College. He earned a Master's in Teaching from Boston University in 1993. He is married and has two children.

== Hermenaut ==
From 1992 through 2001 Glenn was publisher and coeditor of Hermenaut, a philosophy and cultural criticism periodical, described as "a zine that gives voice to indie intellectual thought... a scholarly journal minus the university, a sounding board for thinking folk who operate outside the ivory tower".

Glenn wrote a feature in each issue on a single "hermenaut" (or "outsider intellectual") including Theodor W. Adorno, Philip K. Dick, Bruce Lee, Oscar Wilde, Abbie Hoffman, and Simone Weil. From 2000 to 2001, Glenn published and coedited the online journal Hermenaut.com and hosted its online salon, the Wicked Pavilion.

His zine collection, including a full run of Hermenaut, is held by the University of Iowa libraries.

== Online community projects ==
From 1994 through 1996, Glenn was an editor at the Utne Reader. During that time, he served as a judge for the Independent Press Awards. He hosted online salons for Utne Reader, and contributed a chapter to the book Salons: The Joy of Conversation.

Glenn was editorial director of the start-up Web business Tripod.com from 1996 through 1998. The company provided user-friendly tools for online publishing, aggregated communities of interest, and published "streetsmart strategies for work, life, and everything else." When the TV newsmagazine Nightline did an episode on Tripod, Glenn pranked the show's producers by making up digital newspeak "Let's get FTP connectivity hyped up to the hilt. Let's get the synergies ramping with the daily rocket." When Tripod was acquired by Lycos in 2000, Glenn left to publish Hermenaut full-time.

Glenn worked at the Boston Globe's weekly Ideas section as an associate editor and columnist. From 2006 through 2008, Glenn wrote the Brainiac blog for the Boston Globe's Ideas section. On January 31, 2007, he scooped the Globe's coverage of the Mooninite attack on Boston. Glenn was also a contributing editor to the website Feed and wrote for The Baffler, The Idler and n+1.

== Semiotic explorations ==
In 2007, Glenn coedited Taking Things Seriously, a collection of 75 photos of and essays about objects of "unexpected significance", which made Entertainment Weekly's "Must List" in October 2007. Glenn has referred to the book as "a long-delayed issue of Hermenaut." In 2008, Glenn wrote The Idler's Glossary. Glenn and bookfuturist Matthew Battles launched the intellectual-cultural blog HiLobrow, named by TIME magazine one of the Best Blogs of 2010. Glenn's ongoing research at HiLobrow includes a scheme to "reperiodize America's generations", as well as an analysis of science fiction published from 1904-1933 — an era Glenn has named science fiction's "Radium Age." Glenn has also written for the Washington Post, the New York Times Book Review, Slate, Cabinet, and the science-fiction blog io9.

In July 2009, Glenn and Rob Walker launched the Significant Objects project, whose goal was to test the hypothesis "Stories are such a powerful driver of emotional value that their effect on any given object's subjective value can actually be measured objectively." Glenn and Walker bought objects at thrift stores and yard sales, recruited one hundred authors — including Jonathan Lethem, Lydia Millet, Nicholson Baker, Colson Whitehead, and William Gibson — to write stories about those objects, then sold the objects on eBay, using the stories as item descriptions. The Guardian's Aditya Chakrabortty called the project "one of the most life-affirmingly cheeky studies I have seen for ages." The project resulted in $128.74 worth of objects being sold for $3,612.51. Two subsequent volumes of Significant Objects stories raised funds for the tutoring programs 826 National and Girls Write Now. Fantagraphics published a collection of Significant Objects stories in 2011. In 2022, Hat & Beard Press announced a forthcoming book Lost Objects: 50 Stories About the Things We Miss and Why They Matter by Glenn and Walker.

Glenn and Malcolm Evans, a British semiotician, launched Semionaut in 2010, an international website about semiotic cultural and brand analysis, with contributors from Brazil, China, Germany, India, Japan, Russia and Saudi Arabia. In 2011, Glenn and Mark Kingwell published The Wage Slave's Glossary, which "looks at the language we use to make sense of the interconnected world of work and leisure." In 2021, McGill-Queen’s University Press published a third book in the series, The Adventurer’s Glossary written by Glenn and Mark Kingwell, with illustrations by Seth.

== UNBORED ==
In 2012, Bloomsbury published Joshua Glenn and Elizabeth Foy Larsen's family activities guide UNBORED: The Essential Field Guide to Serious Fun. "Fighting the war against techno-passivity, it reads like an old-fashioned child's activity book for a modern Gen-X parented family." It was followed up with their family activities guide UNBORED Games: Serious Fun for Everyone in 2014 and UNBORED ADVENTURE in 2015. The project spun off several activity kits including the UNBORED: Time Capsule which received Dr Toy's 100 Best award.

== Radium Age SF ==
Glenn describes the Radium Age as "a sort of proto-science fiction... a genre that was still getting its feet and finding its way in the dark that didn't quite have solidified boundaries that would later define science fiction." In 2012 Glenn and Hilobrow co-editor Matthew Battles printed a series of public domain Radium Age titles beginning in 2012 on their own imprint HiLo Books. These included works by authors not normally thought to be science fiction authors--Jack London's The Scarlet Plague and Rudyard Kipling's With the Night Mail.

In 2022 MIT Press invited Glenn to edit a new series exploring the Radium Age and its significance, bringing ten other titles from the Radium Age back into print. The initial run includes lesser-known novels by Arthur Conan Doyle and H. G. Wells as well as a collection of shorter fiction titled Voices from the Radium Age

== Published works ==
- Glenn, Joshua (2022). Voices from the Radium Age. MIT Press. p. 220. ISBN 9780262543378.
- Glenn, Joshua; Kingwell, Mark (2021). The Adventurer's Glossary. McGill-Queen’s University Press. p. 325. ISBN 9780228008316.
- Glenn, Joshua; Larsen, Elizabeth Foy (2015). UNBORED Adventure: 70 Seriously Fun Activities For Kids And Their Families. Bloomsbury. p. 176. ISBN 9781632860965.
- Glenn, Joshua; Larsen, Elizabeth Foy (2014). UNBORED Games: Serious Fun for Everyone. Bloomsbury. p. 176. ISBN 978-1620407066.
- Glenn, Joshua; Walker, Rob (2012). Significant Objects. Fantagraphics. p. 232. ISBN 9781606995259.
- Glenn, Joshua; Larsen, Elizabeth Foy (2012). UNBORED: The Essential Field Guide to Serious Fun. Bloomsbury. p. 352. ISBN 978-1608196418.
- Glenn, Joshua (2011). The Wage Slave's Glossary. Biblioasis. p. 136. ISBN 978-1926845173.
- Glenn, Joshua (2008). The Idler's Glossary. Biblioasis. p. 136. ISBN 978-1-897231-46-3.
- Glenn, Joshua; Hayes, Carol (2007). Taking Things Seriously: 75 Objects with Unexpected Significance. Princeton Architectural Press. p. 176. ISBN 978-1-56898-690-6.
