= Sharron Matthews =

Canadian actress

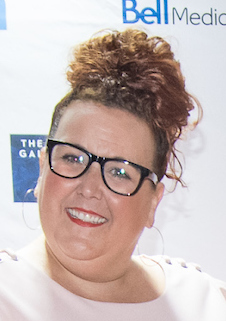
Sharron Matthews

Sharron Matthews is a Canadian actress. She is most noted for her regular role as Flo Chakowitz in the television series Frankie Drake Mysteries, for which she received Canadian Screen Award nominations for Best Supporting Actress in a Drama Series at the 7th Canadian Screen Awards in 2019 and the 9th Canadian Screen Awards in 2021.

== Career ==
Matthews is predominantly a stage actress, most notably touring her own one-woman cabaret show Girl Crush in 2017. In 2021 Matthews had her first credit as a television writer, cowriting the Frankie Drake Mysteries episode "Life Is a Cabaret".

== Personal life ==
A native of Hamilton, Ontario, she was married to musical theatre actor George Masswohl, but they are divorced.

== Filmography ==
=== Film ===
Year	Title	Role	Notes
2004	Mean Girls	Joan the Secretary	
2005	Cinderella Man	Lady	
2006	Take the Lead	Ms. Rosemead	
2007	Hairspray	Mr. Pinky's Cashier	
2008	Camille	Paramedic	
2017	The Curse of Buckout Road	Officer Cheryl Kellog	
2024	Mother Father Sister Brother Frank	Ronda	

=== Television ===
Year	Title	Role	Notes
1990	T. and T.	Telegram Singer	Episode: "The Little Prince"
2000	The Last Debate	Barbara Fan	Television film
2001	I Was a Rat	Barmaid	3 episodes
2001–2002	Pecola	Voice	12 episodes
2003	Street Time	Waitress	Episode: "Born to Kill"
2004	Doc	Susie Logan	Episode: "Daddy Dearest"
2004	Sue Thomas: F.B.Eye	Socialite	Episode: "The New Mafia"
2007	Love You to Death	Receptionist	Episode: "A Christmas Murder"
2010 & 2022	Murdoch Mysteries	Miss Williams/TBA	Episodes: "Rich Boy, Poor Boy" & "Clean Hands"
2011	She's the Mayor	Daphne	2 episodes
2014, 2016	Odd Squad	Chef Sylvia	2 episodes
2017	Taken	Marcy	Episode: "I Surrender"
2017–2020	Frankie Drake Mysteries	Flo Chakowitz	38 episodes
2019	Tokens	Director #2	3 episodes
2020	Hudson & Rex	Sharon Lightwood	Episode: "Flare of the Dog"
2022	Ruby and the Well	Lucy LaFontaine	5 episodes
2022	Mary and Flo on the Go	Flo	9 episodes
2022	Five Days at Memorial	Cheri Landry	8 episodes
