= Kristopher Turner =

Canadian actor (born 1980)

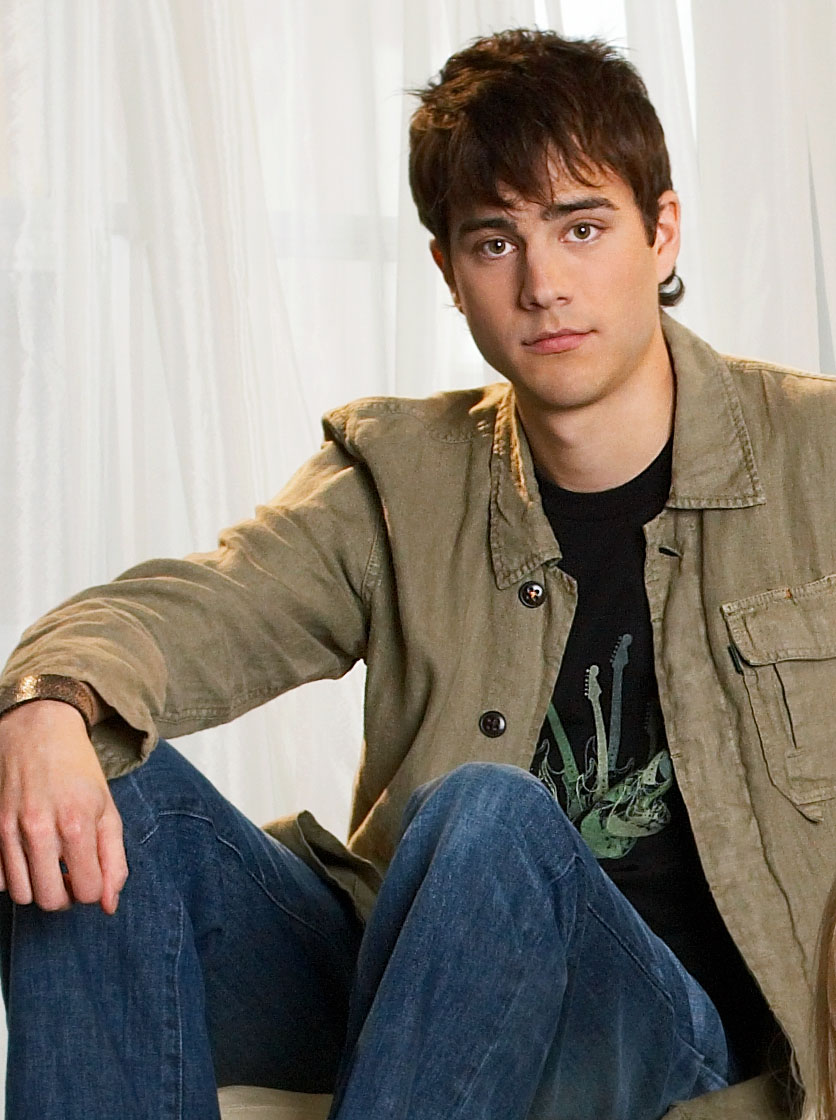
- Turner on Instant Star in 2008
- Born: September 27, 1980 (age 46); Winnipeg, Manitoba, Canada
- Occupation: Actor
- Years active: 2002–present
- Website: kristopherturner.com

Kristopher Turner (born September 27, 1980) is a Canadian actor, producer and director. He is best known for his role as Dr. Gavin Murphy on the medical drama series Saving Hope, and as Jamie Andrews on the CTV teen drama Instant Star.

== Early life ==
Turner was born and raised in Winnipeg, Manitoba, Canada. He was introduced to the theater by his grandmother. Turner starred in his high school production of A Midsummer Night's Dream. Turner received a degree in theatre from the University of Winnipeg. He was active in a number of theatre productions including In Gabriel's Kitchen and That Face.

== Career ==
In 2002, Turner landed a role in the children's series 2030 CE. He was cast in the lead role as Lex in director David DeCoteau's 2003 film The Brotherhood III: Young Demons. Following Turner's success in that film, he was cast in another leading role as Gus in the MTV movie Everybody's Doing It. Turner return to the theatre and appeared in a local Winnipeg theatrical production of Athol Fugard's Master Harold and the Boys. In 2004, Turner was cast as Jamie Andrews in the CTV teen drama series Instant Star, in which he stars for four seasons. He appeared in TV series Dark Oracle and in TV movie An Old Fashioned Thanksgiving. In 2007, he received a Gemini Awards nomination for Best Performance by an Actor in a Leading Role in a Dramatic Program or Mini-Series, for his role as Matt Blessing in A Dad for Christmas.

After Instant Star, Turner appeared in the 2010 miniseries Bloodletting and Miraculous Cures as Winston and received another Gemini Awards nomination for Best Performance by an Actor in a Featured Supporting Role in a Dramatic Program or Mini-Series. He guest starred on Rookie Blue, The Listener, and Lost Girl. In 2012, he was cast as Cam on the series The L.A. Complex and at the same time joining the medical drama series Saving Hope as Dr. Gavin Murphy. Turner starred in the 2012 comedy horror film A Little Bit Zombie. In 2014, Turner played Eric in the Hallmark movie Love by the Book. He has appeared in stage performance in the play This is Our Youth, and received a Dora Award nomination for his role in Two Weeks, Twice a Year. In 2015, Turner was cast in the CBC drama series This Life as Oliver Lawson.

Turner currently lives and studies in Toronto and Los Angeles.

== Filmography ==
=== Film ===
Year	Title	Role
2003	The Brotherhood III: Young Demons	Lex
2006	The King of Siam	Gary
2009	Without a Paddle: Nature's Calling	Zach
2009	A Wake	Chad
2010	The Triumph of Dingus McGraw: Village Idiot	Dingus McGraw
2012	A Little Bit Zombie	Steve
2013	Best, April	Alex
2013	Issues	David Hunter
2014	Cold Feet	Andy
2014	The Idiot	Dingus
2015	Wingman Inc.	Bobby
2015	Timber	Corey
2020	Flowers of the Field	Tom Jarvis

=== Television ===
Year	Title	Role	Notes
2002	2030 CE	Chief Trainer	3 episodes
2002	Fancy, Fancy Being Rich	Drowned Man	TV short
2002	Everybody's Doing It	Gus	TV movie
2004	Renegadepress.com	Zeke	3 episodes
2004	Instant Star	Jamie Andrews	52 episodes
2005–2006	Dark Oracle	Omen	5 episodes
2006	Degrassi: Minis	Jamie Andrews	Episode: "I'm a Degrassi, I'm an Instant Star"
2006	A Dad for Christmas	Matt Blessing	TV movie Nominated—Gemini Awards for Best Performance by an Actor in a Leading Role in a Dramatic Program or Mini-Series (2007)
2007	The Ultimate Sin	Jamie	TV movie
2007	In God's Country	Jamie Coyle	TV movie
2008	An Old Fashioned Thanksgiving	Gad Hopkins	TV movie
2009	Murdoch Mysteries	Sam Fineman	Episode: "Let Us Ask the Maiden"
2010	Bloodletting & Miraculous Cures	Winston	TV mini-series Nominated—Gemini Awards for Best Performance by an Actor in a Featured Supporting Role in a Dramatic Program or Mini-Series (2010)
2010	Being Erica	Jordan	Episode: "Two Wrongs"
2010	An Old Fashioned Christmas	Gad	TV movie
2011	Rookie Blue	Daniel Baird	Episode: "Bad Moon Rising"
2011	Lost Girl	Russell	Episode: "Can't See the Fae-Rest"
2011	The Listener	Gregory Harrow	2 episodes
2012	The L.A. Complex	Cam	18 episodes
2012	Beauty and the Beast	Mechanic	Episode: "Cold Turkey"
2014–2014	Saving Hope	Dr. Gavin Murphy	34 episodes
2013	Off2Kali Comedy	Jude	Episode: "Small Talk Denial"
2014	Love by the Book	Eric	TV movie
2015	First Response	Gerry	TV movie
2015	This Life	Oliver Lawson	18 Episodes
2017	Murdoch Mysteries	Jack Borden	Episode: "Dr. Osler Regrets"
2021	You May Kiss the Bridesmaid	Liam	TV movie
2022–2024	Ruby and the Well	Daniel O'Reilly	Main role; Also associate producer and director
2024	Brilliant Minds	Kevin Sullivan	Episode: "The Lovesick Widow"
