= NCIS season 18 =

Season of television series

NCIS
- Season 18
- Season 18 U.S. DVD cover
- Starring: Mark Harmon; Sean Murray; Wilmer Valderrama; Emily Wickersham; Maria Bello; Brian Dietzen; Diona Reasonover; Rocky Carroll; David McCallum
- No. of episodes: 16

Release
- Original network: CBS
- Original release: November 17, 2020 – May 25, 2021

Season chronology
- ← Previous; Season 17 Next → Season 19

The eighteenth season of NCIS, an American police procedural drama television series, originally aired on CBS from November 17, 2020, through May 25, 2021. The season only contained 16 episodes, shortened due to the COVID-19 pandemic in the United States, making it the second shortest in the series behind season 21, and includes the series' 400th episode. This is the first season to not premiere in the usual September. The season was produced by Belisarius Productions and CBS Studios.

NCIS revolves around a fictional team of special agents from the Naval Criminal Investigative Service, which conducts criminal investigations involving the U.S. Navy and Marine Corps. The series stars Mark Harmon, Sean Murray, Wilmer Valderrama, Emily Wickersham, Maria Bello, Brian Dietzen, Diona Reasonover, Rocky Carroll, and David McCallum. The season is Bello's last as a series regular, as she left after eight episodes. The season finale serves as Wickersham's final series regular appearance as Eleanor Bishop, leaving the series after 8 years. Several late-season episodes feature Pam Dawber, Harmon's real-life spouse.

== Cast and characters ==
=== Main ===
- Mark Harmon as Leroy Jethro Gibbs, NCIS Supervisory Special Agent (SSA) of the Major Case Response Team (MCRT) assigned to Washington's Navy Yard (episodes 1–10)/suspended (episodes 11–16)
- Sean Murray as Timothy McGee, NCIS Senior Special Agent, Second in Command of MCRT
- Wilmer Valderrama as Nick Torres, NCIS Special Agent
- Emily Wickersham as Eleanor "Ellie" Bishop, NCIS Special Agent
- Maria Bello as Dr. Jacqueline "Jack" Sloane, NCIS Senior Resident Agent and Operational Psychologist (episodes 1–8)
- Brian Dietzen as Dr. Jimmy Palmer, Chief Medical Examiner for NCIS
- Diona Reasonover as Kasie Hines, Forensic Specialist for NCIS
- Rocky Carroll as Leon Vance, NCIS Director
- David McCallum as Dr. Donald "Ducky" Mallard, NCIS Historian and former Chief Medical Examiner

=== Recurring ===
- Joe Spano as Tobias Fornell, Private Detective and former FBI agent
- Margo Harshman as Delilah Fielding-McGee, DoD Intelligence Analyst and McGee's wife
- Pam Dawber as Marcie Warren, investigative journalist
- Laura San Giacomo as Dr. Grace Confalone, psychotherapist
- Nick Boraine as Merriweather, NCIS target
- Adam Campbell as Young Ducky
- Sean Harmon as Young Gibbs
- Hugo Armstrong as Eugene Coyle, from the NCIS Inspector General's office
- Juliette Angelo as Emily Fornell, Tobias Fornell's daughter
- Elayn J. Taylor as Odette Malone, owner of Ziva's private office and former CIA Operative
- Victoria Platt as Veronica Tyler, NCIS Special Agent
- Jack Fisher as Phineas, Gibbs' former neighbor
- Karri Turner as Micki Kaydar, Phineas' aunt

=== Guest stars ===
- Thomas F. Wilson as Angus DeMint, author "Journey of Adventure."
- Steven Bauer as Miguel Torres, Nick Torres' father
- William Allen Young as Moses McClaine, U.S. Secretary of Defense
- Zane Holtz as Dale Sawyer, NCIS Special Agent
- Tijuana Ricks as Pamela Walsh, CIA Agent
- Chris Browning as Tom Dalton, NCIS REACT Special Agent
- Katrina Law as Jessica Knight, NCIS REACT Special Agent

== Episodes ==
No. overall	No. in season	Title	Directed by	Written by	Original release date	Prod. code	U.S. viewers (millions)
399	1	"Sturgeon Season"	Michael Zinberg	Scott Williams	November 17, 2020	1801	10.35
While the team tries to figure out the whereabouts of a missing body, Gibbs assists Fornell in tracking down the leader of the drug ring that supplied opioids to Fornell's daughter Emily.
400	2	"Everything Starts Somewhere"	Terrence O'Hara	Steven D. Binder	November 24, 2020	1802	10.15
The discovery of a dead body in the basement of NCIS headquarters is linked to a group Gibbs investigated in his past. Flashbacks reveal how Gibbs was introduced to Ducky and the agency. The episode ends with Gibbs accepting invitations from the team to go out for drinks.
401	3	"Blood and Treasure"	Diana Valentine	Christopher J. Waild	December 8, 2020	1803	8.53
A murder investigation is linked to a years-long treasure hunt. The team investigates while recovering from their night of drinking. Also, Gibbs and Fornell continue their secret investigation into the drug ring, with Fornell going undercover as a fast food restaurant employee.
402	4	"Sunburn"	Rocky Carroll	Marco Schnabel	January 19, 2021	1804	9.63
icon
403	5	"Head of the Snake"	Tawnia McKiernan	Brendan Fehily & David J. North	January 19, 2021	1805	8.74
icon
404	6	"1mm"	Diana Valentine	Gina Lucita Monreal	January 26, 2021	1806	10.02
icon
405	7	"The First Day"	James Whitmore Jr.	Margaret Rose Lester	February 9, 2021	1807	9.74
When towtruck driver Shelby Roberts finds the wrong car, she discovers the driver, PO2 David Avila, is dead, and the passenger, ex-con Luis Carter, is on the run. McGee finds they were in the First Day program, which Miss Nellie explains helps ex-cons reenter society. Corey Jackson tells the team about Avila’s reentry contact book, from which Torres finds ex-con-run businesses, such as Marcus' barbershop, where he and Bishop detain Carter, who denies contracting Avila's gang hit. Gibbs, "shows up" for Carter, gains his trust and learns "Lincoln Street Saints, Princesa" is what the shooter shouted, believing Carter was the target, not Avila. Torres takes Carter into protective custody. The team learns Carter was calling his daughter Carmen from prison, not a lawyer. Saints informant Drea claims the only reason they would go after Carter is to cut out competition for ghost guns. Palmer discovers Avila had Saints tattoos, including "Princesa," removed before basic training, making Avila the target. They interrogate Jackson, who says Avila fought with Marcus. Carter recalls gun parts at the barbershop, leading NCIS to arrest Marcus. Meanwhile, Gibbs helps Palmer, who struggles after losing his wife Breena to COVID-19. Also, Sloan considers leaving NCIS.
406	8	"True Believer"	Terrence O'Hara	Jill Weinberger	March 2, 2021	1808	9.60
In the Helmand Province, Afghanistan Tahir and Farokh find "Sloane NCIS" written inside an abandoned school bus. NCIS-SA Eric Freeman reports four ten year-old girls and their chaperone Darya hijacked by the Taliban. Vance sends Gibbs and Sloane to find them, while NCIS investigates the death of hacktivist Albert "Albatross" Gorsch, who sent GPS coordinates to the kidnappers. Kasie and Palmer discover kidney failure by acetic acid-laced ketchup, indicating murder. Nabi informs, Gorsch designed the NGO Moroor Amen (Safe Passage) network. Reunited with her mother, Yazmin was let go for having epilepsy and the kidnappers auction the rest online. Ben Mitchell "helps" McGee crack Gorsch's encryption, which unleashes a network-crippling virus. Sloane learns Darya changed her bus route, suspiciously. Palmer poses as a whistleblower to capture hacktivist Samantha Watkins, to prove she is one of the "good guys." She believes Gorsch was set up. Darya is killed with the warning, "Go home or there will be more blood." Exacerbated, Sloane quits, "I'm out. I'm done!" Finding Mitchell's prints on the ketchup, he names Nabi, whom Sloane pressures to rescue the girls. Sloane stays behind to "make a difference here," quitting NCIS and sharing a goodbye kiss with Gibbs. Cast: This is the final appearance of Maria Bello as Dr. Jacqueline "Jack" Sloane.
407	9	"Winter Chill"	Michael Zinberg	Scott Williams	March 9, 2021	1809	9.77
When a Navy Officer is found dead in a freezer truck, the team get stuck in the middle of a battle between two competing food trucks. Meanwhile, after Sloane's departure from NCIS, Gibbs comforts Fornell when his daughter Emily unexpectedly dies from a drug relapse.
408	10	"Watchdog"	Diana Valentine	Brendan Fehily & David J. North	March 16, 2021	1810	9.98
Navy PO3s Ed Thomas and Carlos Garcia swerve their missile hauler away from a female pit bull. On camera, Commander Ben Randall does damage control. Following blood, Gibbs finds her shot. Doctor Shawna Street reports two more shot dead and all were abused. Staking out the area, Gibbs pulls another dead dog from Ruthann Harrison's pond near Luke Stana's trailer. Gibbs attacks Stana, telling his team, "Tell the truth," as NCIS Inspector General Eugene Coyle arrests him for aggravated assault. Dr. Grace Confalone provides Vance her psych evaluation on Stana, who attends Gamblers Anonymous; she suspects dog fighting. Torn between duty and loyalty, McGee lies saying Stana tripped and fell. Bishop and Torres do likewise, jeopardizing their own careers. Vance hires attorney July Wunderman to stall Coyle while NCIS gathers evidence to prove Stana killed at least ten dogs for losing him money. On his prototype bodycam, McGee sees blood on Stana's shirt before Gibbs attacked. Kasie matches it to newly-named Lucy (Gibbs' rescued dog). Through a GPS collar on Stana's poodle, they catch him with remaining pit bulls. A dog-lover himself, Coyle collars Stana and allows Vance to discipline Gibbs, who is suspended indefinitely, taking Lucy home with him.
409	11	"Gut Punch"	Rocky Carroll	Christopher J. Waild	April 6, 2021	1811	10.26
As punishment for their actions in the case against Gibbs, the team is assigned to be COVID-19 officers for an event the Secretary of Defense is hosting with the Yemeni Government, while night shift agents spearhead a murder investigation. McGee, Bishop, and Torres discover a link between that case and the SecDef's event, and later have to intervene when they find out that the SecDef has been targeted by a hitman. Meanwhile, Gibbs is met at the diner by investigative reporter Marcie Warren and reluctantly tells her the truth about his confrontation with Stana. With the story out there for the public, Vance visits Gibbs and tells him he cannot save him from the fallout this time.
410	12	"Sangre"	James Whitmore Jr.	Marco Schnabel	April 27, 2021	1812	8.56
The lead suspect in the death of a Marine sergeant in an open house is Torres' father, who walked out on Torres when he was young. Meanwhile, Gibbs takes the opportunity to get caught up on household chores while suspended from the agency. He is visited by Marcie Warren, who asks him to review some of her work.
411	13	"Misconduct"	Tawnia McKiernan	Brendan Fehily & Margaret Rose Lester & David J. North	May 4, 2021	1813	9.70
While biking with a friend, a petty officer is killed in a hit-and-run. The team comes to realize the friend was the intended target, as he was an accountant set to testify against Parker James, accused of a Ponzi scheme against sailors. The team later finds the witness dead, and though Gibbs testifies against James, the prosecutor is reluctant to put him on the stand due to his suspension from NCIS. James' lawyer attacks Gibbs' credibility, and the jury finds the defendant not guilty. However, NCIS is able to arrest him and his estranged wife for ordering the hit on his accountant.
412	14	"Unseen Improvements"	Diana Valentine	Steven D. Binder & Scott Williams	May 11, 2021	1814	8.94
NCIS' investigation into the murder of a captain in the National Military Command Center leads them to Hassan Sayegh, the biological uncle of Gibbs' former neighbor Phineas. Hassan was after the captain's laptop to hack into NCIS case history so he can get to Phineas after causing his foster parents' car to crash. Phineas runs to Gibbs' house and bonds with Lucy. The team arrests Hassan, but not before he reveals his own son needs a bone marrow transplant, which Phineas agrees to donate. Gibbs allows Phineas to take Lucy home with him. Elsewhere, Torres and Bishop agree to discuss their apparent feelings for each other after questioning by Palmer and Kasie.
413	15	"Blown Away"	Michael Zinberg	Marco Schnabel & Christopher J. Waild	May 18, 2021	1815	8.73
NCIS REACT agent Jessica Knight successfully talks down a hostage situation, but then an explosion kills her team. Knight joins in the investigation, which leads to the revelation that the REACT team was the target all along. Elsewhere, Gibbs and Marcie Warren investigate a cold case off the books. Cast: This is the first guest star appearance of Katrina Law as Jessica Knight.
414	16	"Rule 91"	Diana Valentine	Brendan Fehily & David J. North	May 25, 2021	1816	8.96
Part 1 of 5: While pursuing the dangerous arms dealer Afrim Murati, the team is shocked when NSA Deputy Director Ronda Ellis implicates Bishop in an decade-old NSA leak. McGee and Knight attempt to prove her innocence, but ultimately Bishop reveals her complicity and quits NCIS. Torres realizes that Bishop's exit was a planned maneuver between her and Odette Malone (Ziva David's ex-CIA contact), so as to set Bishop up on a long-term, undercover mission which required her to be a "disgraced NCIS agent." The two share a goodbye kiss after an argument, and Bishop leaves. Meanwhile, Gibbs and Marcie realize that the serial killer they have been investigating may be listening to them with bugs, and following their movements. Gibbs names his newly completed boat Rule 91 ("When you walk away, don't look back"), and tests it out on the lake where they believe another serial murder took place. His boat explodes, and Gibbs swims away from the wreckage. Cast: This is the final appearance of Emily Wickersham as Eleanor "Ellie" Bishop until season 23.

== Production ==
=== Development ===
The season was ordered on May 6, 2020. On June 3, 2020, Steven D. Binder announced that the writers had begun working on the season. Scripts initially written for cancelled Season 17 episodes were integrated into this season's second and fourth episodes, "Everything Starts Somewhere" and "Sunburn." The exit of Maria Bello's Jacqueline Sloane, which would have occurred in the unproduced Season 17 finale, was integrated into the season's eighth episode, "True Believer," though similarities to the originally planned storyline remain undetermined. On August 12, 2020, it was announced that CBS Television Studios had signed a deal with the law enforcement advisory group 21CP Solutions, to consult on its crime and legal dramas, which includes NCIS. 21CP Solutions would help the series to more accurately portray law enforcement; this comes after the George Floyd protests, which caused the television industry to rethink their portrayal of law enforcement. On September 21, 2020, it was announced that the season would start by exploring where Gibbs, played by series star Mark Harmon, disappeared to during the episode "Musical Chairs" from the previous season, before returning to the present day. On October 27, 2020, it was announced that season would comprise sixteen episodes.

=== Filming ===
The planned twenty-first episode of the seventeenth season, which was postponed due to production on the season being shut down due to the COVID-19 pandemic in the United States, was the first episode filmed of season eighteen. The planned twenty-second episode of season seventeen, which would have been the 400th episode of the series, was filmed and aired second, which kept it as the 400th episode. Production on the eighteenth season began on September 9, 2020, and the series continued to be filmed in Los Angeles. Filming for season 18 wrapped up on March 29, 2021.

=== Casting ===
On May 6, 2020, it was announced that Harmon had closed a new deal with CBS Television Studios. On July 24, 2020, it was announced that series regular Maria Bello is set to leave the show during the season, and appear in eight episodes to wrap up her character's storyline. On September 9, 2020, it was announced that Harmon's son Sean, would return in episode two as a younger version of his father's character. On October 21, 2020, it was announced that Adam Campbell would also return in episode two, as a younger version of Ducky. In March 2021, Katrina Law was cast in the role of Jessica Knight. Law appeared in the final two episodes of the season with the potential to become a series regular if the series is renewed for a nineteenth season. On May 26, 2021, it was confirmed that series regular Emily Wickersham would leave the series after 8 years.

=== Release ===
The season is set to premiere during the 2020–21 television season as part of CBS's Tuesday lineup with FBI and FBI: Most Wanted. On August 26, 2020, it was announced that CBS hoped to begin airing the season in November 2020. On October 13, 2020, it was announced that the season would premiere on November 17, 2020. It was also announced that this will be the final season on the Tuesday timeslot, it will be moved on Mondays on its 19th season leading into its new spinoff series NCIS: Hawaiʻi.

== Ratings ==
Viewership and ratings per episode of NCIS season 18
No.	Title	Air date	Rating/share (18–49)	Viewers (millions)	DVR (18–49)	DVR viewers (millions)	Total (18–49)	Total viewers (millions)
1	"Sturgeon Season"	November 17, 2020	0.9/6	10.35	0.4	2.97	1.4	13.37
2	"Everything Starts Somewhere"	November 24, 2020	0.9/6	10.15	—N/a	—N/a	—N/a	—N/a
3	"Blood and Treasure"	December 8, 2020	0.7/4	8.53	0.5	3.21	1.2	11.74
4	"Sunburn"	January 19, 2021	0.8/5	9.63	—N/a	—N/a	—N/a	—N/a
5	"Head of the Snake"	January 19, 2021	0.8/5	8.74	—N/a	—N/a	—N/a	—N/a
6	"1mm"	January 26, 2021	1.0/6	10.02	—N/a	—N/a	—N/a	—N/a
7	"The First Day"	February 9, 2021	0.9/6	9.74	0.5	3.37	1.4	13.12
8	"True Believer"	March 2, 2021	0.8/5	9.60	0.4	3.18	1.3	12.79
9	"Winter Chill"	March 9, 2021	0.8/6	9.77	0.5	3.27	1.3	13.14
10	"Watchdog"	March 16, 2021	0.9/6	9.98	—N/a	—N/a	—N/a	—N/a
11	"Gut Punch"	April 6, 2021	1.0/7	10.26	0.4	2.82	1.3	13.08
12	"Sangre"	April 27, 2021	0.6/4	8.56	0.3	2.24	0.9	10.75
13	"Misconduct"	May 4, 2021	0.8/6	9.70	0.3	2.80	1.1	12.44
14	"Unseen Improvements"	May 11, 2021	0.7/5	8.94	0.4	3.02	1.1	11.96
15	"Blown Away"	May 18, 2021	0.7/5	8.73	0.4	3.09	1.1	11.82
16	"Rule 91"	May 25, 2021	0.7/5	8.96	0.4	3.14	1.1	12.10
