= NCIS: Hawaiʻi season 1 =

NCIS: Hawaiʻi
- Season 1
- Showrunner: Matt Bosack
- Starring: Vanessa Lachey; Alex Tarrant; Noah Mills; Yasmine Al-Bustami; Jason Antoon; Tori Anderson; Kian Talan
- No. of episodes: 22

Release
- Original network: CBS
- Original release: September 20, 2021 – May 23, 2022

Season chronology
- Next → Season 2

The first season of the American police procedural television series NCIS: Hawaiʻi premiered on September 20, 2021, on CBS, for the 2021–22 television season, and concluded on May 23, 2022. The season contained 22 episodes.

NCIS: Hawaiʻi follows a fictional team of special agents from the Naval Criminal Investigative Service based in Hawaiʻi. The series stars Vanessa Lachey with Alex Tarrant, Noah Mills, Yasmine Al-Bustami, Jason Antoon, Tori Anderson and Kian Talan.

A fourth NCIS spin-off was confirmed in February 2021. Unlike the other series in the franchise, Hawaiʻi was not introduced via a backdoor pilot within another series. Lachey was cast in the lead role of Jane Tennant in April 2021, making Hawaiʻi the first series in the franchise to have a female lead. CBS officially ordered the series in the same month.

The first season ranked number 14 for the 2021–22 United States television season, had an average of 8.28 million viewers, and received mostly mixed reviews.

== Cast and characters ==
=== Main ===
- Vanessa Lachey as Jane Tennant: The first female Special Agent-in-Charge of the NCIS: Hawaiʻi Field Office.
- Alex Tarrant as Kai Holman: A new NCIS agent on the team who recently returned home to care for his father.
- Noah Mills as Jesse Boone: Tennant's confidant and second-in-command, Boone is a former homicide detective in Washington, DC, who knows the islands' hiking trails well.
- Yasmine Al-Bustami as Lucy Tara: The junior field agent of NCIS: Hawaiʻi, and Whistler's love-interest turned girlfriend.
- Jason Antoon as Ernie Malik: NCIS: Hawaiʻi's cyber intelligence specialist
- Tori Anderson as Kathrine "Kate" Marie Whistler: a Defense Intelligence Agency (DIA) Officer, later Federal Bureau of Investigation (FBI) Special Agent and NCIS-FBI liaison. Tara's love interest-turned-girlfriend.
- Kian Talan as Alex Tennant: Jane's eldest child.

=== Recurring ===
- Enver Gjokaj as Captain Joe Milius: Deputy Chief of Staff to Commander, Pacific Fleet, and Jane's lover after being reassigned to the Pentagon.
- Mahina Napoleon as Julie Tennant: Jane's youngest child.
- Julie White as Maggie Shaw: Jane's former mentor and friend.
- Sharif Atkins as Captain Norman 'Boom Boom' Gates
- Seana Kofoed as Commander (Dr.) Carla Chase, a medical examiner assigned to Joint Base Pearl Harbor–Hickam.

=== Guest stars ===
- Beulah Koale as David Sola: A New Zealand intelligence specialist.
- Mark Gessner as Agent Neil Pike: A Coast Guard Investigative Service Agent.

=== Crossover ===
- Wilmer Valderrama as Nick Torres: NCIS Special Agent who shares a past with Tennant.
- Katrina Law as Jessica Knight: NCIS Special Agent.
- Diona Reasonover as Kasie Hines: Forensic Specialist for NCIS.
- Gary Cole as Alden Parker: NCIS Supervisory Special Agent of the MCRT.

== Episodes ==
No. overall	No. in season	Title	Directed by	Written by	Original release date	Prod. code	U.S. viewers (millions)
1	1	"Pilot"	Larry Teng	Matt Bosack & Jan Nash & Christopher Silber	September 20, 2021	HAW101	6.59
The peace of Hawaii is shattered when an experimental Navy aircraft crashes into a mountain, killing its pilot. NCIS Special Agent in Charge Jane Tennant and her team of NCIS agents Jesse Boone, Lucy Tara and Kai Holman along with NCIS computer specialist Ernie Malik, investigate the incident with the team wondering who's responsible for the crash.
2	2	"Boom"	Larry Teng	Jan Nash & Christopher Silber	September 27, 2021	HAW102	5.54
When an armored truck is attacked with one of the guards being murdered and his colleague being left alive, Jane and the team find evidence that similar attacks have occurred all over the world. Meanwhile, Kai desperately tries to find a new home. Also, Lucy and DIA officer Kate Whistler engage in a standoff concerning their previous meeting.
3	3	"Recruiter"	Ruben Garcia	Matt Bosack & Yalun Tu	October 4, 2021	HAW103	5.54
When a Navy Petty Officer attempting to help wayward children find a new path by joining the military is shot dead, Kai goes undercover to befriend members of one of the oldest surf gangs residing in Hawaii to gain information.
4	4	"Paniolo"	Larry Teng	Noah Evslin	October 11, 2021	HAW104	5.29
When an off-duty Marine (and Hawaiian native) who's out riding his horse is shot, the team find themselves attempting to gain the trust of the Paniolo (Hawaiian cowboy) community in hopes of identifying and bringing the person responsible for the attack to justice.
5	5	"Gaijin"	Tim Andrew	Ron McGee	October 18, 2021	HAW105	5.35
When a Japanese sailor is found stabbed to death on a bench in downtown Oahu, the team discovers that the main suspect is also linked to the murder of the victim's girlfriend back in Japan. The team scrambles to find the true murderer before the wrong person is accused, which in turn could cause a diplomatic crisis between the United States and Japan.
6	6	"The Tourist"	Yangzom Braun	Amy Rutberg	November 1, 2021	HAW106	5.07
The team investigate when a global star is kidnapped, only to discover that the supposed global star and her new husband aren't who they appear to be. The case putting the team at odds with Whistler, who has an agenda of her own. Meanwhile, Jane's old CIA mentor and friend Maggie Shaw comes to Hawaii to visit.
7	7	"Rescuers"	James Bamford	Yakira Chambers	November 8, 2021	HAW107	5.11
When a Navy Petty Officer is murdered, the team steps in to protect his girlfriend, a Coast Guard rescue swimmer, from any further attacks.
8	8	"Legacy"	Lisa Demaine	Yalun Tu	November 29, 2021	HAW108	5.02
The body of an anti-capitalist is found in a field, with the team finding themselves being dragged into a fight between eco-activists and a tech billionaire seeking control of a piece of land. Meanwhile, Jane goes on a date with Captain Milius.
9	9	"Impostor"	Loren Yaconelli	Matt Bosack	December 6, 2021	HAW109	5.16
When the remains of a Navy officer who served during World War II are discovered in a cave on a beach, the team discovers that the remains belong to a hundred year old survivor who's going to be honored at a ceremony for the 80th anniversary of the Pearl Harbor attacks, even though the victim was thought to have been murdered 8 decades ago. Ending caption: This episode is dedicated to all those who perished on December 7, 1941, and to all those who served – of all race, ethnicity, creed and citizenship status.
10	10	"Lost"	Tim Andrew	Jan Nash	January 3, 2022	HAW110	4.91
The team investigate when a shipping container filled with contraband weapons goes missing, with the case leading them to cross paths with DIA officer Kate Whistler once again.
11	11	"The Game"	James Hayman	Noah Evslin & Amy Rutberg	January 17, 2022	HAW111	5.01
When evidence collected to help put a drug dealer away disappears, the team works with a Detective of the Honolulu Police Department to uncover who was responsible, sending Lucy undercover to an underground poker tournament. Meanwhile, Whistler's ex-girlfriend is in town, and Lucy finds herself struggling to come to terms with her feelings.
12	12	"Spies"	LeVar Burton	Yakira Chambers & Ron McGee	January 23, 2022	HAW112	9.79
13	13	"Spies"	Tessa Blake	Christopher Silber	January 24, 2022	HAW113	5.41
Part 1 : the team investigates the death of a Navy engineer, the case turns personal for Jane when it's revealed that the last person he met before his death was none other than Maggie Shaw, Jane's mentor and friend who is later kidnapped. They find themselves working alongside an intelligence service case officer from New Zealand, who believes a potential lead in the case he's been working on could in turn lead them to a black op secret agent working for the Chinese. Part 2 : As Jane continues working on the case of Maggie's abduction, she soon finds information that reveals her friend/mentor is not who she appears to be. Jane enlists the help of her team and Whistler to further investigate Maggie.
14	14	"Broken"	Norman Buckley	Matt Bosack & Jan Nash	February 28, 2022	HAW114	4.54
As Jane faces a committee who have questions for her regarding her friendship with Maggie Shaw, the disgraced CIA officer who was recently exposed as a spy working for the Chinese, the team investigate when a group of Marines fall ill with mysterious symptoms including damaged ear canals from a weapon capable of emitting ultrasonic waves.
15	15	"Pirates"	Tim Andrew	Yalun Tu	March 7, 2022	HAW115	5.38
Jesse's day of spending time with his daughter, Gracie is ruined when a group of pirates storm the yacht, taking everyone hostage. As Jesse fights to defend himself and Gracie as well as the hostages, his colleagues race to help save the hostages before it's too late.
16	16	"Monster"	Leslie Hope	Ron McGee	March 14, 2022	HAW116	5.10
When a hitman who murdered an NCIS agent and two FBI agents in Pittsburgh shows up in Hawaii, Kai goes undercover as a chef in a fine dining restaurant to track him down before more people are killed. Meanwhile, Jane and her ex husband Daniel find out their son Alex got into Amherst University, much to Daniel's disdain.
17	17	"Breach"	Christine Moore	Yakira Chambers	March 21, 2022	HAW118	5.07
When a ransomware attack causes a dam to begin malfunctioning, Ernie and a group of hackers are given the assignment of finding and stopping the person responsible before Hawaii loses all power.
18	18	"T'N'T"	Lionel Coleman	Christopher Silber & Megan Bacharach	March 28, 2022	HAW117	6.13
Following the ambush that leaves the witness they were escorting dead with his body later disappearing during the resulting gunfight, NCIS Special Agents Nick Torres and Jessica Knight of the Washington, D.C. team works with Jane and the Hawaii team to find out who was responsible. Note : This episode concludes a crossover event that begins on NCIS season 19 episode 17.
19	19	"Nurture"	Lin Oeding	Jan Nash	April 18, 2022	HAW119	5.09
When a ship carrying exotic animals runs aground causing a shipwreck, the team work to find out the circumstances of the shipwreck and to find the exotic animals who might possess a threat to the wildlife on Oahu. Meanwhile, Jane receives news about her son Alex. Also, Kai asks a Fish and Wildlife agent out on a date.
20	20	"Nightwatch"	Tawnia McKiernan	Amy Rutberg	May 2, 2022	HAW120	5.21
A day off for the team is interrupted when they're brought in to investigate a Navy Seaman involved in a murder.
21	21	"Switchback"	Jimmy Whitmore	Noah Evslin	May 16, 2022	HAW121	4.97
Captain Milius returns to Hawaii to ask Jane and her team for help concerning a top-secret prisoner exchange that if exposed or interrupted in any way threatens to ignite a new Cold War between the United States and Russia.
22	22	"Ohana"	Tim Andrew	Matt Bosack & Christopher Silber	May 23, 2022	HAW122	5.47
Following the prisoner exchange, the team continues working with Captain Milius to determine who knew of the exchange and was responsible for the fatal poisoning of a Navy Commander.

== Production ==
=== Development ===
On February 16, 2021, anonymous sources told The Hollywood Reporter that deals were being finalized on a potential fourth series in the NCIS franchise, titled NCIS: Hawaii, as it neared a straight-to-series order from CBS. They also said that series would be created and executive-produced by Christopher Silber, Jan Nash, and Matt Bosack, with Silber and Nash also serving as co-showrunners. Unlike the other series in the franchise, it is not planned to start with a backdoor pilot within another series. The series location would also create potential crossover opportunities with CBS's other Hawaii-based drama, Magnum P.I. NCIS: Los Angeles previously crossed over with Magnum P.I.'s now concluded sister series, Hawaii Five-0, in 2012. The sources also said that the producers had already started looking for a director for a pilot and were working on hiring writers.

In early April 2021, it was reported that the series was expected to be picked up for the 2021–22 television season. On April 23, 2021, CBS officially ordered NCIS: Hawaii to series. Larry Teng was also announced to be executive producing the pilot episode. Bosack, Nash, and Silber wrote the pilot episode for the series. The series name was also officially changed to NCIS: Hawaiʻi, adding an ʻokina in an effort to reflect the official spelling used in the Hawaiian language. On October 11, 2021, CBS picked up the series for a full season. On January 3, 2022, it was announced that a crossover with the nineteenth season of parent series NCIS would be taking place on March 28, 2022. Showrunners of both series had previously mentioned crossing over and CBS Entertainment President Kelly Kahl had stated that discussion about a crossover would start after NCIS: Hawaiʻi finished its first batch of episodes.

=== Casting ===
On April 7, 2021, it was reported that CBS was looking to cast a female lead for the NCIS: Hawaii making it the first series in the franchise to do so. The character for the female lead was tentatively named Jane Tennant, and casting for the role as well as other principal characters began around the same time. On April 30, 2021, it was announced that Vanessa Lachey was the first to be cast as a series regular, in the role of Jane Tennant. Meanwhile, Yasmine Al-Bustami and Jason Antoon were also cast as series regulars to portray Lucy and Ernie, respectively. It was later announced that Noah Mills had joined the cast as Jesse. Tori Anderson and Kian Talan were cast as series regulars in the roles of Kate Whistler and Alex. On July 8, 2021, Alex Tarrant joined the main cast as Kai and Enver Gjokaj was announced to be recurring as Joe Milius.

Former Hawaii Five-0 star Beulah Koale was cast as a guest star in the series' first two-part story. NCIS stars Wilmer Valderrama and Katrina Law, the latter of whom also starred on Hawaii Five-0, appeared as their NCIS characters in a crossover event. Gary Cole and Diona Reasonover also appeared as their NCIS characters in the crossover event.

=== Filming ===
Filming for the series began at an undisclosed location on the North Shore of Oahu with a traditional Hawaiian blessing on June 16, 2021. Two days later on June 18, 2021, filming took place at Joint Base Pearl Harbor–Hickam. Both the first and second episodes had concluded filming by July 22, 2021. The first season concluded filming on March 19, 2022.

== Reception ==
=== Critical response ===
The season was met with generally mixed reviews from critics. On Rotten Tomatoes the season has an approval rating of 60% based on reviews from 5 critics.

=== Ratings ===
The season premiered with 6.59 million viewers and a 0.51 ratings share among adults 18–49. Ratings hit an all-time high with its twelfth episode, "Spies, Part 1", which was watched by 9.79 million viewers and garnered a 2.1 ratings share with adults 18–49. The crossover event with NCIS drew 6.13 million viewers. The finale was seen by 5.47 million people. For the first season, NCIS: Hawaiʻi was the 14th most seen show in total viewership, averaging 8.28 million viewers.

Viewership and ratings per episode of NCIS: Hawaiʻi season 1
No.	Title	Air date	Rating (18–49)	Viewers (millions)	DVR (18–49)	DVR viewers (millions)	Total (18–49)	Total viewers (millions)
1	"Pilot"	September 20, 2021	0.51	6.59	0.25†	2.62†	0.76†	9.21†
2	"Boom"	September 27, 2021	0.50	5.54	0.19†	1.96†	0.69†	7.50†
3	"Recruiter"	October 4, 2021	0.48	5.54	0.21†	2.16†	0.69†	7.70†
4	"Paniolo"	October 11, 2021	0.42	5.29	0.23	2.55	0.65	7.84
5	"Gaijin"	October 18, 2021	0.48	5.35	0.24	2.64	0.72	7.99
6	"The Tourist"	November 1, 2021	0.48	5.07	0.21†	2.03†	0.69†	7.10†
7	"Rescuers"	November 8, 2021	0.45	5.11	0.19†	1.98†	0.64†	7.09†
8	"Legacy"	November 29, 2021	0.46	5.02	0.30	3.00	0.76	8.02
9	"Impostor"	December 6, 2021	0.44	5.16	0.28	2.57	0.71	7.73
10	"Lost"	January 3, 2022	0.38	4.92	0.23†	2.30†	0.61†	7.22†
11	"The Game"	January 17, 2022	0.41	5.01	0.22†	2.38†	0.63†	7.39†
12	"Spies, Part 1"	January 23, 2022	2.1	9.79	—N/a	—N/a	—N/a	—N/a
13	"Spies, Part 2"	January 24, 2022	0.5	5.41	—N/a	—N/a	—N/a	—N/a
14	"Broken"	February 28, 2022	0.4	4.54	—N/a	—N/a	—N/a	—N/a
15	"Pirates"	March 7, 2022	0.5	5.38	—N/a	—N/a	—N/a	—N/a
16	"Monster"	March 14, 2022	0.5	5.10	—N/a	—N/a	—N/a	—N/a
17	"Breach"	March 21, 2022	0.5	5.07	—N/a	—N/a	—N/a	—N/a
18	"T'N'T"	March 28, 2022	0.5	6.13	—N/a	—N/a	—N/a	—N/a
19	"Nurture"	April 18, 2022	0.4	5.09	—N/a	—N/a	—N/a	—N/a
20	"Nightwatch"	May 2, 2022	0.4	5.21	0.22†	—N/a	—N/a	—N/a
21	"Switchback"	May 16, 2022	0.3	4.97	0.27†	2.27†	0.14†	7.24†
22	"Ohana"	May 23, 2022	0.4	5.47	0.18†	3.44†	0.17†	8.91†

†These DVR ratings are based on Live + Three Day rating results

== Home media ==
NCIS: Hawaiʻi: Season One
Set details	Special features	
6 disc; 22 episodes		
DVD release dates
Region 1	Region 2	Region 4
September 6, 2022		
