= NCIS season 19 =

NCIS
- Season 19
- Season 19 U.S. DVD cover
- Starring: Mark Harmon; Sean Murray; Wilmer Valderrama; Katrina Law; Brian Dietzen; Diona Reasonover; David McCallum; Rocky Carroll; Gary Cole
- No. of episodes: 21

Release
- Original network: CBS
- Original release: September 20, 2021 – May 23, 2022

Season chronology
- ← Previous; Season 18 Next → Season 20

The nineteenth season of the American police procedural television series NCIS premiered on September 20, 2021, on CBS, for the 2021–22 television season, and concluded on May 23, 2022. The season contained 21 episodes. This is the final season to feature Mark Harmon as Gibbs.

NCIS revolves around a fictional team of special agents from the Naval Criminal Investigative Service, which conducts criminal investigations involving the United States Navy and Marine Corps. The series stars Mark Harmon, Sean Murray, Wilmer Valderrama, Katrina Law, Brian Dietzen, Diona Reasonover, David McCallum, Rocky Carroll, and Gary Cole. The season is the first with Law and Cole following the departures of Maria Bello and Emily Wickersham during the previous season. Harmon departed the series as a regular after the fourth episode, "Great Wide Open" but still appears in the title sequence for the remainder of the season.

== Cast and characters ==
=== Main ===
- Mark Harmon as Leroy Jethro Gibbs, former NCIS Supervisory Special Agent (SSA) of the Major Case Response Team (MCRT) assigned to Washington's Navy Yard (episodes 1–4)
- Sean Murray as Timothy McGee, NCIS Senior Special Agent, Second in Command of MCRT
- Wilmer Valderrama as Nick Torres, NCIS Special Agent
- Katrina Law as Jessica Knight, NCIS Special Agent
- Brian Dietzen as Dr. Jimmy Palmer, Chief Medical Examiner for NCIS
- Diona Reasonover as Kasie Hines, Forensic Specialist for NCIS
- David McCallum as Dr. Donald "Ducky" Mallard, NCIS Historian and former Chief Medical Examiner
- Rocky Carroll as Leon Vance, NCIS Director
- Gary Cole as Alden Parker, former FBI Special Agent turned NCIS Supervisory Special Agent (SSA) of MCRT (guest episode 2, main cast starting episode 3)

=== Recurring ===
- Pam Dawber as Marcie Warren, investigative journalist
- Joe Spano as Tobias Fornell, Private Detective and former FBI Senior Special Agent
- Jason Wiles as Paul LeMere, former Navy Seal and contract killer who blew up Gibbs' boat
- Valarie Pettiford as Sonia Eberhart, CEO of Sonova Industries arrested for paying Hanover to hire LeMere to kill opponents to her planned copper mine in Alaska
- John Hensley as Phil Hanover, a man who hired LeMere to kill opponents to Sonia Eberhart's proposed Alaskan copper mine
- Margo Harshman as Delilah Fielding-McGee, DoD Intelligence Analyst and McGee's wife
- Laura San Giacomo as Dr. Grace Confalone, psychotherapist
- Erik Passoja as FBI Deputy Director Wayne Sweeney

=== Notable guests ===
- Kelly Stables as Astrid Fellowes
- Patricia Richardson as Judy Fielding, Delilah's mother and McGee's mother-in-law
- Don Swayze as Peter Walker
- Stepfanie Kramer as Sandra Holdren
- Denise Crosby as Hattie Taylor, Secretary of the Navy
- Zane Holtz as Dale Sawyer, NCIS Special Agent
- Meredith Eaton as Carol Wilson, CDC immunologist and friend of Abby, McGee, and Palmer
- Michelle Pierce as Breena Palmer, Jimmy Palmer's deceased wife
- Elle Graper as Victoria Palmer, Jimmy Palmer's daughter
- Naomi Grace as Kayla Vance, Leon Vance's daughter and NCIS Probationary Agent
- Kevin Chapman as Billy Doyle, old friend of Parker
- Jack McGee as Richard "Rick" Jordan, a grieving father
- Cay Murray (real-life daughter of Sean Murray) as Teagan Fields
- Teri Polo as Vivian Kolchak, Alden Parker's ex-wife and DOD paranormal investigator
- Francis Xavier McCarthy as Roman Parker, Alden Parker's father

=== Crossover ===
- Vanessa Lachey as Jane Tennant, NCIS Special Agent in Charge
- Jason Antoon as Ernie Malik, NCIS cyber intelligence specialist

== Episodes ==
No. overall	No. in season	Title	Directed by	Written by	Original release date	Prod. code	U.S. viewers (millions)
415	1	"Blood in the Water"	Michael Zinberg	Christopher J. Waild	September 20, 2021	1901	8.46
Part 2 of 5: After the events in "Rule 91" Gibbs swims to shore with part of his boat piercing his abdomen, releasing blood in the water. County Deputy Regina Unger shows McGee and Torres the wreckage. Divers find Camila Salas' body, killed with a claw hammer and bound with red duct tape like previous serial murders, occurring one-hundred days apart. Gibbs wakes after being treated by ex-veterinarian Virgil McKeever, whose wife Thelma aims her rifle, believing him "part of that gang...at the north shore." Vance assigns rookie agent Brent Hollister, but McGee wants the more experienced REACT agent Jessica Knight instead. Using Kasie's tracker on the NCIS bug scanner she loaned Gibbs, they find journalist Marcie Warren's loft, vandalized. Spotting a phony cop (later identified as Randall Sledge), Thelma finally believes Gibbs' story, lending her rifle and motorcycle. Gibbs calls McGee, as Marcie tells them about the serial killer they are investigating. The team meets up at an abandoned Ranger Station, stocked with gas cans full of methamphetamine. Sledge's gunmen arrive, who Jessica distracts posing as a stranded tourist in need of fuel, while the team surrounds and arrests them, saving Sandy from Lonny. Cast: First main role appearance of Katrina Law as NCIS Special Agent Jessica Knight
416	2	"Nearly Departed"	Terrence O'Hara	Scott Williams	September 27, 2021	1902	8.06
Part 3 of 5: NCIS follows leads to catch Paul LeMere, the serial killer operating under the alias Tom Samuels. To protect Gibbs, Vance gives a press conference implying Gibbs died in the boat explosion. McGee, Torres, and Knight apprehend a man believed to be tied to the killer, but soon discover he is undercover FBI agent Alden Parker who was also investigating LeMere. Meanwhile, Torres is eager to give Bishop's desk to Knight, to her aggravation, culminating in an argument about personal space and Torres' lasting grief over Bishop's departure. The team locates LeMere, and after preventing Gibbs from shooting him, they find out he is not a serial killer but a contract killer. When Knight mentions the name of the account paying him in interrogation, LeMere shoves the desk at her, breaking the glass and allowing him to escape and hold Kasie hostage in the squad room. However, Gibbs shoots LeMere in the back from the elevator. Cast: First "also starring" appearance of Gary Cole as Alden Parker. Jason Wiles as Paul LeMere.
417	3	"Road to Nowhere"	Rocky Carroll	Marco Schnabel	October 4, 2021	1903	7.97
Part 4 of 5: LeMere survives his gunshot wounds, Gibbs having intentionally missed vital arteries. Parker and McGee question LeMere, who only mentions his first victim and offers to take Gibbs there, as that holds the key to solving the case. Parker tags along due to mistrust of LeMere's intentions, but is dumped by Gibbs after stopping for lunch. LeMere increasingly gets under Gibbs' skin, taunting the latter over the many similarities in their respective pasts, while the rest of the team investigates Sonova Industries, the company believed to be paying LeMere for the killings, with Knight going undercover. LeMere indeed leads Gibbs to a dead end at his wife's grave, hinting there is good fishing in Naktok Bay, before stepping on a landmine he had previously planted, blowing himself up. Cast: Gary Cole is added to the opening credits.
418	4	"Great Wide Open"	Terrence O'Hara	Brendan Fehily & David J. North	October 11, 2021	1904	7.66
Part 5 of 5: An FBI team led by Parker has a warrant for Gibbs' arrest due to his actions in the case against LeMere, but find his house deserted with a large hole in the basement (finally answering the series-long question of how he gets his boats out). Gibbs and McGee travel to Naktok Bay, Alaska to take down Sonova's proposed copper mine that would destroy the ecosystem. The rest of the team confirms that the mine is the motive behind the killings, with several of the victims being opponents to the mine's construction and environmental impact. After compiling enough evidence to arrest Sonova's CEO, Gibbs has McGee arrest him to keep his agents from being charged with harboring a fugitive. But Parker has a change of heart and lets Gibbs go, leading to Parker being fired from the FBI. Gibbs decides to stay in Naktok Bay, feeling a sense of peace he had not felt since the before deaths of his wife Shannon and daughter Kelly. He bids an emotional farewell to McGee. Cast: Final appearance of Mark Harmon as Leroy Jethro Gibbs.
419	5	"Face the Strange"	Diana Valentine	Steven D. Binder	October 18, 2021	1905	7.65
The team investigates the death of a soldier believed to be linked to a suicide bomber, only for the body to explode before Jimmy can examine it, prompting Ducky to once again suit up in scrubs. Meanwhile, Parker declines Vance's offer to take Gibbs' place on the team, though agrees to temporarily join them in the field. Torres is angered at Vance offering the role to Parker, but later learns that McGee was earlier offered to be promoted to team leader, but refused it citing the position's extraordinary personal and professional challenges and not wanting to be alienated from his own family like Gibbs was.
420	6	"False Start"	James Whitmore Jr.	Katherine Beattie & Christopher J. Waild	November 1, 2021	1906	7.28
NCIS investigates the death of a beloved Navy coach whose office is found to contain PEDs. Torres bonds with the coach's protégé, who asks to prove that the victim wasn't causing his athletes to cheat.
421	7	"Docked"	Michael Zinberg	Marco Schnabel & Yasemin Yilmaz	November 8, 2021	1908	7.32
McGee's mother-in-law Judy Price Fielding happens upon a dead sailor aboard a cruise ship. McGee juggles working the case and dealing with Delilah and Judy's bickering over what is perceived as Delilah's over-protectiveness of her mother. Cast: Patricia Richardson as Judy Price Fielding
422	8	"Peacekeeper"	Rocky Carroll	Margaret Rose Lester & Scott Williams	November 29, 2021	1907	7.34
The team investigates the death of a Navy reservist who is found in an abandoned car at a gun range, seemingly as a way for the killer to cover their tracks. Meanwhile, Kasie is shown to be struggling to cope with the hostage situation at the diner (see 17x19 "Blarney") and being held at knifepoint by LeMere in the squadroom, and contemplates buying a gun for protection. Also, Torres decides to fix the car as it resembles the first one he owned.
423	9	"Collective Memory"	Leslie Libman	Kimberly-Rose Wolter & David J. North	December 6, 2021	1909	7.25
A financial advisor who pled guilty to embezzling money from clients is found shot execution-style near a ballpark. Her estranged daughter Ruby assists NCIS in solving the case, as does a hologram made by the victim in hopes of making amends with Ruby. The case strikes a chord with Knight, who hasn't spoken to her own mother in a while.
424	10	"Pledge of Allegiance"	Rocky Carroll	Brendan Fehily	January 3, 2022	1910	6.94
NCIS investigates Rafi Nazar, a Navy Chief Warrant Officer suspected of stealing combat drone software to sell to terrorists. Meanwhile, Jimmy and McGee receive a large amount of money anonymously for their children, and Vance reveals that Gibbs has kept a scholarship fund open in honor of his late daughter, and Vance's own children were recipients as well.
425	11	"All Hands"	Martha Mitchell	Christopher J. Waild	January 17, 2022	1911	7.26
Terrorists posing as Navy servicemen take control of a ship in the North Atlantic under the guise of needing medical attention for a dead body. When NCIS is called in, the team is forced to hide, with Jimmy stowing away with their pilot who got shot. Meanwhile, Knight is asked by her niece to assist with her "Paper Pauline" project.
426	12	"Fight or Flight"	James Whitmore Jr.	Katherine Beattie	January 24, 2022	1912	7.79
While Torres works through his pent-up anger over his father, Bishop, and Gibbs all leaving, he and Agent Dale Sawyer go undercover as participants in a cage-fighting ring linked to a murdered sailor. Cast: Zane Holtz as Dale Sawyer
427	13	"The Helpers"	Diana Valentine	Brian Dietzen & Scott Williams	February 28, 2022	1913	7.12
The team investigates the death of an intruder at Quantico who was involved with a radical group planning a bioterror attack. Jimmy and Kasie unknowingly inhale a sample of the biotoxin the group was planning to use, sending the lab into lockdown. NCIS calls on old CDC friend Carol Wilson to help find the antidote. Meanwhile, Torres keeps a visiting Victoria Palmer busy with video games and other activities. The team is able to retrieve the antidote and kill the bioterror group's supposed leader (called the "Raven") in the nick of time, but as Jimmy and Kasie recover in the hospital, Vance and Parker inform the rest of the team that the actual Raven is still out there. Cast: Meredith Eaton as Carol Wilson
428	14	"First Steps"	Michael Zinberg	Yasemin Yilmaz	March 7, 2022	1914	7.43
Vance's daughter Kayla, who wants to be an agent, completes FLETC training and begins field training under Torres. The team is called in when a Navy doctor drops dead during surgery, but is forced to rescue Kayla from kidnappers who want a prisoner exchange: their cartel leader for Kayla.
429	15	"Thick as Thieves"	Terrence O'Hara	Marco Schnabel	March 14, 2022	1915	7.55
Parker reunites with his old friend and juvenile cellmate Billy Doyle when the latter's nephew, as well as a petty officer, are murdered. Meanwhile, Knight tries to get a date to her cousin's wedding so she can avoid questions about settling down. She eventually asks Jimmy, and a budding attraction is hinted. Cast: Kevin Chapman as Billy Doyle
430	16	"The Wake"	Rocky Carroll	Katie White	March 21, 2022	1916	6.66
A missing woman's case that was popularized on a true crime podcast turns into a murder case when pieces of her flesh and skin are discovered. Knight relies on her negotiation skills to prevent the woman's husband (who is the prime suspect in her disappearance) from shooting himself.
431	17	"Starting Over"	Michael Zinberg	Margaret Rose Lester & Scott Williams	March 28, 2022	1917	6.83
While Tobias Fornell and Dr. Grace Confalone assist NCIS in the apparent suicide case of a Naval officer in Palmer and Knight's grief group, Torres is informed by old colleague and friend Jane Tennant that a witness in an old case of his has resurfaced, but when they pick him up, their car is hit by a barrage of gunfire and overturns. Cast: Vanessa Lachey as Jane Tennant. Note: This episode begins a crossover event that concludes on NCIS: Hawaiʻi season 1 episode 18.
432	18	"Last Dance"	Terrence O'Hara	Brendan Fehily & David J. North	April 18, 2022	1918	6.34
Reymundo Diaz, an infamous arms dealer Torres locked up following an undercover stint, bribes his way out of prison seeking revenge against Torres. While undercover, Torres had fallen for Diaz's cousin Maria, and the regret of leaving her in witness protection adds to his continued internal struggles with abandonment.
433	19	"The Brat Pack"	Michael Zinberg	Katherine Beattie & Kimberly-Rose Wolter	May 2, 2022	1919	7.27
A series of break-ins at military housing in Quantico by rambunctious teens escalates to a bomb exploding at a Navy commander's home. While investigating, McGee bonds with Teagan Fields, one of the partying teens who had created software to generate fake QR codes to gain access into Quantico. During the case, the Hawaii office's cyber analyst Ernie Malik assists with the autopsy via video call, only for Jimmy to hang up on him when he keeps asking about Knight afterwards. Cast: Jason Antoon as Ernie Malik, and Cay Ryan Murray (Sean Murray's real-life daughter) as Teagan Fields.
434	20	"All or Nothing"	Tawnia McKiernan	Story by : Marco Schnabel & Yasemin Yilmaz; Teleplay by : Yasemin Yilmaz	May 16, 2022	1920	6.51
NCIS investigates the death of a Navy reservist who had slot machines in his van, while Jimmy and Knight volunteer to transport an organ to a hospital for a transplant. The two events coincide with each other as it is revealed that the patient is connected to the murder victim, and they were both trying to take down a corrupt business. Jimmy and Knight are pursued by the criminals and take shelter in an isolated cabin, where they admit to having feelings for each other.
435	21	"Birds of a Feather"	Terrence O'Hara	Christopher J. Waild	May 23, 2022	1921	7.47
Part 1 of 3: A birdwatcher photographs the kidnapping of a jogger, later revealed to be Parker's ex-wife, head of the FBI Unidentified Aerial Phenomena Task Force, Vivian Kolchak. To locate the crime scene, Parker consults his father Roman Parker, who was her last known contact. Discovering unsalted sesame seed shells, Parker suspects his corrupt ex-FBI partner, who they find dead with Parker's DNA under Frank Ressler's fingernails. Vivian describes her escape; clues lead Torres and Knight to where she was held, now abandoned, but with "nevermore" written on the wall, signaling the Raven is back (after events in "The Helpers"). The presumption is, the Raven framed Parker for both murder and fraud. Jimmy and Jessicas's relationship blossoms and they kiss, knocking over a potted pomato, discovering that Parker's house had been bugged by the FBI. Vance allows Parker to escape with Vivian before handing their case to the FBI, whose Deputy Director Wayne Sweeney has a grudge against Parker for not arresting Gibbs (in "Great Wide Open"). Driving away, Vivian is revealed to be secretly communicating with an unknown recipient. Cast: Teri Polo as Vivian Kolchak. Note: This is the final work to be directed by Terrence O'Hara, who died in December 2022, seven months after this episode aired.

== Production ==
=== Development ===
On April 15, 2021, it was announced that CBS had renewed NCIS for a nineteenth season. The season is set to bring back the series' typical "Case of the Week" format after having more story arcs during the previous season. Production on the season began in July 2021. Series regular Brian Dietzen wrote an episode of the season. On January 5, 2022, it was reported that production on the season had been suspended for at least a week after a cast or crew member tested positive for COVID-19.

=== Casting ===
In February 2021, it was reported by The Hollywood Reporter that series lead Mark Harmon had entered discussions to return for "a handful of episodes" for a nineteenth season after he was told that CBS would end the series if he left. On March 10, 2021, it was announced that Katrina Law had been cast in the final two episodes of the eighteenth season, with the option to be promoted to series regular for the nineteenth season. When the series was renewed, it was reported that Harmon would be returning. On May 26, 2021, it was revealed that Emily Wickersham would be leaving the series after the eighteenth season. Wickersham joins Maria Bello who left earlier in the eighteenth season. On June 16, 2021, Variety reported that Gary Cole was in talks for a major role in the nineteenth season. On June 21, 2021, TVLine reported that Harmon will only appear in a small number of episodes of the season. The following day, it was confirmed that Law and Cole would be series regulars for the nineteenth season. Law started as a series regular in the season premiere, "Blood in the Water", while Cole debuted in the second episode, "Nearly Departed". Joe Spano returned as Tobias Fornell, while Pam Dawber returned as Marcie Warren. On October 11, 2021, it was officially announced that Harmon would be departing the series, with the fourth episode, "Great Wide Open", being his last appearance as a regular. Harmon remains an executive producer and showrunner Steven D. Binder has left the door open for Harmon to appear in the future. In the seventh episode, "Docked", Margo Harshman reprised her role as Delilah Fielding-McGee, while Patricia Richardson guest-starred in the same episode as Judy Fielding. Meredith Eaton also reprised her role as Carol Wilson in an episode of the season.

=== Crossovers ===
On January 3, 2022, it was announced that a crossover with the first season of spin-off NCIS: Hawaiʻi would be taking place on March 28, 2022, with Wilmer Valderrama and Katrina Law announcing they were traveling to Hawaii for filming. Showrunners of both series had previously mentioned crossing over and CBS Entertainment President Kelly Kahl had stated that discussion about a crossover would start after NCIS: Hawaiʻi finished its first batch of episodes. Diona Reasonover and Gary Cole also made appearances on the NCIS Hawaiʻi episode of the crossover. The series were previously connected in the thirteenth episode of NCIS: Hawaiʻi when it was revealed that NCIS: Hawaiʻi protagonist Jane Tennant was recruited to NCIS by Leroy Jethro Gibbs. Vanessa Lachey appeared as Tennant in the NCIS episode of the crossover. On April 29, 2022, it was reported that Jason Antoon would be appearing in the nineteenth episode of the season as his NCIS: Hawaiʻi character, Ernie Malik.

== Marketing and release ==
On May 19, 2021, it was announced that the series would move from the Tuesday 8:00 PM ET timeslot that it had held for all of its previous seasons to Mondays at 9:00 PM ET, to allow FBI: International to join FBI and FBI: Most Wanted on Tuesdays. The season airs after The Neighborhood and Bob Hearts Abishola and leads into the first season of spin-off NCIS: Hawaiʻi. On July 12, 2021, it was revealed that the season would premiere on September 20, 2021. On September 13, 2021, the promotional poster for the season was released by TVLine.

== Ratings ==
Viewership and ratings per episode of NCIS season 19
No.	Title	Air date	Rating (18–49)	Viewers (millions)	DVR (18–49)	DVR viewers (millions)	Total (18–49)	Total viewers (millions)
1	"Blood in the Water"	September 20, 2021	0.7	8.45	—N/a	—N/a	—N/a	—N/a
2	"Nearly Departed"	September 27, 2021	0.7	8.06	—N/a	—N/a	—N/a	—N/a
3	"Road to Nowhere"	October 4, 2021	0.6	7.96	—N/a	—N/a	—N/a	—N/a
4	"Great Wide Open"	October 11, 2021	0.6	7.66	0.4	3.70	1.0	11.36
5	"Face the Strange"	October 18, 2021	0.6	7.65	0.4	3.78	1.0	11.43
6	"False Start"	November 1, 2021	0.6	7.28	—N/a	—N/a	—N/a	—N/a
7	"Docked"	November 8, 2021	0.6	7.32	—N/a	—N/a	—N/a	—N/a
8	"Peacekeeper"	November 29, 2021	0.6	7.34	0.4	3.71	1.0	11.05
9	"Collective Memory"	December 6, 2021	0.6	7.25	0.3	3.59	0.9	10.85
10	"Pledge of Allegiance"	January 3, 2022	0.5	6.94	—N/a	—N/a	—N/a	—N/a
11	"All Hands"	January 17, 2022	0.5	7.26	—N/a	—N/a	—N/a	—N/a
12	"Fight or Flight"	January 24, 2022	0.6	7.79	—N/a	—N/a	—N/a	—N/a
13	"The Helpers"	February 28, 2022	0.5	7.12	—N/a	—N/a	—N/a	—N/a
14	"First Steps"	March 7, 2022	0.6	7.43	0.3	3.37	0.9	10.83
15	"Thick As Thieves"	March 14, 2022	0.6	7.55	0.3	3.41	0.9	10.96
16	"The Wake"	March 21, 2022	0.6	6.66	—N/a	—N/a	—N/a	—N/a
17	"Starting Over"	March 28, 2022	0.5	6.83	—N/a	—N/a	—N/a	—N/a
18	"Last Dance"	April 18, 2022	0.4	6.34	—N/a	—N/a	—N/a	—N/a
19	"The Brat Pack"	May 2, 2022	0.6	7.27	—N/a	—N/a	—N/a	—N/a
20	"All or Nothing"	May 16, 2022	0.4	6.51	—N/a	—N/a	—N/a	—N/a
21	"Birds of a Feather"	May 23, 2022	0.5	7.47	—N/a	—N/a	—N/a	—N/a
