= NCIS season 17 =

Season of television series

NCIS
- Season 17
- Season 17 U.S. DVD cover
- Starring: Mark Harmon; Sean Murray; Wilmer Valderrama; Emily Wickersham; Maria Bello; Brian Dietzen; Diona Reasonover; Rocky Carroll; David McCallum
- No. of episodes: 20

Release
- Original network: CBS
- Original release: September 24, 2019 – April 14, 2020

Season chronology
- ← Previous; Season 16 Next → Season 18

The seventeenth season of NCIS, an American police procedural drama television series, originally aired on CBS from September 24, 2019 through April 14, 2020. The season was produced by Belisarius Productions and CBS Television Studios. The season only contained 20 episodes, due to the COVID-19 pandemic. This is the first, and so far only, season in the series to not end in the usual May. It’s also the first season to not feature Joe Spano as Tobias Fornell.

NCIS revolves around a fictional team of special agents from the Naval Criminal Investigative Service, which conducts criminal investigations involving the U.S. Navy and Marine Corps.

In May 2020, CBS renewed the series for an eighteenth season.

== Cast and characters ==
=== Main ===
- Mark Harmon as Leroy Jethro Gibbs, NCIS Supervisory Special Agent (SSA) of the Major Case Response Team (MCRT) assigned to Washington's Navy Yard
- Sean Murray as Timothy McGee, NCIS Senior Special Agent, Second in Command of MCRT
- Wilmer Valderrama as Nick Torres, NCIS Special Agent
- Emily Wickersham as Eleanor "Ellie" Bishop, NCIS Special Agent
- Maria Bello as Dr. Jacqueline "Jack" Sloane, NCIS Senior Resident Agent and Operational Psychologist
- Brian Dietzen as Dr. Jimmy Palmer, Chief Medical Examiner for NCIS
- Diona Reasonover as Kasie Hines, Forensic Specialist for NCIS
- Rocky Carroll as Leon Vance, NCIS Director
- David McCallum as Dr. Donald "Ducky" Mallard, NCIS Historian and former Chief Medical Examiner

=== Special guest star ===
- Cote de Pablo as Ziva David, former Mossad Officer and former NCIS Special Agent

=== Recurring ===
- Laura San Giacomo as Dr. Grace Confalone, psychotherapist
- Megan Gallagher as Jennifer Leo, Under Secretary of the Navy
- Don Lake as Phillip Brooks, Navy Captain
- Louise Barnes as Mira Sahar Azam / Sarah, Gibbs's neighbor and terrorist
- Mouzam Makkar as fake Mira Sahar Azam
- Jack Fisher as Phineas, Sarah's son
- Usman Ally as Victor Mir, NCIS target
- Damon Dayoub as Adam Eshel, Mossad Agent
- Elayn J. Taylor as Odette Malone, owner of Ziva's private office and former CIA Operative
- Kate Hamilton as Faith Tolliver, Jack Sloane's biological daughter
- Karri Turner as Micki Kaydar, Phineas' aunt

=== Guest ===
- Devale Ellis as Dante Brown, Kasie's childhood best friend
- Patrick Duffy as Jack Briggs, retired Navy Lieutenant Commander
- Kevin Kilner as Patrick Norian, NSA Access Manager
- Lisa LoCicero as Elena Devol, Torres's girlfriend
- Camryn Grimes as Laney Alimonte, Marine Corporal
- Ellen Geer as Esther Daniels
- Daphne Zuniga as Stacy Gordon, Navy Commander
- Christopher Lloyd as Joseph "Joe" Smith
- Scott Menville as Army Sergeant Donald Ptorias

== Episodes ==
No. overall	No. in season	Title	Directed by	Written by	Original release date	Prod. code	U.S. viewers (millions)
379	1	"Out of the Darkness"	Terrence O'Hara	Gina Lucita Monreal	September 24, 2019	1701	12.57
Part 2 of 3: Willie rejects stolen phones as Gibbs steals Cy's Cadillac. Ziva David exclaims, "Drive." Eighteen hours earlier: After events in "Daughters" Gibbs and Ziva duck from machinegun fire. Gibbs' team finds a secret coal chute exit, blood, and cloth not his. Ziva tells Gibbs, killing Sahar is her only path back to Tali and Tony. Odette Malone admits, Ziva went deep undercover (after events in "Dead Letter"). Adam Eshel reassured Ziva about neutralizing this threat. Ziva explains her anxiety pills. "Grizzly Adams" steals Ziva's dead-drop intel, forcing Gibbs to shoot him to save Ziva. Bishop's NSA contact names Syrian POW, Mira Sahar Azam, who escaped shortly before the David farmhouse attack. McGee decrypts the address of "Mister Rogers" who explains Sahar (an alias) wants Ziva dead because of her brother Ari Haswari. A sniper kills Rogers. Gibbs fires back. Presently: Torres witnesses the Cadillac-"jacking." Ziva signals, "stand down," which Bishop reinforces. From bedbugs, Kasie traces bodies to Bob's Diner where Odette arms Gibbs and Ziva. McGee convinces Vance to trust Ziva, who moves to kill the woman at Bob's, who says a U.S. Senator will also die if she does. Gibbs stands in Ziva's way. To be continued...
380	2	"Into the Light"	Tony Wharmby	Steven D. Binder	October 1, 2019	1702	12.51
Part 3 of 3: Gibbs interrupts deputies Andrews and Barney to jail Sahar. ZNN reports a bomber shot at a Senate event. McGee questions Senators Ortega and McCormick. Sahar's next bombing against a Congressman is likewise foiled. Palmer uncovers bomber tattoos; "100% White" extremist. Ziva reveals, Ari was in Sahar's Hamas splinter group. Kasie analyzes deliberately disabled bomb triggers, tracing back to Dwight Colton. Ziva and Torres stage a diversionary fight, arresting Colton's group, who names an accomplice, Chief Martin Freydano. Ziva argues with Gibbs for not seeking her in Israel, while she did seek to rescue him in Paraguay (in "House Divided"). McGee finds Freydano's burner. Kasie learns attacks were meant to trigger "Iron Citidel" Patriot Act protocols in Sahar's scheme for Ziva to infiltrate NCIS and transfer fifty-million in frozen assets to rebuild Sahar's group. Kasie locates Ziva from Ducky's phone. Sahar reneges, about to kill Ziva, but Gibbs' team arrives. Ziva alerted Interpol, setting a money trap for Sahar's operatives. Sahar executes "Plan C" – her men kill her. Making peace, Gibbs explains why he did not search after Ziva's death was reported. She says there is one more thing to do, alone, before reuniting with her family.
381	3	"Going Mobile"	Thomas J. Wright	Scott Williams	October 8, 2019	1703	11.19
Lenny Dunstrop hauls machine parts into Washington Navy Yard. MP Vera Armstrong finds a body under his semi-trailer. Finding ceramics, Palmer concludes, "death by garden gnome," identifying store manager Elijah Buck, who was co-owner, with his brother Peter, of Happy Trails trailer park. Gnome-owner Vincent Pierman complains about rent hikes. Running from his trailer, full of military weapons, Lou Jinks complains about "slimy mobile home guru" Mike Midas, who suggests "Bankruptcy can always be your friend." Peter shows a "you're next" note, implicating tenants "ringleader" Esther Daniels. Bishop and Torres investigate Peter's Molotov car fire. Ducky unearths Vincent's sealed FBI file, real name, Vincenzo Palumbo, hiding after ratting on mafia associates; with worsening asthma and a dying garden, Kasie confirms toxic carcinogens that McGee traces to Zullow Chemical. In-house attorney Sara Jones advises Senior VP Lance Rama, as Ducky, masquerading as a scientist, inquires about their pesticide warehouse fire. Rama admits hiring Eli and Pete to buy the park and offer tenants "incentive packages" to move. Peter admits fighting about it with Eli, who accidentally fell on the gnome. Meanwhile, concerned about "agent morale," Vance has Sloane cure the team's "unfinished business vibe," in "the wake of 'Hurricane Ziva'."
382	4	"Someone Else's Shoes"	Michael Zinberg	Christopher J. Waild	October 15, 2019	1704	10.87
DASG May Stern corrects a tourist, "we don't have shows" at the Tomb of the Unknown Soldier, as a riderless horse rears. DASG Ian Nowitski finds severed feet, from which Palmer extracts Marine Sgt. David Holtzman's dogtag. Kasie says his ulcers indicate severe diabetes. Through bloodwork, they find Veterans Affairs Dr. Erica Bell, learning Holtzman was homeless. Searching camps, Gibbs befriends Marine LCpl. Bernard Williams, and finds Davey's body in the trash, with Marine SSgt. Norma Jean Pfeiffer, murdered, hands missing. From the horse's RFID, Kasie identifies stablemaster Henry Hoss. Bell receives threats, finding Pfeiffer's hands "finger pointing" at cremation ashes. The press dubs the killer, "the Military Mangler." Gibbs and Sloan review Barney's file, as a potential suspect, but he too is attacked. Standing watch, Gibbs and Barney trade stories, and catch podcaster Melissa Canon "truth bombing." Bishop suspects emergency congressional voting on veteran care funding might provide motive. Kasie pulls financials, finding Kyle Freeman privately owns Mercy Point Mobile Care, hoping for nationwide expansion. Homeless veterans Rinaldi, Jones, Pretorius, and Williams have Gibbs' "six" while Sloane videos Freeman's arrest. Meanwhile, for lying about Ziva, Vance punishes McGee, Bishop and Torres with evidence garage cleanup under technician Terry Kemper.
383	5	"Wide Awake"	Diana Valentine	Brendan Fehily	October 22, 2019	1705	11.34
NCIS investigates Marine Corporal Laney Alimonte after she wakes up from a hypnotism session for insomnia and finds a bloody gun in her fridge, linking her to a neighbor's murder. Meanwhile, Gibbs befriends his new neighbors, a single mother and her 9-year old son, after the latter’s baseball accidentally crashes through his window.
384	6	"Institutionalized"	Tony Wharmby	David J. North	November 5, 2019	1706	10.88
A petty officer's son is murdered during his own welcome-home-from-prison party. Evidence quickly points to forensic scientist Kasie Hines's lifelong best friend, Dante Brown.
385	7	"No Vacancy"	Rocky Carroll	Marco Schnabel	November 12, 2019	1707	11.65
A Marine named Aaron Shaw is beaten to death, and his body is found after a family discovers pigs eating remains. A room key leads NCIS to the Monarch Motel in Virginia, where the attic contains hidden cameras trained on every room through air vents. The investigation links the setup to a blackmail scheme targeting a congressman, handled by a former NSA worker connected to a Russian spy operation.
386	8	"Musical Chairs"	Michael Zinberg	Kate Torgovnick May	November 19, 2019	1708	11.12
The team investigates the apparent suicide-turned-murder of an elite Navy band member, while McGee steps up as lead after Gibbs abruptly leaves.
387	9	"IRL"	Terrence O'Hara	Christopher J. Waild	November 26, 2019	1709	11.06
The team investigates the murder of a petty officer which was live-streamed on a gaming app. Concurrently, Gibbs looks after his young neighbor Phineas.
388	10	"The North Pole"	James Whitmore Jr.	Gina Lucita Monreal	December 17, 2019	1710	11.10
Part 1 of 2: Gibbs helps Phineas's mother, Sarah, with a plumbing issue and notices a cut on her hand. She brushes it off as scraping it against a pipe. Meanwhile, Ziva's landlady Odette instructs Bishop to retrieve a flash drive at a club in exchange for $100k, but instead of handing it to Odette (revealed to have been fired from a special CIA operation), she presents it to the team. The lone file on the drive is a picture of an unidentified man dragging Ziva's friend Adam Eshel into an abandoned factory. Flashbacks show Ziva in the time elapsed from Eli's farmhouse explosion. The investigation reveals that the "Sahar" killed previously is an impostor. Gibbs and Ziva arrive too late to save Adam, but he tells them that the real Sahar is "someone you know" before dying. They come to realize Adam was talking to Gibbs instead of Ziva, leading them to the conclusion that Sahar is Sarah, and Gibbs is forced to kill her during her confrontation with Ziva. Odette offers "special training" to Bishop at Ziva's office, and Gibbs reluctantly heads upstairs at his house to tell Phineas about his mother.
389	11	"In the Wind"	Rocky Carroll	Scott Williams	January 7, 2020	1711	10.39
Part 2 of 2: Gibbs gets deeply and personally involved in a case when Phineas goes missing, to the concern of his team regarding his well-being. The case also hits home with Torres, having busted a child trafficking ring while deep undercover. Victor Mir, the club owner who NCIS has crossed paths with before, is revealed to be Halabi, a man working in a terrorist ring with the brother of Phineas’s biological father, and the team arrests him before he can take Phineas to his uncle in Libya. Phineas is then reunited with his foster parents, from whom he was separated when his mother lied to him about them not wanting him anymore. Ziva then bids her farewells to the team as Jimmy prepares to take her to the airport so she can fly to Paris and reunite with her family.
390	12	"Flight Plan"	Tawnia McKiernan	Brendan Fehily	January 14, 2020	1712	10.12
USS Franklin D. Roosevelt off the coast of North Carolina: AC Amelia Garcia alerts Lt. Lonnie Franklin that Lt. Rebecca Weeks' F-18 has "gone wandering." Commander Marshall May hears her apology before Weeks nosedives. Weeks' bunkmate, weapons systems officer LTJG Harper Logan, takes Gibbs and Bishop to their quarters, finding quartermaster PO1 Fisher Patrick's corpse. Torres learns they were dating. Palmer concludes homicide by oxycodone. Logan implicates Weeks, claiming Patrick dumped her. Kasie deduces Weeks faked her death. Store-owner Bobby Dale Douglas confirms she is alive; she stole his motorcycle. Vance has NCHP Col. Bill Timmons arrange checkpoints. UnSecNav Jennifer Leo quips, "she used a $60 million-dollar warplane as her getaway vehicle." Weeks flies her godfather LCdr. Jack Briggs' plane to North Carolina. Telling Gibbs, she is doing his job, she leaves in Carmen Lorenzo's junkyard Subaru after removing the ECS from May's car, in which his wife Jill died. Police report indicated no skidmarks. Finding the Subaru at Norfolk, Captain Henry Nikolai discovers May missing. McGee traces May's laptop. Weeks holds May at gunpoint demanding his laptop password, believing he killed Jill remotely. Gibbs talks her down. May deduces who killed Patrick; Bishop elicits Logan's confession.
391	13	"Sound Off"	William Webb	Lisa Di Trolio	January 21, 2020	1713	11.36
A body belonging to retired gunnery sergeant Daniel Backer is found at a drone testing site after a missile strike obliterates the building. Marine Staff Sergeant Diana Murphy (Backer's ex-girlfriend) becomes the prime suspect after she disappears and fired the missile against orders. Gibbs discovers Diana is deaf due to a hidden experimental sonic weapon accident caused by Backer, and Backer was actually murdered before the missile strike.
392	14	"On Fire"	Mark Horowitz	David J. North & Steven D. Binder	January 28, 2020	1714	12.12
While Torres and Bishop are out jogging, Torres is hit by a speeding car. As Torres is comatose, NCIS and a vengeful Bishop must navigate a political minefield involving Xavier Zolotov, the spoiled son of an influential Russian family. During the investigation, the team finds Zolotov murdered, presumably by his girlfriend, who was a material suspect in Torres's previous undercover assignment years earlier. A strand of blonde hair is found at the crime scene (the girlfriend is blonde), leading the team to suspect her, though McGee is uneasy that Bishop may have followed through with her intention to kill Zolotov. However, after she confirms she did not do so at the end of the episode, McGee begins to suspect that Gibbs may have killed Zolotov to protect her.
393	15	"Lonely Hearts"	Michael Zinberg	Marco Schnabel	February 11, 2020	1715	11.75
After Molly catches Chet poaching deer on her land, she discovers the corpse of Capt. Alan Wales, pierced through the heart with an arrow. On Wales' phone, McGee finds the Fleet Date app for Navy personnel, leading NCIS to JAG Corps Attorney Stacy Gordon. Hearing screams, they enter her house, but find her current lover, Captain Phillip Brooks (from "Fallout" and "Third Wheel"). Her alibi checks out. Kasie discovers a second MPD murder case with the same M.O.. They compare notes with Detective Tom Logan. Learning CPO Craig Olson also dated Gordon, who cannot alibi, she becomes their primary suspect. Since her husband, Mark Tucker, also died, they question Sheriff Mary Talbot. Finding hair in the fletching, they enlist Phil to acquire Stacy's hair for comparison, but she catches him, ruining their relationship. Kasie cannot match DNA to Morgan, but finds methamphetamine leading NCIS to nutrition store owner Matthew Duques, who admits to lacing his supplements, but to not murder. After Phil and Stacy are kidnapped, NCIS must save them from Morgan's lovelorn stalker, Logan. Meanwhile, Sloane has a secret Valentine's Day admirer, and Torres struggles with performance-hindering pain (after events in "On Fire").
394	16	"Ephemera"	Diana Valentine	Christopher J. Waild	February 18, 2020	1716	11.91
The team investigates the apparent suicide of a retired Navy officer who left behind a rare, potentially stolen coin.
395	17	"In a Nutshell"	Michael Zinberg	Katie White	March 10, 2020	1717	10.75
Talking with Dylan, Whitley drives over PO3 Noah O'Donnell's corpse. Ducky uncovers bullet wounds. Bishop finds a "double homicide" article about Noah's parents a decade earlier. Investigating, Detective John Fioscher says, "find the bullets, I'll back off." Palmer and McGee learn, all three murders had the same M.O. – bullets were removed with long tweezers. Noah's self-defense "buddy" Porter Brandt suggests examining their condemned house. In a backyard shed, they find younger sister Claire O'Donnell's dollhouses, depicting crime scenes that Ducky dubs "modern-day nutshells," after Frances Glessner Lee's book, The Nutshell Studies of Unexplained Death. Finding long tweezers, Claire becomes a suspect. Gibbs questions Ducky's friend Henry Bennett at the Historical Society's Miniature Enthusiasts Group. Dylan posts crime scene video, endangering Claire, who they arrest where Noah's body was found. She believes Noah, a Quantico intelligence specialist, investigated their parents' case, making himself a target. Kasie matches Noah's blood to tweezers in Claire's workshop. Claire challenges Gibbs to solve her nutshells. Viewing Noah's nutshell of fire victim Louise Fitzgerald, Gibbs concludes, "We've been looking into the wrong case." Since Fitzgerald took Noah's martial arts class, NCIS arrests electrician Brandt, who copycat killed Noah for inquiring about electrical fires.
396	18	"Schooled"	Alrick Riley	Kate Torgovnick May & Steven D. Binder	March 24, 2020	1718	13.22
Edgar and Allen discover the corpse of PO1 Jeremy Whistler in the water during an annual Duck Dunk race. His wife Ramona insists, Jeremy is highly-regarded. Beverly Berkshire's death threat on Jeremy's phone, leads NCIS to Aspire Technical College, whose Dean Neil Patterson tries to sell them on enrollment. Berkshire claims Jeremy is the notorious hacker, TerrorCaster. His knife wound leads them to fellow hacker Taye Tanner, aka TerrorPollux, who stabbed Jeremy, believing he stole proceeds from their online security software. But Taye's alibi is verified. Finding the college deserted, NCIS discovers Portland Douglas was not actually a student, but rather a conman who killed Jeremy for discovering his trade school fraud scheme. Meanwhile, Sloane’s biological daughter Faith Tolliver, who is engaged and starting fertility treatments, requests her father’s medical history, unintentionally forcing Sloane to confront Rick Martel, who had raped her after a college party. Sloane threatens Martel to give Faith his medical history, but lie regarding her conception and never contact her again. But Faith deduces the truth and thanks Jack for protecting her. Note: The episode is followed by CBS Cares public service announcement for the National Sexual Assault Hotline, presented by Maria Bello who portrays Dr. Jacqueline "Jack" Sloane.
397	19	"Blarney"	Rocky Carroll	Scott Williams	March 31, 2020	1719	13.65
Jimmy and Kasie are held hostage in the diner Gibbs frequently visits after three armed burglars mismanage a heist at a nearby jewelry store. The leader kills their driver beforehand due to the latter spilling details to his wife, who later relays it to Vance and Sloane. A cook at the diner shoots one of the burglars in an attempt to free the patrons, later resulting in the crook’s death and his fellow robbers forcing Jimmy to cut out the diamonds he had swallowed. This gives Jimmy and Kasie the idea to convince them they are bleeding internally from broken glass, saving the other patrons and ending the hostage situation.
398	20	"The Arizona"	James Whitmore Jr.	Gina Lucita Monreal	April 14, 2020	1720	13.49
The team tries to verify the identity of Joe Smith, who claims to have served on the U.S.S. Arizona during the Pearl Harbor attacks and wants his ashes interred there when he dies. Meanwhile, McGee unwittingly gets roped into a family reunion of people he doesn't know. Note: This episode was dedicated to the Pearl Harbor victims as well as the first responders and those on the frontlines battling the COVID-19 pandemic.

== Production ==
NCIS was renewed for a seventeenth season on April 11, 2019.

On March 13, 2020, CBS announced that the filming of season 17 had been suspended due to the COVID-19 pandemic. Storylines planned for what would have been Episodes 21–24 are confirmed to have been integrated into the Season 18 episodes "Everything Starts Somewhere" and "Sunburn." Executive producer Frank Cardea teased a "very surprising ending" that was altered due to the pandemic. Fans have speculated that this was either the exit of Maria Bello's Jacqueline Sloane (which was postponed until the Season 18 episode "True Believer") or an on-screen reunion of former main cast members Michael Weatherly and Cote de Pablo as Tony DiNozzo and Ziva David, though neither theory was confirmed.

This is the first of two seasons not to feature Joe Spano in his recurring role as Tobias Fornell (the other being season 22), though he is mentioned numerous times in the season's eighth episode, "Musical Chairs." The fact that the opening arc of the next season would conclude the episode's arc regarding Fornell and his daughter, which began in the Season 16 finale, has led to speculation that this story was intended to be the basis for the unproduced final episode of Season 17.

== Broadcast ==
The seventeenth season of NCIS premiered on September 24, 2019.

== Ratings ==
Viewership and ratings per episode of NCIS season 17
No.	Title	Air date	Rating/share (18–49)	Viewers (millions)	DVR (18–49)	DVR viewers (millions)	Total (18–49)	Total viewers (millions)
1	"Out of the Darkness"	September 24, 2019	1.3/7	12.57	0.7	4.36	2.0	16.93
2	"Into the Light"	October 1, 2019	1.3/7	12.51	0.6	4.02	1.9	16.54
3	"Going Mobile"	October 8, 2019	1.1/6	11.19	0.7	4.05	1.8	15.25
4	"Someone Else's Shoes"	October 15, 2019	1.1/5	10.87	0.6	3.63	1.7	14.50
5	"Wide Awake"	October 22, 2019	1.1/5	11.34	0.6	3.71	1.7	15.05
6	"Institutionalized"	November 5, 2019	1.0/5	10.88	0.6	3.80	1.6	14.68
7	"No Vacancy"	November 12, 2019	1.1/5	11.65	0.6	3.51	1.7	15.16
8	"Musical Chairs"	November 19, 2019	1.0/5	11.12	0.6	3.50	1.6	14.62
9	"IRL"	November 26, 2019	1.1/6	11.06	0.6	3.74	1.7	14.80
10	"The North Pole"	December 17, 2019	1.0/5	11.10	0.6	3.86	1.6	14.96
11	"In the Wind"	January 7, 2020	1.0/5	10.39	0.6	3.64	1.6	14.03
12	"Flight Plan"	January 14, 2020	1.0/5	10.12	0.7	4.10	1.7	14.22
13	"Sound Off"	January 21, 2020	1.0/6	11.36	0.6	3.67	1.6	15.03
14	"On Fire"	January 28, 2020	1.1/6	12.12	0.5	3.39	1.6	15.51
15	"Lonely Hearts"	February 11, 2020	1.0/5	11.75	0.7	3.80	1.7	15.55
16	"Ephemera"	February 18, 2020	1.1/6	11.91	0.6	3.59	1.7	15.50
17	"In a Nutshell"	March 10, 2020	1.0/6	10.75	0.5	3.56	1.5	14.31
18	"Schooled"	March 24, 2020	1.3/6	13.22	0.5	3.33	1.8	16.55
19	"Blarney"	March 31, 2020	1.3/6	13.65	0.5	2.91	1.8	16.56
20	"The Arizona"	April 14, 2020	1.3/6	13.49	0.5	3.32	1.8	16.82
