= Yasmine Al-Bustami =

American actress

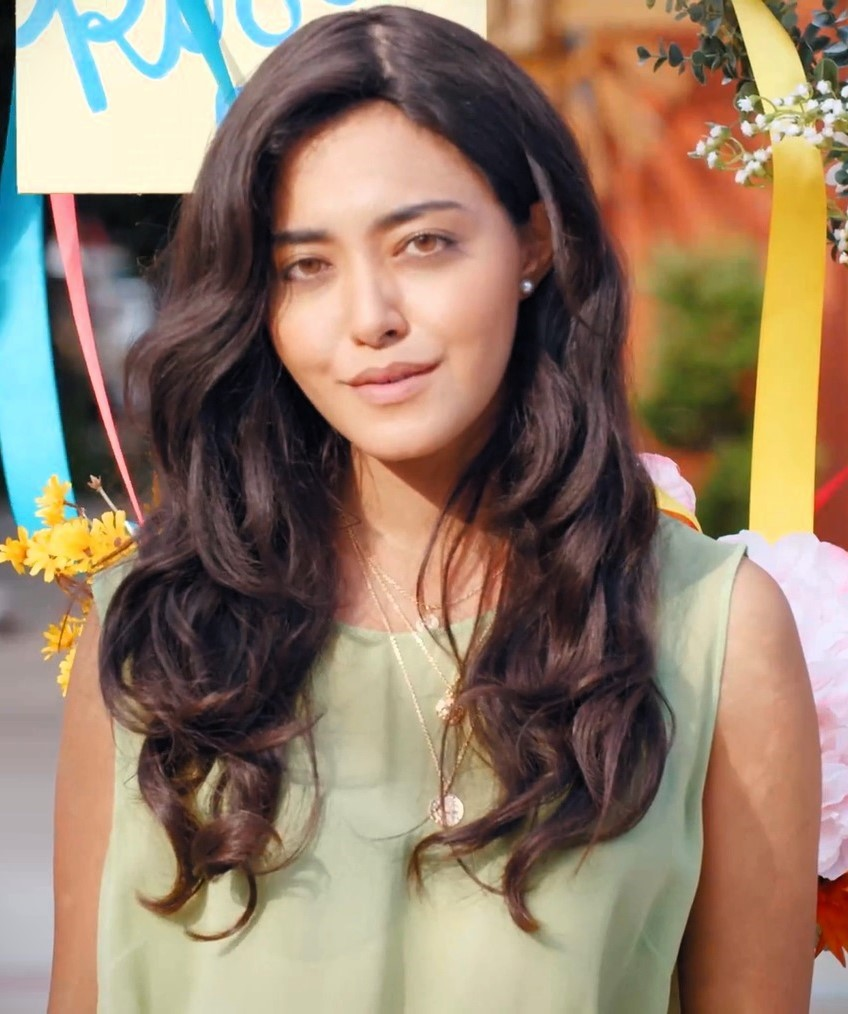
- Al-Bustami in Breakfast at the Bodega, 2022 short film
- Born: Abu Dhabi, United Arab Emirates
- Citizenship: United States,United Arab Emirates
- Occupation: Actress
- Years active: 2013–present

Yasmine Al-Bustami (Arabic: ياسمين البسطامي : Yāsmīn al-Busṭāmī) is an American-Emirati actress. She is most known for her roles on The Originals, NCIS: Hawaiʻi, and The Chosen.

== Early life ==
Yasmine Al-Bustami was born in Abu Dhabi, United Arab Emirates, to a Palestinian-Jordanian father and Filipina mother, but moved with her family to Texas at the age of three. After receiving a degree in Finance, she decided to enter the world of entertainment, and improved her studies in Chicago, Illinois.

== Career ==
In 2013, Al-Bustami made her television debut in The Originals as the recurring role of Monique Deveraux, a season one villain.

In 2014, she guest starred in a season 3 episode of Nashville playing the role of Delissa Birch.

In 2015, Al-Bustami guest starred in a season 4 episode of Switched at Birth.

In 2016-2017, she had a recurring role on season 2 of The Inspectors. In 2017, she appeared in the music video of John Legend's single, "Surefire." Al-Bustami also had a role in the feature film You Get Me. She was a series regular in the CW Seed series I Ship It playing Sasha.

In 2018, Al-Bustami was cast as a series regular in the Alpha streaming service live interactive sci-fi series Orbital Redux playing the role of Tommie.

In 2019, season 2 of I Ship It was released with Al-Bustami back as Sasha. The season premiered again on CW Seed, but also premiered this time on The CW.

From 2021, she reprised the role of Ramah in multiple episodes of The Chosen's second, third and fourth seasons, after appearing in a season one episode in 2019. She was also cast as a series regular in NCIS spin-off NCIS: Hawaiʻi playing the role of Special Agent Lucy Tara.

== Filmography ==
Television/TV films
Year	Title	Role	Notes
2013–14	The Originals	Monique Deveraux	Recurring role, 10 episodes
2014	Film School Shorts	Anoosheh	Episode: "Life During Wartime"
2014	Nashville	Delissa Birch	Episode: "First to Have a Second Chance"
2016	The Inspectors	Amy	2 episodes on CBS
2018	Orbital Redux	Tommie	8 episodes
2019	S.W.A.T.	Amina	Episode: "Kingdom"
2019–25	The Chosen	Ramah	Main cast
2021–24	NCIS: Hawaiʻi	Special Agent Lucy Tara	Main cast
2023	NCIS: Los Angeles	Special Agent Lucy Tara	Crossover: "A Long Time Coming"
2025	The Chosen Adventures	Ramah (voice role)	Episode: “Why, God!?”

Web
Year	Title	Role	Notes
2015	Nessyane	Nour	Series Regular
2016–19	I Ship It	Sasha	CW Seed Series

Film
Year	Title	Role	Notes
2010	Unimaginable	Robin	Short
2010	The Neighbors Horror Saga	Kari-Tale of the Pawn	Short
2010	Flower	Grac	Short
2011	Road to Peshawar	Anoosheh	Short
2012	The Symphony of Silence	Monica	Short
2012	The Package	Guns	Short
2012	Walking the Halls	Student	
2013	Reborn	Ingrid	
2013	M15F1T5	Preacher Boy	
2013	Ladies' Man: A Made Movie	Dahlia	MTV Productions
2013	When It's Your Time	Alana	Short
2013	R	Rana	Short
2015	SuperNovas	Afsheen	Short
2015	Unimaginable	Robin	
2015	Angie + Zahra	Zahra	
2016	You Get Me	Grace	
