= NCIS: Hawaiʻi =

American police procedural television series

- Also known as: NCIS: Hawaii
- Genre: Police procedural; Drama
- Created by: Christopher Silber; Jan Nash; Matt Bosack
- Based on: NCIS by: Donald P. Bellisario; Don McGill
- Showrunner: Matt Bosack
- Starring: Vanessa Lachey; Alex Tarrant; Noah Mills; Yasmine Al-Bustami; Jason Antoon; Tori Anderson; Kian Talan
- Composer: Tree Adams
- Country of origin: United States
- Original language: English
- No. of seasons: 3
- No. of episodes: 54 (list of episodes)

Production
- Executive producers: Christopher Silber; Jan Nash; Matt Bosack; Larry Teng
- Producers: Randy Sutter; Joshua Rexon; Yalun Tu; Vanessa Lachey
- Production location: Oahu, Hawaii
- Cinematography: Kurt Jones
- Running time: 44–45 minutes
- Production companies: Harp to the Party Productions; Close to the Land Productions; CBS Studios

Original release
- Network: CBS
- Release: September 20, 2021 – May 6, 2024

Related
- Hawaii Five-0; NCIS; NCIS: Los Angeles; NCIS: New Orleans; NCIS: Sydney; NCIS: Origins; NCIS: Tony & Ziva; NCIS: New York

NCIS: Hawaiʻi is an American police procedural television series that premiered on CBS on September 20, 2021. It stars Vanessa Lachey as Jane Tennant, the Special Agent in Charge of a fictional team of special agents from the Naval Criminal Investigative Service based in Hawaii. The show is a spin-off of the series NCIS and the fourth series in the NCIS franchise. The series was created by Christopher Silber, Jan Nash, and Matt Bosack who also serve as writers and executive producers alongside Larry Teng who directed multiple episodes. The series also stars Alex Tarrant, Noah Mills, Yasmine Al-Bustami, Jason Antoon, Tori Anderson and Kian Talan.

In February 2023, the series was renewed for a third season, which then premiered on February 12, 2024. Filming for the third season began on December 4, 2023.

In April 2024, the series was cancelled after three seasons, making it the third series in the NCIS franchise to end after NCIS: Los Angeles and NCIS: New Orleans; to date, it is the shortest-lived series in the franchise (excluding NCIS: Tony & Ziva), with the series finale airing on May 6, 2024.

== Premise ==
The series follows a fictional team of Naval Criminal Investigative Service agents who work out of the Pearl Harbor Field Office, which is led by Special Agent in Charge Jane Tennant. The team Investigates crimes related to the military and national security.

== Cast ==
=== Main ===
- Vanessa Lachey as Jane Tennant, the first female Special Agent-in-Charge of the NCIS: Hawaiʻi Field Office
  - Ronda Kahana Williams as young Jane Tennant.
- Alex Tarrant as Kai Holman, a new NCIS agent on the team who recently returned home to care for his father
- Noah Mills as Jesse Boone, Tennant's confidant and second-in-command, a former homicide detective in Washington, D.C., who knows the islands' hiking trails well
- Yasmine Al-Bustami as Lucy Tara, the junior field agent of NCIS: Hawaiʻi, and Kate's love-interest turned girlfriend
- Jason Antoon as Ernie Malik, NCIS: Hawaiʻi's cyber intelligence specialist
- Tori Anderson as Kathrine "Kate" Marie Whistler, a Defense Intelligence Agency (DIA) Officer and Lucy's love interest-turned-girlfriend
- Kian Talan as Alex Tennant (seasons 1–2; guest season 3), Jane's eldest child

=== Recurring ===
- Mahina Napoleon as Julie Tennant, Jane's youngest child
- Moses Goods as Wally Holman, Kai's father
- Anthony Ruivivar as Daniel Tennant, Jane's ex-husband and father of her children
- Enver Gjokaj as Captain Joe Milius, Deputy Chief of Staff to Commander and Jane's love interest
- Mark Gessner as Neil Pike, a Coast Guard Investigative Service Special Agent
- Danielle Zalopany as Hina Holman, Kai's sister
- Julie White as Maggie Shaw, former CIA officer and Jane's previous mentor and friend
- Sharif Atkins as Captain Norman 'Boom Boom' Gates, the team's EOD technician
- Seana Kofoed as Commander (Dr.) Carla Chase, a medical examiner assigned to Joint Base Pearl Harbor–Hickam
- LL Cool J as Sam Hanna (special guest star: season 2–3), NCIS Senior Field Agent, Second in Command of the Los Angeles OSP

=== Notable guests ===
- Beulah Koale as David Sola, a New Zealand intelligence specialist

=== Crossover ===
==== NCIS ====
- Wilmer Valderrama as Nick Torres, NCIS Special Agent who shares a past with Tennant
- Katrina Law as Jessica Knight, NCIS Special Agent
- Diona Reasonover as Kasie Hines, Forensic Specialist for the Washington, D.C. team
- Gary Cole as Alden Parker, NCIS Supervisory Special Agent of the Washington, D.C. MCRT
- Brian Dietzen as Dr. Jimmy Palmer, Chief Medical Examiner for the Washington, D.C. team

==== NCIS: Los Angeles ====
- Chris O'Donnell as Grisha "G." Callen, NCIS Supervisory Special Agent of the Office of Special Projects in Los Angeles
- LL Cool J as Sam Hanna, NCIS Senior Field Agent, Second in Command of the OSP

== Episodes ==
Season	Episodes	Originally released	
Season	Episodes	First released	Last released
1	22	September 20, 2021	May 23, 2022
2	22	September 19, 2022	May 22, 2023
3	10	February 12, 2024	May 6, 2024

== Production ==
=== Development ===
On February 16, 2021, anonymous sources told The Hollywood Reporter that deals were being finalized on a potential fourth series in the NCIS franchise, titled NCIS: Hawaii, as it neared a straight-to-series order from CBS. They also said that series would be created and executive-produced by Christopher Silber, Jan Nash, and Matt Bosack, with Silber and Nash also serving as co-showrunners. Unlike the other series in the franchise, it is not planned to start with a backdoor pilot within another series. The series location would also create potential crossover opportunities with CBS's other Hawaii-based drama, Magnum P.I. NCIS: Los Angeles previously crossed over with Magnum P.I.'s now concluded sister series, Hawaii Five-0, in 2012. The sources also said that the producers had already started looking for a director for a pilot and were working on hiring writers.

In early April 2021, it was reported that the series was expected to be picked up for the 2021–22 television season. On April 23, 2021, CBS officially ordered NCIS: Hawaii to series. Larry Teng was also announced to be executive producing the pilot episode. Bosack, Nash, and Silber wrote the pilot episode for the series. The series name was also officially changed to NCIS: Hawaiʻi, adding a ʻokina in an effort to reflect the official spelling used in the Hawaiian language. On October 11, 2021, CBS picked up the series for a full season. On January 3, 2022, it was announced that a crossover with the nineteenth season of parent series NCIS would be taking place on March 28, 2022. Showrunners of both series had previously mentioned crossing over and CBS Entertainment President Kelly Kahl had stated that discussion about a crossover would start after NCIS: Hawaiʻi finished its first batch of episodes. On March 31, 2022, CBS renewed the series for a second season which premiered on September 19, 2022. The second season contained two further crossovers, the first once more with NCIS and the second with both NCIS and NCIS: Los Angeles. On February 21, 2023, CBS renewed the series for a third season, which then premiered on February 12, 2024.

=== Casting ===
On April 7, 2021, it was reported that CBS was looking to cast a female lead for the NCIS: Hawaii making it the first series in the franchise to do so. The character for the female lead was tentatively named Jane Tennant, and casting for the role as well as other principal characters began around the same time. On April 30, 2021, it was announced that Vanessa Lachey was the first to be cast as a series regular, in the role of Jane Tennant. Meanwhile, Yasmine Al-Bustami and Jason Antoon were also cast as series regulars to portray Lucy and Ernie, respectively. It was later announced that Noah Mills had joined the cast as Jesse. Tori Anderson and Kian Talan were cast as series regulars in the roles of Kate Whistler and Alex. On July 8, 2021, Alex Tarrant joined the main cast as Kai and Enver Gjokaj was announced to be recurring as Joe Milius.

Former Hawaii Five-0 star Beulah Koale was cast as a guest star in the series' first two-part story. NCIS stars Wilmer Valderrama and Katrina Law, the latter of whom also starred on Hawaii Five-0, appeared as their NCIS characters in a crossover event. Gary Cole and Diona Reasonover also appeared as their NCIS characters in the crossover event.

=== Filming ===
The series is planned to use the production facilities built for Hawaii Five-0, which concluded in 2020. For the pilot episode, Larry Teng served as the director while Yasu Tanida provided cinematography work. Filming for the series began at an undisclosed location on the North Shore of Oahu with a traditional Hawaiian blessing on June 16, 2021. Two days later on June 18, 2021, filming took place at Joint Base Pearl Harbor–Hickam. Both the first and second episodes had concluded filming by July 22, 2021.

On January 25, 2022, both Koale and Tarrant performed a haka on the NCIS Hawaii office film set to honor the work the crew has done in filming for the first season. The first season concluded filming on March 19, 2022.

Filming for the third season began on December 4, 2023.

=== Cancelation ===
On April 26, 2024, CBS canceled the series, after three seasons. Cancellation of the series had negative effects on Hawaii's film industry, leaving 350–400 people without employment. According to CBS, the cancellation was made due to financial costs, the show ratings, and the network's TV show lineup for the 2024–25 schedule, as well as the network limiting the amount of shows from the NCIS franchise for its schedule, especially with the announcement of NCIS: Origins.

The cancellation was met with backlash from fans, who later started campaigning to save the show by starting petitions such as one titled as "Save NCIS: Hawaiʻi on CBS" on Change.org. However, the petitions were unsuccessful.

== Release ==
CBS announced its fall broadcast schedule on May 19, 2021, for the 2021–22 television season, with the new series on Mondays at 10:00 p.m. ET, immediately following parent series NCIS. The first teaser trailer was released on the same date featuring Lachey speaking about the premise and her role on the series. On July 12, 2021, CBS announced a series premiere date of September 20, 2021. TVLine released exclusive first look promotional photos from the series three days later on July 15, 2021. A second teaser trailer was released in August 2021, featuring a joint promo with NCIS. The series' twelfth episode, "Spies, Part 1", aired after the AFC Divisional Playoff Game on January 23, 2022, with "Spies, Part 2" airing the following day in the series' regular timeslot.

== Reception ==
=== Critical response ===
On Metacritic the series has a score of 48% based on reviews from 6 critics, indicating "mixed or average reviews". On Rotten Tomatoes season one has an approval rating of 60% based on reviews from 5 critics. Caroline Framke of Variety gave the premiere a nuanced review and wrote: "The show still feels of a piece with 'NCIS' proper, military jargon, efficient dialogue, flashy mysteries and all. If you're already a fan, it's worth giving a shot. If not, there are plenty of other shows in the sea." On IMDb the series has a rating of 6.7 on 10 based on 8 700 critics.

=== Ratings ===
Viewership and ratings per season of NCIS: Hawaiʻi
Season	Timeslot (ET)	Episodes	First aired		Last aired		TV season	Viewership rank	Avg. viewers (millions)
Season	Timeslot (ET)	Episodes	Date	Viewers (millions)	Date	Viewers (millions)	TV season	Viewership rank	Avg. viewers (millions)
1	Monday 10:00 p.m.	22	September 20, 2021	6.59	May 23, 2022	5.47	2021–22	14	8.28
2	Monday 10:00 p.m.	22	September 19, 2022	5.31	May 22, 2023	5.10	2022–23	16	7.53
3	Monday 10:00 p.m.	10	February 12, 2024	5.56	May 6, 2024	5.41	2023–24	14	7.79
