= Vanessa Lachey =

Filipino model, actress, and presenter (born 1980)

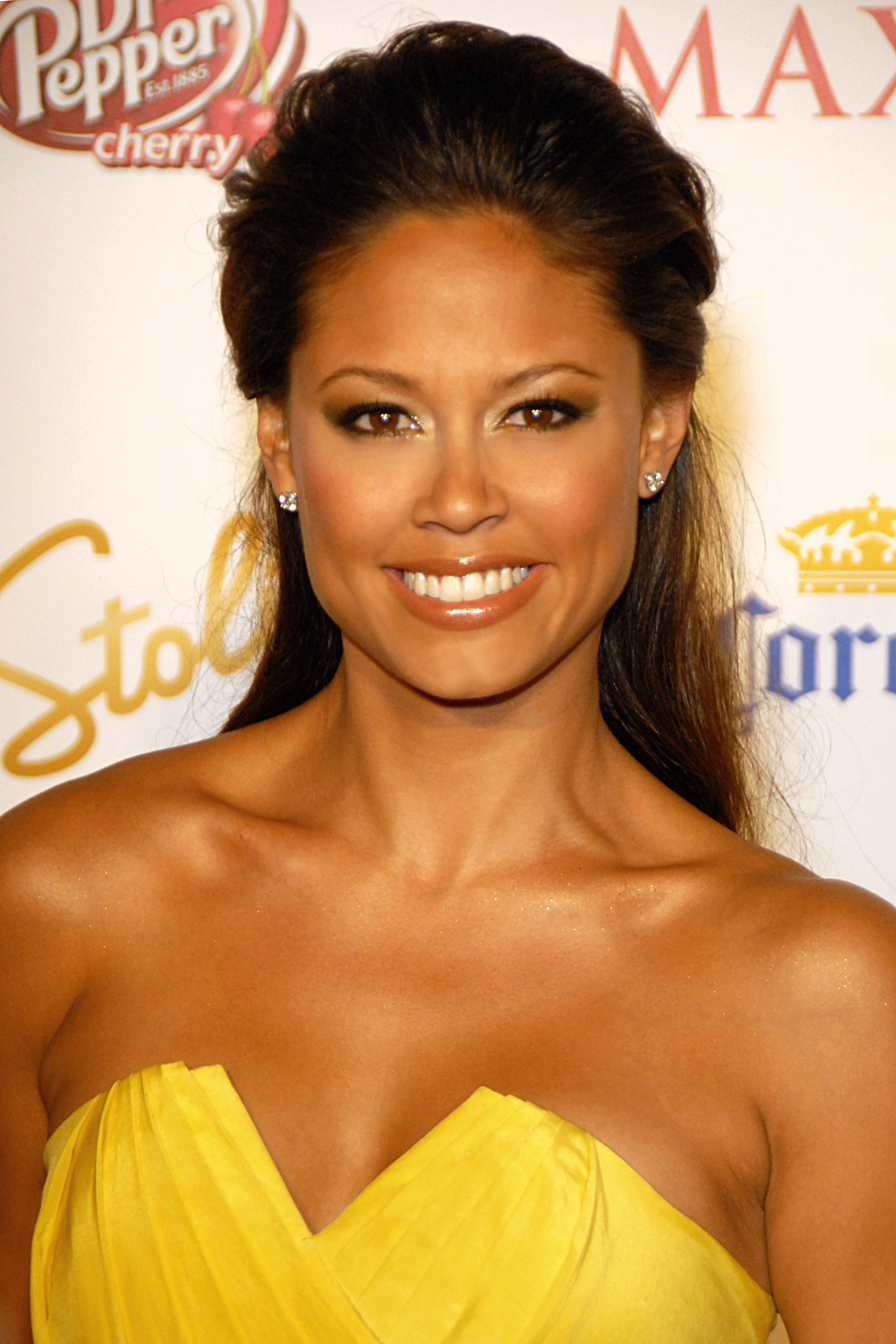
- Vanessa Lachey at Maxim magazine's 10th Annual Hot 100 Celebration, Santa Monica, California on May 13, 2009
- Born: Vanessa Joy Minnillo; November 9, 1980 (age 46); Angeles City, Philippines
- Occupations: Television personality; host; actress; model
- Years active: 1985–present
- Spouse: Nick Lachey (m. 2011)
- Children: 3
- Beauty pageant titleholder
- Title: Miss South Carolina Teen USA 1998; Miss Teen USA 1998
- Major competitions: Miss South Carolina Teen USA 1998 (Winner); Miss Teen USA 1998 (Winner)

Vanessa Joy Lachey (née Minnillo; born November 9, 1980) is a Filipino model, actress, and presenter. She was named Miss Teen USA in 1998. She has been a New York–based correspondent for Entertainment Tonight and hosted Total Request Live on MTV. She has starred in two network sitcoms and hosted various competition and reality shows. Lachey portrayed the lead role in the CBS crime drama television series NCIS: Hawaiʻi (2021–2024) for three seasons.

== Early life ==
Vanessa Joy Minnillo was born at the 13th Air Force Regional Medical Center at Clark Air Base in Angeles City, Philippines. Her father, Vincent Charles Minnillo, is an American citizen who was born in Cleveland, Ohio, while her mother, Helen Ramos Bercero, was born in Manila, Philippines. Minnillo has an adopted brother who is two years older. Her family moved frequently because of her father's service in the Air Force. She lived in Washington, California, Nevada, Florida, Germany, and Japan and attended eleven schools in nine years. Minnillo's parents separated in 1983 and divorced in 1986. Her mother left the family when Vanessa was 9 years old.

Minnillo's parents both remarried. She and her brother Vincent Jr. relocated to Turkey with their mother and stepfather. By 1991, in the wake of Operation Desert Shield, they returned to their father's home, eventually settling in Charleston, South Carolina, where Minnillo attended the Roman Catholic Bishop England High School. From then on, she lived with her father and stepmother, Donna. She has said she had "a very rocky, challenging, and tumultuous childhood."

== Career ==
=== 1998–2020: Beauty pageants and television hosting ===
Lachey was crowned Miss South Carolina Teen USA and won the title Miss Teen USA in 1998. She was the first Miss Teen USA from South Carolina and also the first from South Carolina to be named the pageant's Miss Congeniality. She was a host on MTV's The Morning After (2003) and Total Request Live (2003–2007) and became a New York City correspondent for Entertainment Tonight in 2005. She hosted Miss Teen USA 2004 and Miss Universe 2007 beauty pageants.

After leaving MTV and Entertainment Tonight, Lachey was featured in print and web-based advertising for Bongo Jeans' Spring/Summer 2007 collection. She launched a makeup line with Flirt! Cosmetics, which debuted in August 2007 at Kohl's department stores. In May 2006, Maxim magazine ranked Lachey #15 in its annual Hot 100 issue. She has been featured on the covers of numerous magazines, including Maxim, Parents, and People.

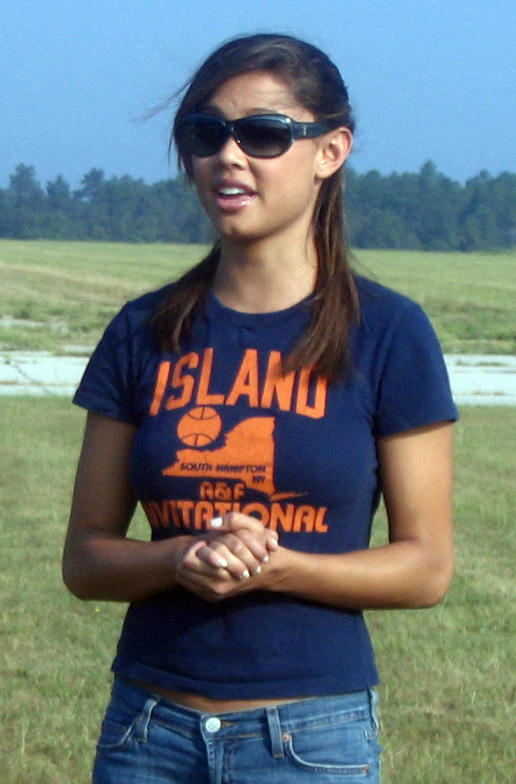
Lachey hosting Total Request Live in 2005

Lachey was a finalist in E!'s competition to replace Brooke Burke as host of Wild On!. From 2009 to 2011, she hosted ABC's TV series True Beauty. The series followed 10 contestants who competed for $100,000 and to be featured in People magazine's 100 most beautiful people issue. The series was produced by Tyra Banks and Ashton Kutcher. Lachey became a co-host of ABC's game show Wipeout in December 2011.

Early in her career, Lachey had small roles in numerous television shows, including That's Life, City Girls, 30 Rock, The Bold and the Beautiful, Psych, Hawaii Five-O and Maybe It's Me. In 2008, she portrayed Ashlee in the CBS sitcom How I Met Your Mother, in the episode "No Tomorrow". She portrayed Amy in the parody film Disaster Movie (2008) alongside Matt Lanter, Kim Kardashian, and Carmen Electra. The film was panned by critics, but was a moderate box-office success, grossing nearly $35 million against a $20 million budget. In 2009, Lachey and Kardashian acted together again, on CBS's police procedural television series CSI: NY.

In 2011, Lachey had a guest role as Carmen Chao in NBC's sitcom 30 Rock. She played Tracy in NBC's sitcom Truth Be Told (2015), about two diverse multiracial couples who are best friends, lovers and neighbors. The series ended after one season on December 25, 2015. On September 6, 2017, Lachey was announced as one of the celebrities who would take part in the 25th season of Dancing with the Stars, competing against her husband, Nick. She was paired with professional dancer Maksim Chmerkovskiy, and Chmerkovskiy's wife, Peta Murgatroyd, was paired with Nick. On October 30, Lachey and Chmerkovskiy became the seventh couple eliminated from the competition, finishing in joint seventh place.

In 2020, Lachey and her husband Nick were announced as the hosts of the Netflix series Love Is Blind. Lachey stated that the show "made literally our dreams come true in terms of being able to work together, being able to spend time together, making our marriage stronger ultimately in the end." The couple has hosted every season of the show announced to date.

=== 2021–present: NCIS: Hawaiʻi and first book ===
On April 30, 2021, it was announced that Lachey was cast as a series regular in CBS's police procedural TV series NCIS: Hawaiʻi. Lachey joined the cast in her first leading series role as Jane Tennant, the first female Special Agent in charge of the NCIS: Pearl. Her role also marked the NCIS franchise's first female lead. It is a spin-off of the long-running series NCIS, and the fourth series in the NCIS franchise. Filming for the series began on the North Shore of Oahu on June 16, 2021. The series debuted on September 20, 2021, and was canceled in April 2024. The final episode aired on May 6, 2024.

Lachey's first book, Life from Scratch: Family Traditions That Start with You, was released on November 16, 2021, by HarperCollins. Co-written with Dina Gachman, the book includes recipes, parenting tips, birthday rituals, date night ideas, and personal stories.

In 2023, she appeared in General Motors' and Netflix's Super Bowl commercial to promote electric vehicles. She was included in Variety's "40 Most Powerful Women on Reality TV in 2023" list.

== Personal life ==
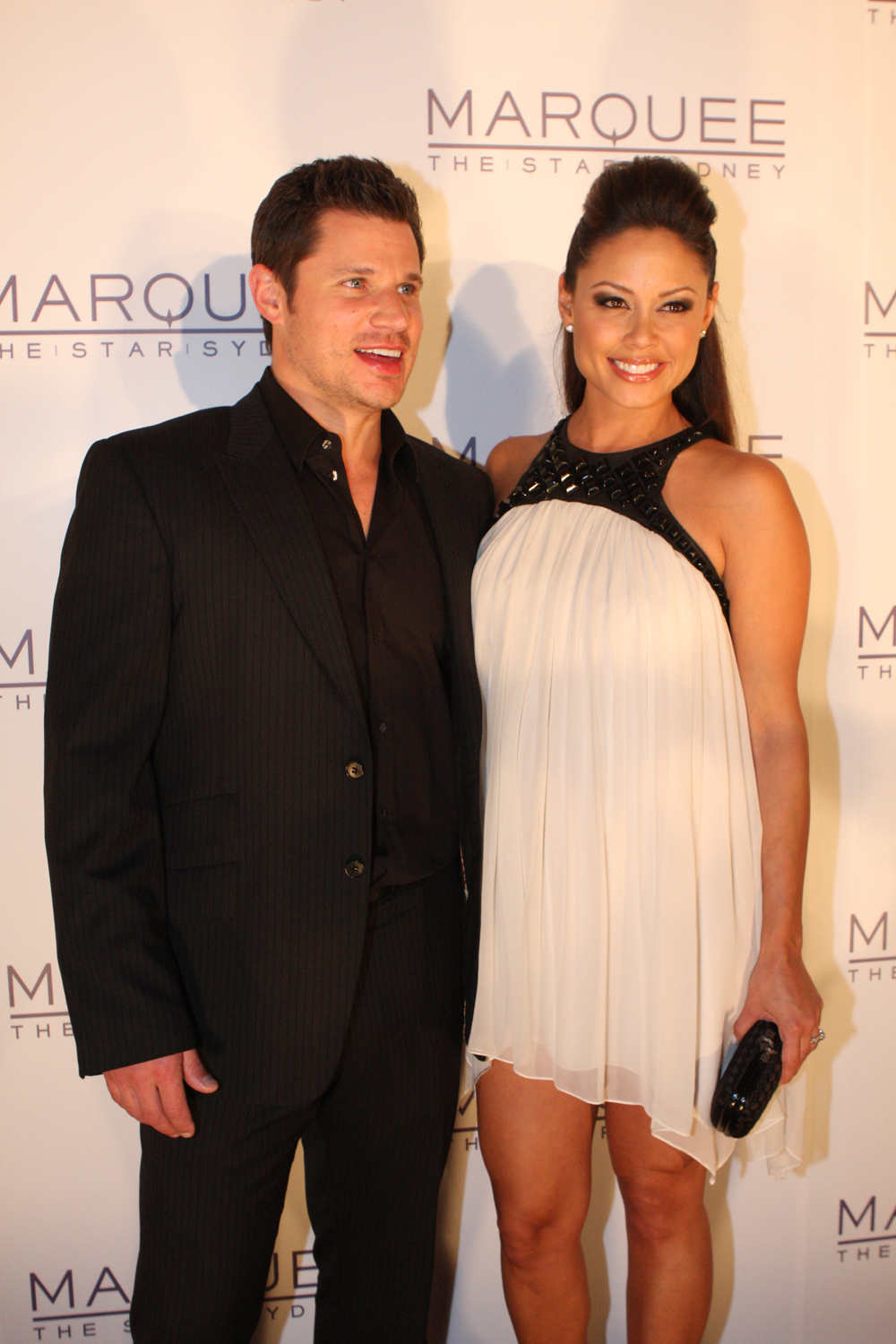
Nick and Vanessa Lachey at Marquee in Sydney, Australia, on March 30, 2012

In 2006, she began dating singer Nick Lachey after appearing in the video for his song "What's Left of Me". The couple became engaged in November 2010, and married on July 15, 2011, at Sir Richard Branson's private Necker Island in the British Virgin Islands. They were both born on November 9, seven years apart. They have three children, two sons born in September 2012 and December 2016, and one daughter born in January 2015. Their eldest son was born during the production of the fifth season of Wipeout.

== Filmography ==
=== Film ===
Year	Title	Role	Notes
2007	Fantastic Four: Rise of the Silver Surfer	Johnny's Wedding Date	
2008	Disaster Movie	Amy	
2018	A Twist of Christmas	Abby Hewitt	TV movie
2019	Christmas Unleashed	Becca Solano	TV movie
2020	Once Upon A Main Street	Amelia Lewis	

=== Television ===
Year	Title	Role	Notes
2001	The Bold and the Beautiful	Amanda Wexler	Regular Cast
2001	City Guys	Hot Girl	Episode: "Dances with Malcolm"
2001	That's Life	Cheerleader	Episode: "Oh, Crap!"
2002	Maybe It's Me	Sexy Student	Episode: "The Prom Episode: Part 2"
2008	How I Met Your Mother	Ashlee	Episode: "No Tomorrow"
2009	CSI: NY	Grace Chandler	Episode: "Second Chances"
2010	Psych	Gina	Episode: "Shawn and Gus in Drag (Racing)"
2011	30 Rock	Carmen Chao	Episode: "¡Qué Sorpresa!"
2011	Hawaii Five-0	Susan	Episode: "Powa Maka Moana"
2011	Nick & Vanessa's Dream Wedding	Herself	TLC television special; also as executive producer
2013–14	Dads	Camilla	19 episodes
2015	Lachey's: Raising the Bar	Herself	Main Cast
2015	Truth Be Told	Tracy Cooper	10 episodes
2017	Dancing with the Stars	Herself/Contestant	Contestant: season 25
2019	American Housewife	Crissy	Episode: "Liar Liar, Room on Fire"
2019	BH90210	Camille	4 episodes
2021	Call Me Kat	Tara Barnett	Recurring Cast: Season 1
2021–24	NCIS: Hawaiʻi	Jane Tennant	Main role; 54 episodes
2022–24	NCIS	Jane Tennant	Guest: Season 19 & 21, Recurring Cast: Season 20
2023	NCIS: Los Angeles	Jane Tennant	Episode: "A Long Time Coming"
2025	Krapopolis	Tia Who Smiles	Voice; Episode: “Love Trap, Baby!”

=== Music video ===
Year	Title	Artist	Role
2006	"What's Left of Me"	Nick Lachey	Love interest

=== As a television personality or host ===
Television
Year	Title	Role	Notes
2001	The 50th Annual Miss USA Pageant	Backstage Correspondent	TV special
2003	The Morning After	Host	MTV's summer series
2003–2004	Beat Seekers	Host	11 episodes
2003–2007	Total Request Live	Host	18 episodes
2004	Miss Teen USA 2004	Host	TV special
2004	The Real World: San Diego	Reunion Host	Episode: "2 Punk Rock 4 This: The Real World San Diego Reunion"
2005	The Real World: Philadelphia	Reunion Host	Episode: "Fistful of Philly: The Real World Philadelphia Reunion"
2006	High School Stories	Host	Episode: "Potty Protest"
2005–2024	Entertainment Tonight	Correspondent and Guest co-host	62 episodes
2007	Miss Universe 2007	Host	TV special
2009–2010	True Beauty	Host and Judge	16 episodes
2011–2012	Wipeout	Host	24 episodes
2017–2024	The Talk	Guest co-host	11 episodes
2017–2018	Top Chef Junior	Host	19 episodes
2018	Miss USA 2018	Co-host	TV special
2019	Miss USA 2019	Co-host	TV special
2019	Miss Universe 2019	Co-host	TV special
2019	Sugar Rush	Guest Judge	Episode: "Made with Love"
2020–present	Love Is Blind	Co-host	31 episodes
2022–present	The Ultimatum: Marry or Move On	Co-host	10 episodes
2022	I Can See Your Voice	Celebrity panelist	Episode: "Episode 10: Kandi Burruss, Vanessa Lachey, Jim Jefferies, Cheryl Hines, Adrienne Houghton"

== Awards and nominations ==
List of awards and nominations received by Vanessa Lachey
Year	Ceremony	Award	Work	Result
2006	Teen Choice Awards	Choice TV: Personality	Total Request Live; Entertainment Tonight	Nominated
2019	Guinness World Records	Most Bagged Lunches Assembled in Three Minutes (Individual) (shared with Stonyfield Organic)		Won

== Published works ==
- Lachey, Vanessa: Life from Scratch: Family Traditions That Start with You, HarperCollins, 2021.

== See also ==
- Filipinos in the New York metropolitan area
