= Brian Dietzen =

American actor (born 1977)

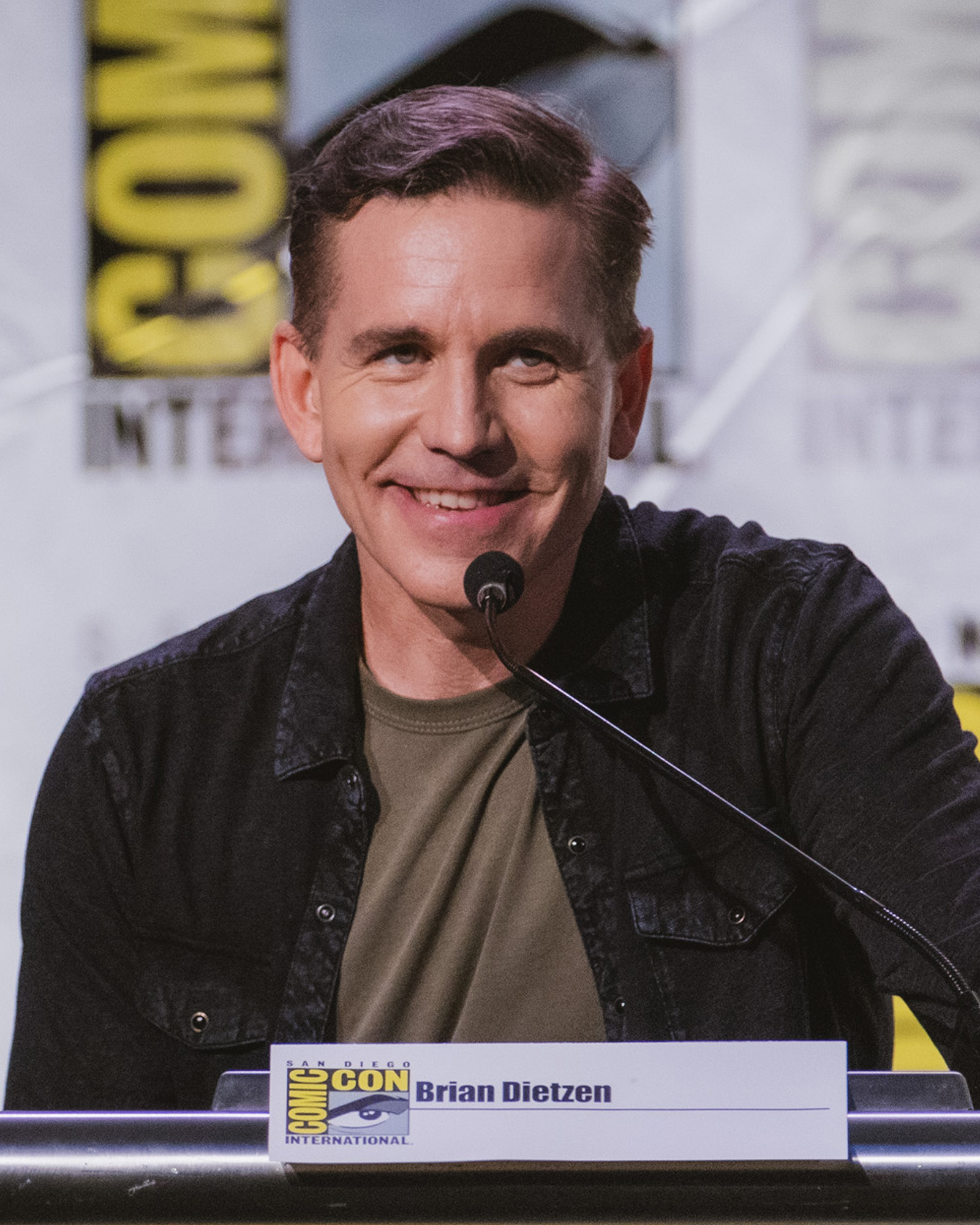
- Dietzen in 2025
- Born: November 14, 1977 (age 49); Barrington, Illinois, U.S.
- Occupation: Actor
- Years active: 2002–present
- Spouse: Kelly Scoby (m. 2004)
- Children: 2

Brian Dietzen (born November 14, 1977) is an American television actor who has played the supporting role of Dr. Jimmy Palmer on NCIS since 2004. In 2012, he was promoted to a series regular at the beginning of the show's tenth season.

== Early life ==
Dietzen moved to Colorado when he was young. He first started acting in elementary school plays. Later, he studied theater at the University of Colorado at Boulder's Bachelor of Fine Arts program.

== Career ==
Dietzen has appeared in productions of Equus and Waiting for Godot and joined The Colorado Shakespeare Festival for two years. He was cast in The WB series My Guide to Becoming a Rockstar. The part was a series regular as the drummer of the group. He later teamed up with John Riggi for a two-man show with Steve Rudnick called The Oldest Man in Show Biz.

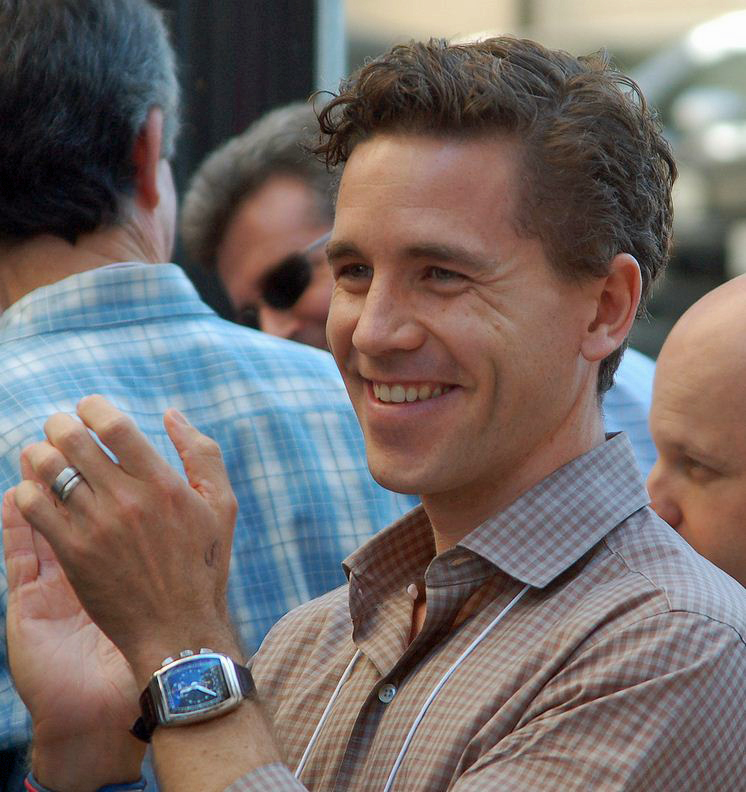
Dietzen at the Hollywood Walk of Fame in October 2012

He performed in the film From Justin to Kelly and has had a recurring role as Dr. Jimmy Palmer, a medical examiner's assistant, later Chief Medical Examiner on the CBS series NCIS, since the first season episode, "Split Decision". Starting from season 10, Dietzen was promoted to a regular cast member, and began appearing in the opening credits.

== Personal life ==
Dietzen married Kelly Scoby in 2004, and the couple have 2 children, a daughter, Clover, and a son, Satchel. He suffered a stroke in 2020 but recovered well from it. He also had cardiac surgery that same year.

== Filmography ==
=== Television series ===
- My Guide to Becoming a Rock Star (2002): Owen
- Boston Public (2002): David Caplan
- NCIS (recurring: seasons 1–5, also starring: seasons 6–9, main: season 10–present): Dr. Jimmy Palmer (also writer 4 episodes)
- NCIS: New Orleans (2016): Jimmy Palmer
- Perception (2013): Mark Leighton
- NCIS: Hawai'i (2022–2023): Jimmy Palmer
- NCIS: New York (2026): Jimmy Palmer

=== Films and television movies ===
- From Justin to Kelly (2003): Eddie
- Purgatory House (2004): Ghost
- Self-Inflicted (2005)
- Nowhere to Hide (2009)
- Congratulations (2012) ) (Aslo Writer)
- One-Minute Time Machine, short film (2014)
