= Diona Reasonover =

American actress

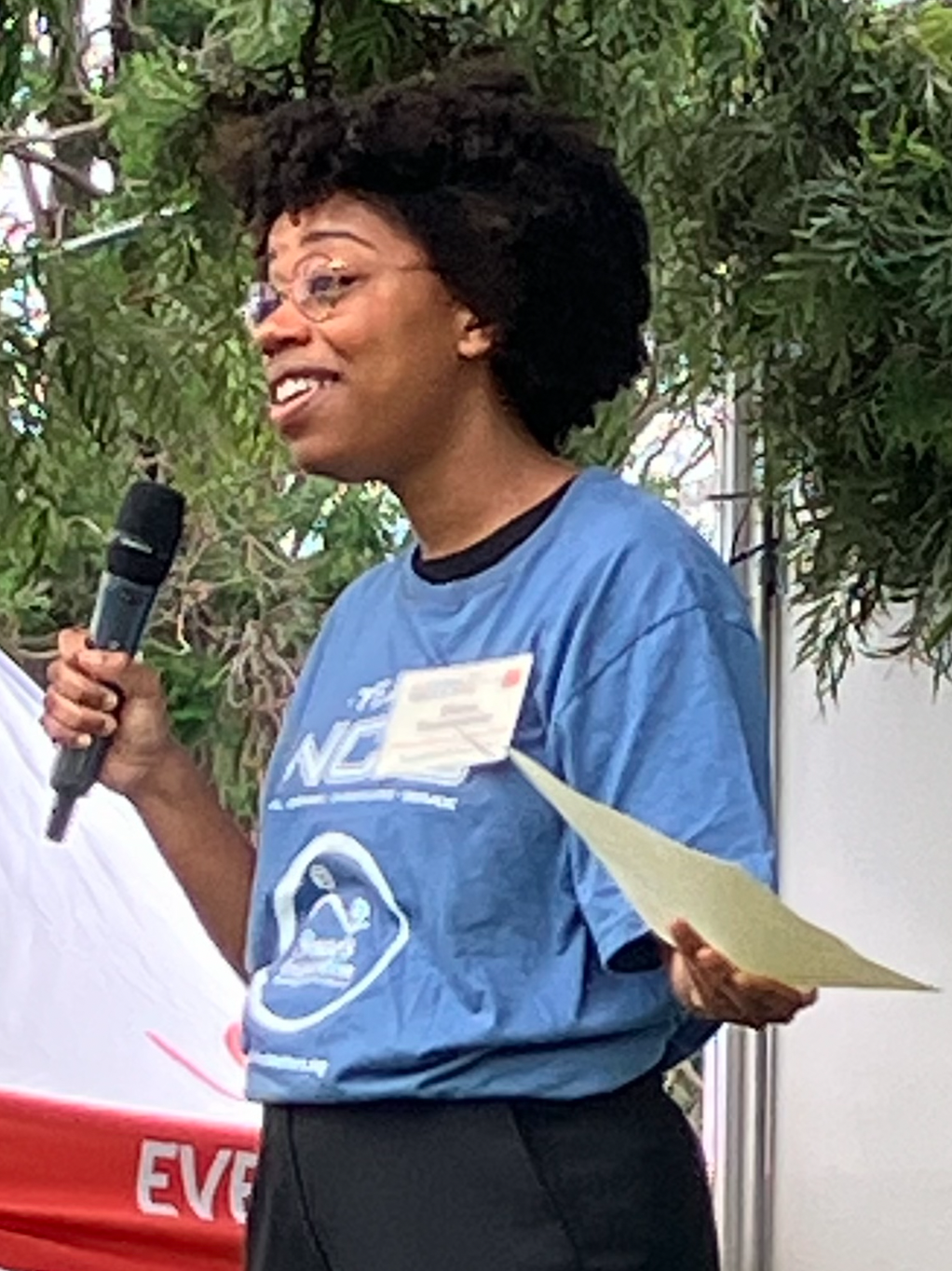
- Reasonover in 2023
- Born: January 6, 1992 (age 34); Detroit, Michigan
- Occupation: Actress
- Spouse: Patricia Villetto (m. 2018)

External image
- Photos of casting for CBS

Diona Reasonover (born January 6, 1992) is an American actress. She starred as Charmaine Eskowitz in the television show Clipped, and since 2018 has portrayed Kasie Hines in the crime drama series NCIS.

== Early life ==
Born and raised in Detroit, Michigan, Reasonover attended Renaissance High School. While in high school, she was a member of Mosaic Youth Theatre, a group of over 100 teenagers who performed in Detroit and internationally.

Reasonover attended Oberlin College and graduated with a bachelor's degree in theater and dance. She also earned a Master of Fine Arts in acting from the California Institute of the Arts. She worked as a barista while in school.

== Career ==
In 2010, Reasonover starred in HYPERBOLE: origins at [Inside] the Ford as a part of the Los Angeles-based art collective Rogue Artists Ensemble.

Reasonover acted in Lydia R. Diamond's play Stick Fly with Mo'olelo Performing Arts at San Diego's 10th Avenue Theatre in 2011. Reasonover played Cheryl, the daughter of a family's maid whose life has been dramatically changed by an all-expense-paid prep school education. Calling her performance "superb", a theater reviewer for the North County Times said she was "brainy, proud, and easily wounded, and she offers much of the show's comic relief". A reviewer for the San Diego Examiner called Reasonover "a formidable force to be reckoned with". A reviewer for The San Diego Union-Tribune called her performance "quietly fiery". Reasonover received an award at the Tenth Annual Craig Noel Awards for Theatrical Excellence.

At Upright Citizens Brigade, Reasonover is a member of improvisation group Ham Radio, which performs around Los Angeles. She is also a member of the long-form improvisation group Essence.

Reasonover starred as Charmaine Eskowitz in the television series Clipped. She patterned the character on her sister Elisa. She also did the voice of Mary-Anne in Doris & Mary-Anne Are Breaking Out of Prison. She appeared as Kasie Hines in three episodes of the CBS crime drama NCIS in a recurring role for Season 15. She was upped to a series regular for Season 16 following the departure of Pauley Perrette.

She was grand marshal of the Inclusion Matters by Shane’s Inspiration's Run, Walk & Roll 5K fundraising event in Griffith Park in September 2023.

== Personal life ==
She is openly lesbian and married Patricia Villetto in 2018.

== Filmography ==
=== Film ===
Year	Title	Role	Notes
2017	The Night Watchmen	Penny	
2017	The Clapper	Big Bang Theory Producer	Uncredited
2020	For Madmen Only: The Stories of Del Close	Annie the Summoner	

=== Television ===
Year	Title	Role	Notes
2015	Clipped	Charmaine Eskowitz	Main role
2015	Comedy Bang! Bang!	Salesgirl	Episode: "Ken Marino Wears a Slim Gray Suit and Salmon Tie"
2016	Girl Meets World	Sister Mary Beth	Episode: "Girl Meets Cory and Topanga"
2016	Superstore	Pet Owner	Episode: "Secret Shopper"
2016	2 Broke Girls	Becky	Episode: "And the No New Friends"
2017	Transparent	Improviser #2	Episode: "Groin Anomaly"
2017	Do You Want to See a Dead Body?	Julie	Episode: "A Body and Some Pants (with Michaela Watkins)"
2017, 2019	Future Man	Estelle Kronish	2 episodes
2018	Grace and Frankie	Ann Reins	Episode: "The Landline"
2018	Rob Riggle's Ski Master Academy	Head Hipster	Episode: "Cream Dream"
2018–present	NCIS	Kasie Hines	Main role; also writer
2021	No Activity	(voice)	Episode: "It's Not a Cult!"
2022	NCIS: Hawaiʻi	Kasie Hines	2 episodes
