= List of NCIS home video releases =

The following is a complete list of home media releases for the CBS television series NCIS. The first nine seasons have been released on DVD in Regions 1, 2 and 4. In Germany (Region 2), season 1–4 and 6–8 were released in two separate sets for each season. The first season DVD release omits the introductory episodes that aired as part of the eighth season of JAG. The JAG Season 8 DVD set was released in Region 1 on March 17, 2009, in Region 2 on June 21, 2010, and Region 4 on August 5, 2010. All releases are distributed by Paramount Home Entertainment through CBS Home Entertainment.

== Full Seasons ==
Title	Set details	DVD release dates			Special features
Title	Set details	Region 1	Region 2	Region 4	Special features
NCIS: Naval Criminal Investigative Service: The Complete First Season	Discs: 6; Episodes: 23	June 6, 2006	July 24, 2006	August 10, 2006	Region 1 only: Commentary on "Yankee White" by Co-Creator/Executive Producer/Writer/Director Donald P. Bellisario; N.C.I.S.: Creating Season 1; N.C.I.S.: Building the Team; N.C.I.S.: Defining the Look
NCIS: Naval Criminal Investigative Service: The Complete Second Season	Discs: 6; Episodes: 23	November 14, 2006	October 16, 2006	October 12, 2006	Region 1 only: Investigating Season 2; The Real N.C.I.S.; What's New in Season 2; The Lab Tour with Pauley Perrette; Audio Commentaries on Select Episodes; "The Bone Yard" by Chas. Floyd Johnson; "Twilight" by Pauley Perrette, John C. Kelley and Michael Weatherly
NCIS: Naval Criminal Investigative Service: The Third Season	Discs: 6; Episodes: 24	April 24, 2007	June 18, 2007	March 15, 2007	Region 1 and 2 only: The Real N.C.I.S. Declassified; Hit the Head Montage; The Women of N.C.I.S.; N.C.I.S.: Season of Change; The Round Table; Audio Commentaries on Select Episodes (Region 1 only); "Kill Ari (Part I)" by Donald P. Bellisario; "Frame Up" by Pauley Perrette & Michael Weatherly; "Boxed In" by Avery Drewe & David Bellisario; "Bloodbath" by Pauley Perrette & Michael Weatherly
NCIS: Naval Criminal Investigative Service: The Fourth Season	Discs: 6; Episodes: 24	October 23, 2007	May 19, 2008	July 10, 2008	Cast and Crew Commentaries on Select Episodes (Region 1 only); "Twisted Sister" with Sean Murray & Terrence O'Hara; "Dead Man Walking" with Sean Murray & Cote de Pablo; "Skeletons" with Brian Dietzen & David McCallum; "Grace Period" with Michael Weatherly; "Cover Story" with Michael Weatherly & Pauley Perrette; "Angel of Death" with Don Bellisario; Cast Round Table (Parts 1&2); Ducky's World; Behind the Set: The Production Design of N.C.I.S.; Dressed to Kill: Dressing the Sets of N.C.I.S.; Prop Master; Picture Perfect: The Look of N.C.I.S.; Season of Secrets
NCIS: Naval Criminal Investigative Service: The Fifth Season	Discs: 5; Episodes: 19	August 26, 2008	July 22, 2009	May 7, 2009	Cast and Crew Commentaries on Selected Episodes (Region 1 only); "Bury Your Dead" with actor Michael Weatherly and Patricia H. O'Hara; "Requiem" with actor Mark Harmon & co-executive producer Shane Brennan; "Dog Tags" with actors David McCallum & Brian Dietzen; "Recoil" with actor Cote de Pablo and director James Whitmore, Jr.; Requiem Revisited; N.C.I.S. Season 5: Stem to Stern; The Dressing Room: The Costume and Wardrobe of N.C.I.S.; N.C.I.S. on Location; From Pauley to Abby: Hairspray, Lipstick and Tattoos
NCIS: Naval Criminal Investigative Service: The Sixth Season	Discs: 6; Episodes: 25	August 25, 2009	July 19, 2010	June 3, 2010	Cast and Crew Commentaries on Selected Episodes (Region 1 only); "Broken Bird" with David McCallum & James Whitmore, Jr.; "Bounce" with Michael Weatherly; "Toxic" with Pauley Perrette & Sean Murray; "Bodies of Work" – Actor Brian Dietzen gives a tour of WM Creations, The company that created the "Bodies" used on NCIS; "Fear: A DVD Exclusive" – An acoustic version of Pauley Perrette's song "Fear"; "Starting with a Bang" – A look at the season's opening arc; "Horsin' Around" – Featurette based on "South by Southwest" episode; "Season Six: Cruising Along" – Cast and crew reflect on some of the major events of the season; "Six Degrees of Conversation" – The cast and crew talks about season six
NCIS: Naval Criminal Investigative Service: The Seventh Season	Discs: 6; Episodes: 24	August 24, 2010	June 13, 2011	July 7, 2011	NCIS: A Sound Investment; Lucky Number Seven; Home Sweet Home: Creating the Gibbs House; The Future Is Now: NCIS Meets the Jet Pack; Gimme Two Steps: Staging the Bar Fight; Celebrating Episode 150; Personnel Effects; Cast Roundtable; Cast & Crew Commentaries on Selected Episodes (Region 1 only); "Faith" with Mark Harmon, Arvin Brown and Gary Glasberg; "Flesh and Blood" with Michael Weatherly and Robert Wagner
NCIS: Naval Criminal Investigative Service: The Eighth Season	Discs: 6; Episodes: 24	August 23, 2011	July 30, 2012	September 1, 2011	"I Have a Question For..." – Questions from the Fans; Technically Speaking – A conversation with Technical advisor Leon Carroll, Jr.; Practical Magic: Turning Back Time on Director Vance; Lights! Camera! Weatherly! – Michael Weatherly directs an episode; Grab Your Gear: A Look at Season 8; Very Special Effects; Murder, They Wrote – The Writers talk about NCIS; Cast & Crew Commentaries on Selected Episodes; "Cracked" by Pauley Perrette and Tony Wharmby; "Enemies Domestic" by Rocky Carroll, Jesse Stern and Mark Horowitz; "A Man Walks Into a Bar..." by Mark Harmon, Gary Glasberg and James Whitmore, Jr.; "One Last Score" by Michael Weatherly and Mark Horowitz
NCIS: Naval Criminal Investigative Service: The Ninth Season	Discs: 6; Episodes: 24	August 21, 2012	August 12, 2013	August 1, 2012	Nine Is Fine; The Finish Line; Casting Off; Episode Two Hundred; NCIS Season 9 Cast Roundtable; Psyched Up: Jamie Lee Curtis on Set; Audio Commentaries on Select Episodes; "Housekeeping" with Michael Weatherly and Cote de Pablo; "Life Before His Eyes" with Mark Harmon, Gary Glasberg and Tony Wharmby; "Rekindled" with Michael Weatherly and Mark Horowitz; "Up in Smoke" with Brian Dietzen, Matt Jones and Steven D. Binder; Deleted Scene (Region 1 and 2 only)
NCIS: Naval Criminal Investigative Service: The Tenth Season	Discs: 6; Episodes: 24	August 20, 2013	August 18, 2014	August 21, 2013	Mr. Carroll Goes to Washington: An Interview with NCIS Director Mark D. Clookie; A Death in the Family; DiNozzo's Digs; You Wear It Well; 10 Items or Less: 10 Random Looks at NCIS; X Marks The Spot: A Look at Season X; 10 Years Aft; Inside NCIS; Audio Commentaries on Select Episodes; "Extreme Prejudice" with Gary Glasberg and Tony Wharmby; "Seek" with Michael Weatherly and Scott Williams; "Hit And Run" with Pauley Perrette and Gina Monreal; "Detour" with David McCallum and Brian Dietzen; Deleted Scenes
NCIS: Naval Criminal Investigative Service: The Eleventh Season	Discs: 6; Episodes: 24	August 19, 2014	December 15, 2014	August 16, 2014	Celebrating 250; NCIS in New Orleans; Game change; Remembering Jackson Gibbs: A tribute to Ralph Waite; On the record; Finding Ellie Bishop; In the stills of the night; Background check; Joe Spand: Fornell for real; Audio Commentaries on Select Episodes; "Past, Present, And Future" with Michael Weatherly, James Whitmore Jr., Scott Williams and Gina Lucita Monreal; "Crescent City" with Mark Harmon and Gary Glasberg; "Shooter" with Pauley Perrette, Sean Murray and Frank Cardea
NCIS: Naval Criminal Investigative Service: The Twelfth Season	Discs: 6; Episodes: 24	August 18, 2015	December 7, 2015 - Europe / October 24, 2016 - UK	August 26, 2015	Pre-Flight Jitters: Shooting on Location; Bad to the bone; Rocky Carroll: Director; Inside Season 12; Table for Ten; #1 Drama in the world; Deleted/Extended scenes; Audio Commentaries on Select episodes; "House Rules" with Sean Murray, Terrence O'Hara and Christopher J. Walid; "We Build, We Fight" with Rocky Carroll, Jennifer Corbett and Mark Horowitz; "Cabin Fever" with Mark Harmon, Bethany Roonet and Joe Spano
NCIS: Naval Criminal Investigative Service: The Thirteenth Season	Discs: 6; Episodes: 24	August 23, 2016	Europe - 12 January 2017 / UK - 4 December 2017	September 29, 2016	Audio Commentaries on Select Episodes; "Viral" with Rocky Carroll, Sean Murray and Emily Wickersham; "16 Years" with David McCallum, Mark Horowitz and Brendan Fehily; "Sister City" (Part I) with Christopher Walid and Christopher Silber; "Sister City, Part II" with Christopher Silber and Christopher Walid; "Reasonable Doubts" with Michael Weatherly, Robert Wagner, Frank Cardea and George Schenck; Deleted Scenes; "Sister City, Part II" (NCIS: New Orleans Crossover Episode); Crossing Over: A Look at "Sister City"; Boom; Celebrating 300; Heroes' Song; Inside Season 13; The Definitive DiNozzo; All's Fair in Love and War; The Agency Turns 50
NCIS: Naval Criminal Investigative Service: The Fourteenth Season	Discs: 6; Episodes: 24	August 29, 2017	Europe - 1 February 2018 / UK - October 15, 2018	August 30, 2017	Audio Commentaries on Select Episodes; "Off the Grid" with Rocky Carroll, George Schenck and Frank Cardea; "Pandora's Box" with Christopher Silber and Christopher Waild; "Pandora's Box, Part II" with Christopher Silber and Christopher Waild; "One Book, Two Covers" with Wilmer Valderrama, Terrence O'Hara and David North; Table Read "Nonstop"; Opening Pandora's Box; Above Board: A Look at Season 14; Joining the Family: The New Agents; Pandora's Box, Part II (NCIS: New Orleans Crossover Episode); Tribute to Gary Glasberg; Brian Dietzen's NCIS
NCIS: Naval Criminal Investigative Service: The Fifteenth Season	Discs: 6; Episodes: 24	August 21, 2018	February 14, 2019	August 15, 2018	Audio Commentaries on Select Episodes; "Keep Your Friends Close" with Mark Harmon, Joe Spano, Gina Lucita Monreal and Mark Horowitz; "Death from Above" with Rocky Carroll and Christopher J. Waild; Make It Rain; Friends and Enemies; A Conversation With Mark Harmon and Joe Spano; NCIS: Inside Season 15; Hello Jack Sloane: Maria Bello Joins the Cast; David McCallum Answers the Proust Questionnaire; NCIS at 15: Special Effects; Visual Effects; Stunts; Through the Camera Lens
NCIS: Naval Criminal Investigative Service: The Sixteenth Season	Discs: 6; Episodes: 24	September 3, 2019	February 6, 2020	August 28, 2019	Audio Commentaries on Select Episodes; "Once Upon a Tim" with Steven D. Binder and David J. North; "Bears and Cubs" with Scott Williams and Christopher J. Waild; "Mona Lisa" with Brendan Fehily and David J. North; "Hail & Farewell" with Jennifer Corbett and Michael Zinberg; Best Kept Secrets; NCIS Season 16: Rules of Engagement; Welcome to the Team, Kasie Hines; NCIS Season 16: The Conversation; Pilot Episode of Star Trek: Discovery; Pilot Episode of Magnum P.I.
NCIS: Naval Criminal Investigative Service: The Seventeenth Season	Discs: 5; Episodes: 20	July 28, 2020	March 4, 2021	August 12, 2020	Other Times. Other Lives.; Hallowed Ground: The Arizona; Inside Season 17; The Return of Ziva David
NCIS: Naval Criminal Investigative Service: The Eighteenth Season	Discs: 5; Episodes: 16	August 17, 2021	March 24, 2022	September 1, 2021	Until We Meet Again; 400: A League of Its Own; Season 18: A Year to Remember; Grab Your Gear and Wash Your Hands; Audio and Video Commentary
NCIS: Naval Criminal Investigative Service: The Nineteenth Season	Discs: 5; Episodes: 21	August 16, 2022	February 9, 2023		NCIS on Location in Alaska; Brian Dietzen and Scott Williams on The Helpers.; Torres and Tennant; Gary Cole and Katrina Law Join NCIS; Being Gibbs; Cast of Characters; T.N.T. (NCIS: Hawai'i Episode) - Part 2 of Crossover
NCIS: Naval Criminal Investigative Service: The Twentieth Season	Discs: 6; Episodes: 22	August 22, 2023			NCIS: Hawai'i Crossover Episodes Prisoners Dilemma and Deep Fake.; NCIS: Los Angeles Crossover Episode A Long Time Coming; A Killer Crossover; Audio Commentaries on Select Episodes; Unforgettable: NCIS Season 20; 20 Years at the Top; 20 Years of Location; 20 Years of Visual Effects; 20 Years of Cinematography
NCIS: Naval Criminal Investigative Service: The Twenty-First Season	Discs: 3; Episodes: 10	August 13, 2024			Farewell, Ducky: Celebrating David McCallum; Ruah's Rules: Directing NCIS and NCIS: Hawai'i; Audio Commentary on Select Episode; 21 Seasons and Counting: An Inside Look at NCIS Season 21; NCIS In Action: Behind the Stunts
NCIS: Naval Criminal Investigative Service: The Twenty-Second Season	Discs: 5; Episodes: 20	September 9, 2025			
NCIS: Naval Criminal Investigative Service: The Twenty-Third Season	Discs: 5; Episodes: 20	September 22, 2026	December 7, 2026		

== Compilations ==
Title	Set details	DVD release dates			Special features
Title	Set details	Region 1	Region 2	Region 4	Special features
NCIS: Naval Criminal Investigative Service: Seasons 1–3	Discs: 18; Episodes: 70	April 24, 2007	—N/a	—N/a	Includes all special features from seasons 1–3
NCIS: Naval Criminal Investigative Service: Seasons 1–4	Discs: 24; Episodes: 94	October 23, 2007	—N/a	—N/a	Includes all special features from seasons 1–4
NCIS: Naval Criminal Investigative Service: Seasons 1–5	Discs: 29; Episodes: 113	August 26, 2008	—N/a	March 4, 2010 Re-Release: November 13, 2019	Includes all special features from seasons 1–5 (region 1); Includes special features from seasons 4–5, does not include special features from seasons 1–3 or commentaries from season 4–5 (region 4)
NCIS: Naval Criminal Investigative Service: Seasons 1–6	Discs: 35; Episodes: 138	August 25, 2009	July 19, 2010	—N/a	Includes all special features from seasons 1–6 (region 1); Includes special features from seasons 4–6, does not include special features from seasons 1–2 or commentaries from seasons 3–6 (region 2)
NCIS: Naval Criminal Investigative Service: Seasons 1–7	Discs: 41; Episodes: 162	August 24, 2010	—N/a	—N/a	Includes all special features from seasons 1–7
NCIS: Naval Criminal Investigative Service: Seasons 1–8	Discs: 47; Episodes: 186	August 23, 2011	July 30, 2012	—N/a	Includes all special features from seasons 1–8 (region 1); Includes special features from seasons 4–8, does not include special features from seasons 1–2 or commentaries from seasons 3–7 (region 2)
NCIS: Naval Criminal Investigative Service: Seasons 1–9	Discs: 53; Episodes: 210	August 21, 2012	—N/a	November 7, 2012	Includes all special features from seasons 1–9 (region 1); Includes special features from seasons 4–9, does not include special features from seasons 1–3, commentaries from season 4–7 or deleted scene from season 9 (region 4)
NCIS: Naval Criminal Investigative Service: Seasons 1–10	Discs: 59; Episodes: 234	August 20, 2013	—N/a	August 21, 2013	Includes all special features from seasons 1–10 (region 1); Includes special features from seasons 4–10, does not include special features from seasons 1–3, commentaries from season 4–7 or deleted scene from season 9
NCIS: Naval Criminal Investigative Service: Seasons 1–11	Discs: 65; Episodes: 258	August 19, 2014	—N/a	—N/a	TBA
NCIS: Naval Criminal Investigative Service: Seasons 1–12	Discs: 71; Episodes: 282	August 18, 2015	—N/a	August 19, 2015	Includes all special features from seasons 1–12 (region 4)
NCIS: Naval Criminal Investigative Service: Seasons 1–13	Discs: 78; Episodes: 306; Run Time: 18,360 Minutes (Excludes special features)	—N/a	UK: December 4, 2017/Europe: TBC	—N/a	Includes all special features from seasons 1-13 (region 2)
NCIS: The Best of Abby	Discs: 3; Episodes: 12	July 21, 2015	—N/a	—N/a	Includes 12 fan chosen episodes from the first 11 seasons, featuring Abby, with special introductions by Pauley Perrette (region 1)
NCIS: Naval Criminal Investigative Service: Seasons 6–10	Discs: 30; Episodes: 121	N/A	N/A	November 13, 2019	Same features as individual releases.
NCIS: Naval Criminal Investigative Service: Seasons 11–15	Discs: 29; Episodes: 120	N/A	N/A	November 13, 2019	Same features as individual releases.
