= NCIS season 4 =

Season of television series

NCIS
- Season 4
- Season 4 U.S. DVD cover
- Starring: Mark Harmon; Michael Weatherly; Cote de Pablo; Pauley Perrette; Sean Murray; Lauren Holly; David McCallum
- No. of episodes: 24

Release
- Original network: CBS
- Original release: September 19, 2006 – May 22, 2007

Season chronology
- ← Previous; Season 3 Next → Season 5

The fourth season of the police procedural drama NCIS was originally broadcast between September 19, 2006, and May 22, 2007. Special Agent Leroy Jethro Gibbs left NCIS at the end of season three after a terrorist attack had been successful because his superiors did not heed his warnings in time. The team is now led by Anthony DiNozzo for a short time until Gibbs' eventual return. New characters introduced in this season are Michelle Lee, who was briefly on DiNozzo's team and was transferred to the legal department upon Gibbs' return, and (already in the final episodes of season 3) Gibbs' former boss and mentor Mike Franks, both as recurring characters. Also, albeit later in the season, Army CID Lieutenant Colonel Hollis Mann is introduced as another love interest for Gibbs.

In December 2006, Bill Keveney from USA Today announced that the "CBS investigative drama NCIS topped the Nielsen viewership list for the first time with 17.4 million. CBS was the No. 1 network in viewers and young adults (ages 18 to 49) for the week of Dec. 11–17."

TV Guide reported on May 5, 2007, that creator and showrunner Donald Bellisario would step down and leave the series due to a disagreement with series star Mark Harmon. Because of Bellisario's "chaotic management style", Harmon threatened to leave NCIS. Co-executive producer Chas. Floyd Johnson and head writer Shane Brennan replaced Bellisario as showrunner.

== Cast and characters ==
=== Main ===
- Mark Harmon as Leroy Jethro Gibbs, NCIS Supervisory Special Agent (SSA) of the Major Case Response Team (MCRT) assigned to Washington's Navy Yard
- Michael Weatherly as Anthony DiNozzo, NCIS Senior Special Agent, Second in Command of MCRT
- Cote de Pablo as Ziva David, Mossad Liaison Officer to NCIS
- Pauley Perrette as Abby Sciuto, Forensic Specialist for NCIS
- Sean Murray as Timothy McGee, NCIS Junior Special Agent
- Lauren Holly as Jenny Shepard, NCIS Director
- David McCallum as Dr. Donald "Ducky" Mallard, Chief Medical Examiner for NCIS

=== Recurring ===
- Joe Spano as Tobias Fornell, FBI Senior Special Agent
- Jessica Steen as Paula Cassidy, NCIS Senior Special Agent
- Brian Dietzen as Jimmy Palmer, Assistant Medical Examiner for NCIS
- Troian Bellisario as Sarah McGee, Tim McGee's sister
- Mary Mouser as Kelly Gibbs, Gibbs' deceased daughter
- Stephanie Mello as Cynthia Summer, NCIS Secretary to Director Shepard
- Muse Watson as Mike Franks, retired Senior Special Agent for NCIS and Gibbs' former boss
- Don Franklin as Ron Sacks, FBI Special Agent
- Scottie Thompson as Jeanne Benoit, Tony's girlfriend while undercover
- Armand Assante as René Benoit, NCIS target
- Susanna Thompson as Hollis Mann, Gibbs' girlfriend and Army CID Special Agent
- Liza Lapira as Michelle Lee, NCIS Special Agent
- David Dayan Fisher as Trent Kort, CIA Agent
- Sandra Hess as Regine Smidt, associate of René Benoit
- Corey Stoll as Martin Quinn, associate of René Benoit
- Enzo Cilenti as Mamoun Sharif, NCIS target
- Payton Spencer as Emily Fornell, Tobias Fornell's daughter

== Episodes ==
No. overall	No. in season	Title	Directed by	Written by	Original release date	Prod. code	U.S. viewers (millions)
71	1	"Shalom"	William Webb	Teleplay by : John C. Kelley; Story by : Donald P. Bellisario & John C. Kelley	September 19, 2006	401	13.48
After witnessing a Mossad agent perform an assassination, which was not authorized by Mossad, Ziva is suspected by the FBI to be a double agent. Now a fugitive and on the run, Ziva is forced to ask for help from Gibbs, who is in Mexico after retiring from NCIS. Tony finds his leadership skills being tested to the limit as he and the rest of the team put their careers on the line, determined to prove her innocence before the FBI can arrest her.
72	2	"Escaped"	Dennis Smith	Teleplay by : Steven D. Binder; Story by : Christopher Silber & Steven D. Binder	September 26, 2006	402	14.12
A former petty officer, convicted of murder, escapes from prison and forces F.B.I. Special Agent Fornell to reopen his case in order to find the real culprit whilst claiming his own innocence. Fornell asks Gibbs, who had worked on the case before and is reinstated as an NCIS agent by Director Shepard, for help when his daughter is threatened. To his former team's disappointment, Gibbs insists that the reinstatement is only temporary. The team soon finds discrepancies in the petty officer's case and that he may have been framed.
73	3	"Singled Out"	Terrence O'Hara	David J. North	October 3, 2006	403	15.89
Gibbs returns to NCIS and leads his team to investigate the kidnapping of a Navy Lieutenant, who is a computer specialist. They discover that the Lieutenant had used her military knowledge to profile potential husbands and was attending speed dating events. When they suspect that the kidnapper may continue attending the event in order to avoid suspicion, Ziva goes undercover at a speed-dating event to identify him. In addition, Tony is offered a promotion – and his own team – as a reward for his performance as team leader while Gibbs was retired but declines and remains in Gibbs' team.
74	4	"Faking It"	Thomas J. Wright	Shane Brennan	October 10, 2006	404	15.86
Minutes after Metro Police traffic cops apprehend a man with a recently-fired gun, a car crashes behind them with a dead Petty Officer in the driver's seat and "NCIS" written in his blood on the seat, leading the team to suspect the arrested man had shot the Petty Officer. Tony and Gibbs find out that the Petty Officer went undercover in an operation led by Gibbs' former mentor Mike Franks, who informs them that their suspect is a Russian terrorist involved in selling illegal weapons to Chechen rebels and other extremist terrorist groups but the case went cold when the CIA took over and the files "went missing" from the NCIS evidence storeroom. The situation takes a delicate turn when Homeland Security claims the suspect is actually working for them.
75	5	"Dead and Unburied"	Colin Bucksey	Nell Scovell	October 17, 2006	405	15.92
When a missing lance corporal is found dead in a vacant house by a real-estate broker giving two potential buyers a tour, the NCIS team discovers that he was buried in the backyard and then exhumed. They also learn about his identity and that he was to be deployed to Iraq, but he never showed up for duty. The investigation leads them to a new clue – he had two fiancées who are aghast at learning that they were both engaged to the same man. Abby runs the DNA samples from the two women to find out if the DNA is a match to the soil found on the dead man's body and later finds out that the team are looking for a third woman who might have been sleeping with the victim.
76	6	"Witch Hunt"	James Whitmore Jr.	Steven Kriozere	October 31, 2006	407	15.94
It is Halloween, and the NCIS team is busy investigating a ransom case in which a Marine's daughter has been kidnapped after the kidnapper attacked the Marine in his home. The investigation leads them to a fact that the couple has been separated. They decide to focus on the wife's ex-boyfriend, after learning that the woman is the one who destroyed their marriage. Meanwhile, McGee and Tony are stunned by Abby's Halloween costume.
77	7	"Sandblast"	Dennis Smith	Robert Palm	November 7, 2006	406	15.44
When a Marine colonel dies in an explosion at a military golf course, the NCIS team must investigate a suspected terrorist attack with the help from the Army Criminal Investigative Division (CID). The CIA gives them a lead to an abandoned warehouse. However, things take a sinister turn when both NCIS and Army CID invade and discover that it is actually a trap – the warehouse is rigged with a bomb set to go off any second. Ziva goes against Gibbs' orders and is successful in defusing the bomb, preserving any evidence for both groups to use, but earns a brief reprimand from Gibbs for doing so. In the meantime, McGee uses his computer skills to break into the secret government files to uncover the terrorist cell while Tony embarks on a personal quest of his own as he attempts to stop the Marine colonel's son from dropping out of college and enlisting in hopes of avenging his father's death.
78	8	"Once a Hero"	Thomas J. Wright	Shane Brennan	November 14, 2006	408	15.80
A decorated Marine veteran falls from a high floor into the atrium of a hotel during a conference of agency directors (including Jenny Shepard) while Tony and Ziva are on security detail. The NCIS team must find out what happened to him. Soon they realize that the Marine did not commit suicide and that he was homeless, having lost everything after being injured while serving in Iraq. Having gone through the victim's personal belongings, the team soon find compromising evidence against him but Gibbs is determined to prove the man's innocence by any means necessary.
79	9	"Twisted Sister"	Terrence O'Hara	Steven D. Binder	November 21, 2006	409	17.00
When McGee's younger sister Sarah shows up disoriented and bloodied at his door in the middle of the night, and claims that she may have killed someone, McGee takes matters into his own hands, beginning his own independent investigation. Sarah claims that she is innocent, but has no memory of the past several hours and refuses to go with McGee to NCIS. While McGee works on figuring out what happened to his sister, the NCIS team is investigating a case of a Navy sailor, who is somehow connected to McGee's sister. Both Tony and Abby are busy with love problems, while McGee turns out to have another secret.
80	10	"Smoked"	Dennis Smith	John C. Kelley & Robert Palm	November 28, 2006	410	17.96
A dead man in a chimney chute on a Marine base leads the team to discover a serial killer's burial ground. They believe that the dead man was the serial killer until Abby uncovers something which proves he might actually be a victim while the whole team are in for a shock when the true killer is finally revealed. Meanwhile, Tony helps the director with a special project and makes time for his girlfriend as well while Ducky talks to Gibbs about how he felt betrayed when Gibbs left and after a heart-to-heart the two eventually repair their friendship, and McGee deals with the team's reaction to their portrayal in his best-selling book 'Deep Six'.
81	11	"Driven"	Dennis Smith	Teleplay by : Richard C. Arthur & Nell Scovell & John C. Kelley; Story by : Richard C. Arthur	December 12, 2006	411	17.39
The team is forced to attend a sexual harassment seminar but much to their relief, Gibbs receives a call that a beautiful Navy officer is found dead in a classified self-driven robotic vehicle she was working on developing for a potential DoD contractor. Although it initially looks like suicide, when Abby puts the vehicle through some tests, it nearly takes her life as well but thanks to Gibbs' efforts, she is saved from certain death although McGee is left guilt-ridden over what happened. They discover that someone rigged the vehicle to kill the passenger and make it appear to be suicide but the woman who was killed was not the intended target. While Gibbs is questioning the scientists involved in the contract, the vehicle "escapes" from the garage and it is up to Abby and McGee to stop it from killing more people. Meanwhile, Tony visits the hospital to see his girlfriend and continues working on special projects for the Director. Ziva notices Tony getting calls from the hospital and begins worrying about his health.
82	12	"Suspicion"	Colin Bucksey	Shane Brennan	January 16, 2007	412	15.95
When a Marine is murdered in a small town hotel room, NCIS is called in to investigate. However, things take a nosedive when they learn that the local Sheriff's department already cleaned up the crime scene and performed an autopsy. They also have a suspect – an Iraqi national who just moved to the town a few months earlier. But NCIS later receive evidence suggesting that an active terrorist cell might be in play in the town, and the national is not quite the man they believe he is.
83	13	"Sharif Returns"	Terrence O'Hara	Steven D. Binder	January 23, 2007	413	14.83
When the NCIS team learns that the missing 10 kilograms of highly toxic chemical weapons are now in the hands of Mamoun Sharif (Enzo Cilenti), the wanted terrorist from "Sandblast", they will have to find a way to find the man and stop him before it is too late with the aid from Army Lt. Col. Hollis Mann and constant phone calls from Sharif himself, who claims to have infected Gibbs with the chemical.
84	14	"Blowback"	Thomas J. Wright	Teleplay by : Christopher Silber & David J. North & Shane Brennan; Story by : Christopher Silber	February 6, 2007	414	16.16
After catching an international arms dealer thanks to a Mossad tip, the NCIS team learns that the Navy's highly classified weapons system will be sold to "La Grenouille," an important arms dealer. To stop the transaction from happening, the team sends Ducky undercover. Meanwhile, another government agency appears to be working on the same case, with different plans. Also Gibbs discovers DiNozzo's undercover Op.
85	15	"Friends & Lovers"	Dennis Smith	John C. Kelley	February 13, 2007	415	15.36
A man proposing to his girlfriend finds the body of a sailor. NCIS works with local officers believing that the man died of an unintentional drug overdose. However, Abby discovers a message written in blood on a laminated card found at the crime scene and the team suspect that the sailor might not have been a victim after all. Meanwhile, Jimmy continues his relationship with Agent Michelle Lee and Tony helps Jeanne deal with an obsessive ex-boyfriend as well as a Metro cop dealing with his own ex.
86	16	"Dead Man Walking"	Colin Bucksey	Nell Scovell	February 20, 2007	416	15.41
A Navy Lieutenant arrives at NCIS with radiation poisoning requesting that the team investigate his murder, prompting them to investigate who is responsible for poisoning him. The Navy Lieutenant is an inspector for the International Atomic Energy Agency, so the team tries to figure out who would want to make sure he didn't make it to the next inspection. However, only his two closest colleagues knew where the next inspection was to take place. Meanwhile, Ziva sympathizes with the Lieutenant, in whom she sees a reflection of her own most strongly held beliefs and develops feelings for him. It is revealed in the next episode that the Lieutenant had died.
87	17	"Skeletons"	James Whitmore Jr.	Jesse Stern	February 27, 2007	417	16.16
An explosion at a military cemetery mausoleum turns up a skeleton. As they investigate, Ducky discovers that they have turned up the skeleton of more than one body. The team talks to the families to try to find some link between the victims. Meanwhile, Abby is having personal problems.
88	18	"Iceman"	Thomas J. Wright	Shane Brennan	March 20, 2007	418	15.69
When the man on Ducky's table turns out to still be alive the unit must track the young Marine's actions prior to his arrival in the morgue. They discover that the Marine had been on leave and used his time off for a secret trip to Baghdad. The case takes a turn when Mike Franks – Gibbs' old boss shows up revealing that the young Marine is in fact his long-lost son.
89	19	"Grace Period"	James Whitmore Jr.	John C. Kelley	April 3, 2007	419	13.79
An NCIS team, led by Paula Cassidy, discovers a tip about terrorist activity but it turns out to be a trap, resulting in the death of two agents and Cassidy, grief-stricken, begins blaming herself for what happened. Gibbs and his team are sent to investigate the deaths with Cassidy joining them during the investigation. But the team are shocked when Ducky reveals that the man who was the suicide bomber that killed Cassidy's team was dead at least a day before his bomb went off.
90	20	"Cover Story"	Dennis Smith	David J. North	April 10, 2007	420	14.38
During the murder investigation of a Petty Officer, McGee is unsettled when elements of the crime scene resemble the descriptions in his new novel, which is half-finished. The only person who had access to McGee's book, other than McGee himself, is his publisher. The killer promises two more kills and when the second body is found, McGee is pressured to determine who the killer plans to kill next.
91	21	"Brothers in Arms"	Martha Mitchell	Steven D. Binder	April 24, 2007	421	14.17
Director Shepard meets an informant named Troy Webster who has information on international arms dealer La Grenouille but Webster is killed during a gunfight, prompting Gibbs and his team to take charge of the investigation. Shepard later becomes convinced that La Grenouille, the arms dealer she has been chasing down is the one who ordered the kill but the team are all doubting her judgement, believing she might be on a personal revenge trip which is further increased when she manages to lead the team into a trap, leaving them with no clues to La Grenouille's whereabouts even after days of investigations.
92	22	"In the Dark"	Thomas J. Wright	Steven D. Binder	May 1, 2007	422	13.83
The assistant of a blind photographer notices a dead Petty Officer in one of the photographs and calls NCIS. Gibbs and his team respond to the case and use the photographer's help to re-construct the crime scene through his heightened senses of hearing and scent to find out who killed the victim. Meanwhile, both Gibbs and Tony are having love troubles.
93	23	"Trojan Horse"	Terrence O'Hara	Donald P. Bellisario & Shane Brennan	May 8, 2007	423	13.88
Part 1 of 3: A Yemeni man is found dead in a taxi headed to the NCIS headquarters but his body shows no signs of external injuries. Gibbs decides to lead the investigation into the man's death in preference to performing his duties as the Acting Director of NCIS while Jenny is in Paris attending an Interpol anti-terrorism conference. When the team discovers that the people whose names were found on a list belonging to the dead man are all dead, Gibbs suspects that the list is a decoy used to distract them. Still obsessed with her hunt for international arms-dealer, La Grenouille, Jenny gets a tip on one of the Frog's associates, Colonel General Dimitri Borov, which leads to a shocking revelation about her father, whom she believes died in 1995.
94	24	"Angel of Death"	Dennis Smith	Donald P. Bellisario	May 22, 2007	424	14.14
Part 2 of 3: Jenny returns from her European trip and discovers that she had an unannounced visitor at her home who she suspects is her supposedly dead father. All NCIS agents are scheduled to take a Homeland Security polygraph test, which Gibbs finds out to have been arranged by the CIA. Gibbs has McGee hack into the CIA to uncover who issued the polygraph, uncovering project "Lodestone" which implicates CIA involvement with La Grenouille. Jenny has Abby run fingerprints from the visitor. An unarmed Tony and Jeanne are held hostage in the hospital morgue by a drug dealer, who is desperate to extract his heroin shipment from the dead drug mule. The season ends on a cliffhanger when Jenny's visitor is identified as Colonel Jasper Shepard (her father who was believed to have committed suicide twelve years prior), and when Tony meets the man both he and Jenny have been spending months trying to arrest (René Benoit, also known as La Grenouille), who is revealed to be Jeanne's father.

== DVD special features ==
- Cast and Crew Commentaries on Select Episodes ( Region 1 only )
- Cast Roundtable (Parts 1 & 2)
- Ducky's World
- Behind the Set: The Production Design of N.C.I.S.
- Dressed to Kill: Dressing the Sets of N.C.I.S.
- Prop Master
- Picture Perfect: The Looks of N.C.I.S.
- Season of Secrets
