= Angel of Death (NCIS) =

- NCIS episode
- Episode no.: Season 4 Episode 24
- Directed by: Dennis Smith
- Written by: Donald P. Bellisario
- Original air date: May 22, 2007

Guest appearances
- Brian Dietzen as Jimmy Palmer; Scottie Thompson as Jeanne Benoit; Joe Spano as Tobias Fornell; Liza Lapira as Michelle Lee; David Dayan Fisher as Trent Kort; Armand Assante as La Grenouille; Alan Smyth as Nick Kerry; Mike Erwin as Devon Watkins; Shelly Cole as Bernadette "Bernie" Watkins; Marcy Harriell as Nurse Carly Marcano; Sandra Thigpen as Nurse Annie Hayes; Stephanie Mello as Cynthia Sumner; Roxana Brusso as Noemi Cruz

Episode chronology
← Previous "Trojan Horse"	Next → "Bury Your Dead"
- NCIS season 4

"Angel of Death " is the 24th and final episode of the fourth season of the American police procedural drama NCIS, and the 94th episode overall. It originally aired on CBS in the United States on May 22, 2007, and was seen by 14.14 million viewers. "Angel of Death" marks the departure of series creator Donald P. Bellisario, who wrote the script for the episode.

The storyline revolves around the dubious circumstances of Jasper Shepard's death, the nature of Tony's relationship with arms dealer La Grenouille's daughter, Dr. Jeanne Benoit, and the team's dismay over a mandatory polygraph test.

== Plot ==
Director Jenny Shepard returns from Europe and the NCIS team learns, to their chagrin, that they are required to take a Homeland Security polygraph test. Abby, Ziva, Lee, Palmer, McGee, and Ducky all go out for drinks to alleviate stress over the test; however, McGee and Abby are called into work and Palmer and Lee rush out, leaving Ducky and Ziva to themselves.

Discrepancies surrounding the death of Jenny's father continue to emerge, and FBI agent Fornell (Joe Spano) informs Gibbs that the CIA thinks there is a security risk in NCIS due to Jenny having gone off the radar for 21 hours. At NCIS headquarters, the director asks Abby to match fingerprints found on an empty glass and a bottle of Scotch that she found in her study, leading her to find that the prints belong to her "deceased" father.

McGee is instructed by Gibbs to hack into the CIA computers and find out where the polygraph orders originated. He finds that it came from Homeland Security originally, though the trace goes through several countries before returning to the CIA's National Clandestine Service.

Meanwhile, a distraught woman, Bernie (Shelly Cole), and her boyfriend, Nick (Alan Smyth), show up at the hospital where Jeanne (Scottie Thompson) works to see her brother Devon, who was brought in earlier. Bernie is a drug addict and her behavior elicits suspicion from Jeanne. Devon dies and is taken down to the morgue. It becomes apparent that he had been body-packing heroin and that the bags had burst, killing him.

Later that night, Tony and Jeanne realize that there is a security breach: Bernie and Nick have gone down to the morgue, intending to surgically remove the drugs. Attempting to intercept them, Jeanne and Tony are taken hostage, without weapons. Jeanne agrees to perform the procedure to retrieve the heroin and, after doing so, stabs Nick with the scalpel. This allows Tony to take Nick's gun and incapacitate him by shooting him in the shoulder. After that, Tony and Jeanne notice Bernie sniffing the heroin out of her brother's body.

At the end of the episode, Jeanne and Tony are shown leaving the hospital when a limousine pulls up. Jeanne tells Tony to get in with her, and inside Tony meets Jeanne's father, La Grenouille.

== Production ==
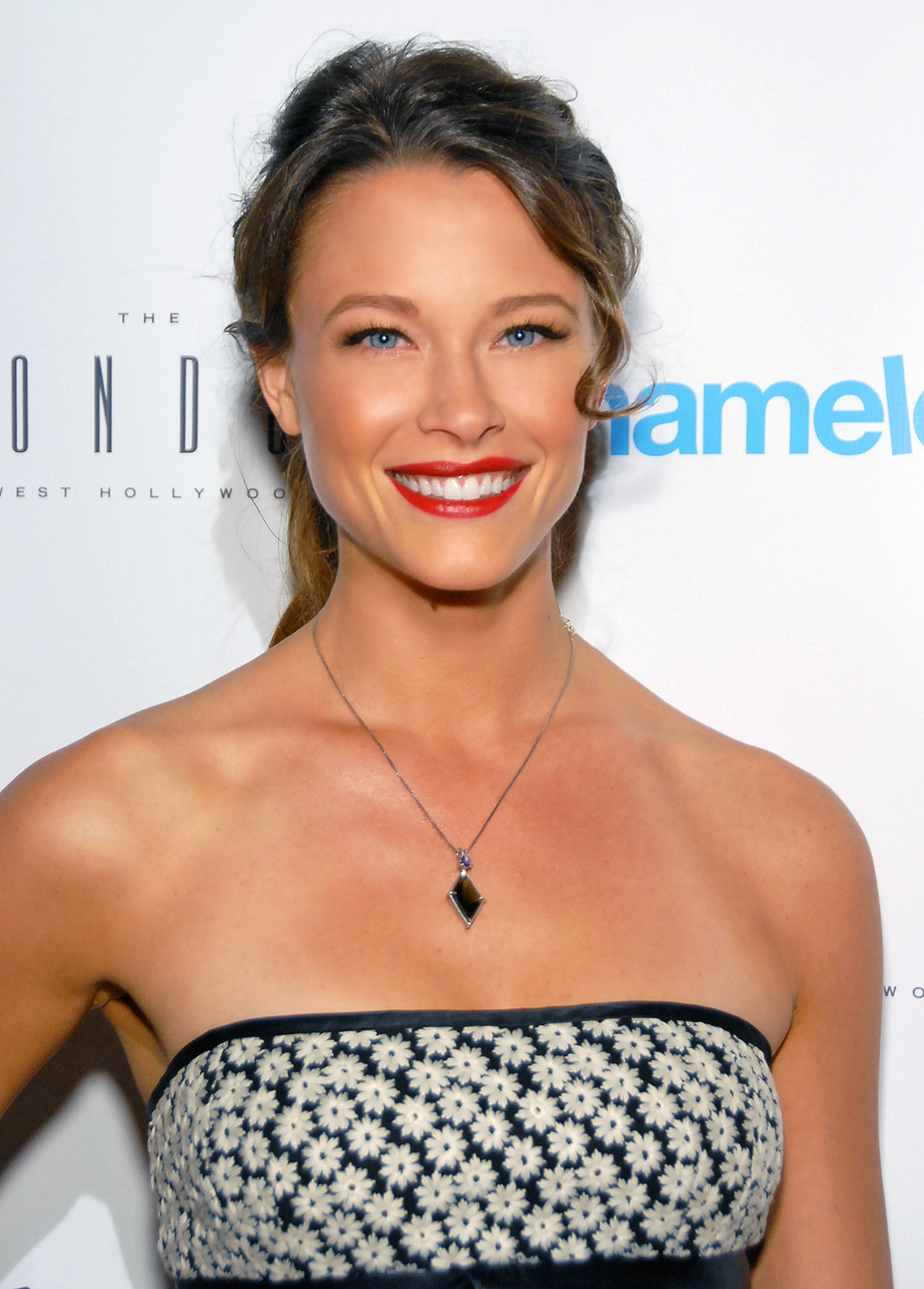
Scottie Thompson guest starred as Jeanne Benoit, Tony's girlfriend throughout the season.

"Angel of Death" is written by Donald P. Bellisario and directed by Dennis Smith. Bellisario stated that he spoke with medical personnel before writing the episode to maintain accuracy in the hospital scenes. He added that they offered differing and sometimes contradictory opinions, leading him to believe that "sometimes there is no right way."

He went on to describe various aspects that went into the filming and production. For example, during the bar scene, Pauley Perrette kept her hand over the label of her character's drink, believing that "Abby wouldn't have a light beer."

Scottie Thompson's character, Jeanne Benoit, was introduced early in the fourth season as a love interest for Tony. Tony and Jeanne's story arc was later tied into Jenny's and her vendetta against arms dealer La Grenoille when it is revealed that he is Jeanne's father. It becomes apparent at the end of this episode that Tony's relationship with her was initially an assignment given to him by Jenny and that he is using an alias. Due to these developments, Bellisario dubbed Season 4 "the season of secrets".

The La Grenouille plots were continued after "Angel of Death" before eventually culminating in the latter half of the fifth season.

== Cast "feud" and departure of Bellisario ==
In April 2007, it was reported that the lead NCIS actor, Mark Harmon, was threatening to leave the show due to series creator and executive producer Donald Bellisario's "chaotic management style". TV Guide quoted a source that explained, "Mark's been working every single day, 16 hours a day. [Don] tries to micro-manage everything. Script pages get faxed to the set at the last minute, and Mark is tired of dealing with the huge impact that makes on his life. He doesn't have time for his family or anything when he's working hours like that...Mark is one of the best-behaved actors in this industry. He's a willing, hard worker and he doesn't complain easily. For him to [threaten a walk-out] means that the situation is very bad."

Two weeks later, it was announced that Bellisario was permanently exiting the show and that co-executive producer Charles Floyd Johnson and head writer Shane Brennan would take over. Bellisario retained his status as executive producer, though he would no longer manage the show, and "Angel of Death" was the last episode he wrote. In 2008, Harmon commented, "If we're working 14-hour days now instead of the 17- or 18-hour days that we were doing, it doesn't mean we're working any less hard. We're just more organized. . . . This has become a very well-oiled machine."

Bellisario denied allegations that his management had led to "overly long production days" and said, "I asked Mark to re-shoot a scene. He redid it exactly the same way he did it the first time and never spoke to me again." Harmon responded, "I don't wish to go head to head with Bellisario in the press. . . . He knows why he left." Chicago Tribune asked Cote de Pablo (portraying Ziva), who was visiting Israel when the crew changes were announced, about the situation. She replied, "I think every single show is chaotic at some point or another. After the fourth year of a show, people are tired. That's the best way to answer that question."

It was later suggested that the development "seemed destined to hasten a creative and ratings decline" in the show. Instead, NCIS "miraculously" came back stronger and continued to attract more viewers with each season. Harmon noted, "You've got to give (Brennan and Johnson) tremendous credit for how they handled the transitional period and built more successfully than we've ever been in the past from that."

== Reception ==
"Angel of Death" drew 14.14 million viewers following its broadcast on May 22, 2007. On the CBS website, it received a 9 (out of 10) from voters.

Brett Love from AOL TV gave the episode 4 out of 7 stars, considering it to be mediocre, and wrote, "It just didn't have the feel of the big season finale. The show set a very high bar with 'Twilight' in season two and can't afford to just phone it in like this. Half of this episode could have just been dropped right in the middle of any other episode and it wouldn't have made a difference. That's fine, for episodes 2 through 23, but the big guns have to come out for the first and the last...Maybe my expectations were too high. But this is the season finale of a show that has proven in the past that it can deliver. I think high expectations are warranted. They did the work over the course of the season to get to what could have been a great season finale. Unfortunately, they only showed us a small part of it, and we'll have to wait until the fall to see the rest."

Christine Orlando later described Tony's romance with Jeanne as his "most emotionally open relationship".
