= NCIS season 6 =

Season of television series

NCIS
- Season six
- Season 6 U.S. DVD cover
- Starring: Mark Harmon; Michael Weatherly; Cote de Pablo; Pauley Perrette; Sean Murray; Rocky Carroll; David McCallum
- No. of episodes: 25

Release
- Original network: CBS
- Original release: September 23, 2008 – May 19, 2009

Season chronology
- ← Previous; Season 5 Next → NCIS Season 7 NCIS: LA Season 1

The sixth season of the police procedural drama NCIS premiered on September 23, 2008, and ended on May 19, 2009, on CBS. The new NCIS director Leon Vance (played by Rocky Carroll) became a regular cast character and Agent Gibbs's new team members were introduced: NCIS Agents Michelle Lee from Legal, Daniel Keating from Cybercrime, and Special Agent Brent Langer from the FBI. Langer is killed in the first episode of the season. After the end of the second episode, McGee, Ziva, and Tony return to the team, while Lee and Keating are transferred back to Legal and Cybercrime, respectively.

The two-part episode "Legend" introduced the team who would later go on to appear in the spin-off TV series NCIS: Los Angeles. This season currently holds the highest number of episodes (25 to be exact) in the series' history, making it the longest NCIS season.

== Cast and characters ==
=== Main ===
- Mark Harmon as Leroy Jethro Gibbs, NCIS Supervisory Special Agent (SSA) of the Major Case Response Team (MCRT) assigned to Washington's Navy Yard
- Michael Weatherly as Anthony DiNozzo, NCIS Senior Special Agent, Second in Command of MCRT
- Cote de Pablo as Ziva David, Mossad Liaison Officer to NCIS
- Pauley Perrette as Abby Sciuto, Forensic Specialist for NCIS
- Sean Murray as Timothy McGee, NCIS Junior Special Agent
- Rocky Carroll as Leon Vance, new NCIS Director
- David McCallum as Dr. Donald "Ducky" Mallard, Chief Medical Examiner for NCIS

=== Also starring ===
- Brian Dietzen as Jimmy Palmer, Assistant Medical Examiner for NCIS

=== Recurring ===
- Joe Spano as Tobias Fornell, FBI Senior Special Agent
- Muse Watson as Mike Franks, retired Senior Special Agent for NCIS and Gibbs' former boss
- Liza Lapira as Michelle Lee, NCIS Special Agent
- David Dayan Fisher as Trent Kort, CIA Agent
- Jonathan LaPaglia as Brent Langer, former member of Gibbs' team, former FBI Special Agent, and re-recruited to NCIS
- Aviva Baumann as young Shannon Gibbs, Gibbs' deceased wife
- Michael Nouri as Eli David, Ziva's father and Mossad Director
- Ralph Waite as Jackson Gibbs, Gibbs' father
- Paula Newsome as Jackie Vance, Leon Vance's wife
- Khamani Griffin as Jared Vance, Leon Vance's son
- China Anne McClain as Kayla Vance, Leon Vance's daughter
- Kent Shocknek as Guy Ross, ZNN news anchor
- Jude Ciccolella as Phillip Davenport, Secretary of the Navy
- Merik Tadros as Michael Rivkin, Mossad Agent
- Arnold Vosloo as Amit Hadar, Mossad Agent
- Omid Abtahi as Saleem Ulman, NCIS target
- Peter Jason as Robert King, Biological Weapons Specialist

=== Guest appearances ===
- Chris O'Donnell as G. Callen, NCIS Senior Special Agent attached to the Office of Special Projects in Los Angeles
- LL Cool J as Sam Hanna, NCIS Special Agent at the O.S.P.
- Louise Lombard as Lara Macy, NCIS Supervisory Special Agent at the O.S.P.
- Daniela Ruah as Kensi Blye, NCIS Special Agent at the O.S.P.
- Peter Cambor as Nate Getz, NCIS Operational Psychologist for the O.S.P.
- Barrett Foa as Eric Beale, NCIS Technical Analyst for the O.S.P.
- Jon Huertas as Sergeant Jack Kale

== Episodes ==
No. overall	No. in season	Title	Directed by	Written by	Original release date	Prod. code	U.S. viewers (millions)
114	1	"Last Man Standing"	Tony Wharmby	Shane Brennan	September 23, 2008	601	18.03
Gibbs struggles to deal with Vance's disbanding of the team while investigating a murder, only to discover that one of his newest team members may be a mole. During the case, Gibbs discovers that Ziva and McGee have been investigating different aspects of the same case all along.
115	2	"Agent Afloat"	Thomas J. Wright	Dan E. Fesman & David J. North	September 30, 2008	602	17.47
Now stationed on the aircraft carrier USS Seahawk, following a transfer from the USS Ronald Reagan, Tony finds that a Navy lieutenant has committed suicide by jumping off the boat, leaving only his uniform on deck. When McGee and Ziva go to inform the Lieutenant's wife, they find that she was beaten to death just before he went on leave. Vance tries to convince Gibbs to pick an agent to replace Tony while Tony completes his term on the Seahawk, but Gibbs continues to ask Vance why he made Tony go to sea.
116	3	"Capitol Offense"	Dennis Smith	George Schenck & Frank Cardea	October 7, 2008	603	16.29
When two cyclists find a dead woman in a river at Rock Creek Park, the team discovers that the murdered lieutenant commander was having an affair with Senator Patrick Kiley (Tim DeKay), a former Marine officer who served with Gibbs. Kiley begs Gibbs to leave him out of the investigation, knowing it would ruin his career and marriage. Back at the crime scene, the team battle against an impending storm to collect evidence before it is washed away and are perplexed by Gibbs' strange behavior. Meanwhile, Abby is furious when she discovers the cupcake Ziva gave her has been stolen and is determined to use her forensic skills to find the thief.
117	4	"Heartland"	Tony Wharmby	Jesse Stern	October 14, 2008	604	18.04
A vicious attack on several Marines leaving one dead and another in critical condition leads the team to Gibbs' hometown, where the injured Marine is from. Gibbs, Ziva, and McGee head to Gibbs' hometown, only to find that everyone in town believed their victim was dead. Ziva and McGee meet Gibbs' dad, Jackson Gibbs (Ralph Waite) and discover the estranged relationship between Gibbs and his father. After questioning the suspect, Gibbs' car is blown up along with all the evidence inside but blood DNA left behind at the scene leads to a surprising revelation. Meanwhile, Jackson tries to repair his relationship with Gibbs by showing he helped rebuild the car Gibbs wanted as a teenager and father and son finally make amends. In a flashback, it is shown that Gibbs met his future first wife, Shannon, at a train station.
118	5	"Nine Lives"	Dennis Smith	Linda Burstyn & Dan E. Fesman & David J. North	October 21, 2008	605	17.23
The team is called onto the case of a man who was stabbed to death in his garage. Tony and Gibbs go to question a retired marine, Sergeant Jack Kale, whose finger prints were found at the crime scene, but they find that the former marine is a key witness in a murder trial, and is under the protection of the FBI. McGee finds out that after the trial, Kale is going to be put in the Witness Protection Program by the FBI. Meanwhile, Ziva is frustrated when she cannot get a ticket on the flight she wants to Israel. Tony begins snooping around Ziva's desk in order to find why she is going back to Tel Aviv.
119	6	"Murder 2.0"	Arvin Brown	Steven D. Binder	October 28, 2008	606	17.26
On the week of Halloween, NCIS is assigned to investigate a series of murders by a serial killer who posts videos of the crimes on the internet. After another video is posted during a live stream from inside NCIS, a suspect is brought in but dies in Interrogation. Meanwhile, Gibbs is given a Civil Service Award but is, typically, a no-show and Tony stands in to accept the award on his behalf. Also, Ziva discovers McGee has possession of photos she ordered him to delete.
120	7	"Collateral Damage"	Terrence O'Hara	Alfonso H. Moreno	November 11, 2008	607	18.75
Gibbs and team are assigned a probie to help investigate a bank robbery at Quantico. The security guard is shot and killed in the heist but only $27,000 was stolen and all of it was burned in the getaway vehicle. After sifting through boxes of old case files, they discover several other robberies with the same modus operandi. Ducky helps restore Gibbs' faith in himself and his gut, which he lost because he thought he misjudged Agent Langer after he was framed as a mole within NCIS. Faith restored, Gibbs refocuses his suspicions on Agent Michelle Lee as the real mole, and places Langer's photo ID card up on the memorial wall of a local bar marked, "In the Line of Duty – The Fallen."
121	8	"Cloak"	James Whitmore Jr.	Jesse Stern	November 18, 2008	608	18.00
Part 1 of 2: After events in "Last Man Standing" and "Collateral Damage," Gibbs tasks Tony and Ziva to break into a top-secret facility housing project "Domino" – the U.S. military response plan for an enemy invasion of Israel. Gibbs tells them that it is a test of the facility's defenses. When they are caught halfway through the break-in, it is revealed that the facility is a hoax to trap the NCIS mole Agent Michelle Lee while accessing the Domino console, which had its keyboard laced with a radioactive trace substance. Director Vance scans everyone's hands, except Lee's. Abby's hands sets off the Geiger counter. She is taken into custody as a ploy to draw out Lee and catch her contacting her handler. After Lee marks a newspaper dispenser dead drop, she is brought into custody. Lee claims she was forced to trade secrets and kill Agent Langer (throwing off suspicion onto him as the mole) because her daughter Amanda had been kidnapped. Vance suspects her so-called "daughter" is a lie to elicit sympathy, specifically from Gibbs. But the decision is made to release Lee. Gibbs, concealed in the back of Lee's car, remarks, "Looks like we're working together."
122	9	"Dagger"	Dennis Smith	Reed Steiner & Christopher J. Waild	November 25, 2008	609	18.12
Part 2 of 2: After events in "Cloak," Agent Lee becomes a reluctant participant in helping the NCIS team stop a top-secret defense plan from being stolen in hopes of finding her daughter Amanda. Lee is used as bait to capture her contact, Ted Bankston, who claims his wife is being held captive. During the investigation, Amanda turns out not to be Lee's daughter, but her younger adopted sister, with Lee admitting she lied to win Gibbs' help. Bankston turns out to be the mastermind in the caper and takes Lee hostage, as Gibbs corners them on a bus. Gibbs receives minor wounds in the ensuing gun battle. Ziva and Tony find Amanda strapped to a trigger plate connected to a bomb, and barely manage to free her safely. Upon learning that Amanda is safe, Lee gives Gibbs a signal to shoot and is shot and killed along with Bankston. Gibbs takes Lee's badge and gives it to Amanda as the team sorts out Lee's ultimate role in the plot; hero or villain.
123	10	"Road Kill"	Thomas J. Wright	Steven Kriozere	December 2, 2008	610	18.52
The team investigates the death of a petty officer who died in a car accident, but the agents suspect foul play. The petty officer's death was thought to be connected to a fight club. He was killed instead by a man who was blackmailed by a criminal using a female online profile to lure married men. When the man is found dead at the petty officer's home, a fight club partner is the prime suspect. Meanwhile, Tony engages in an online air-guitar contest that Ziva finds childish, but she takes to heart Tony's words of having choices and the episode ends with Ziva playing air guitar.
124	11	"Silent Night"	Tony Wharmby	George Schenck & Frank Cardea	December 16, 2008	611	19.94
The fingerprints of a presumed-dead petty officer and Vietnam War veteran, Ned Quinn (Peter Coyote), turn up at the scene of a double homicide. Claiming innocence, Quinn explains he was in the garage working for the victims when they were murdered. While fighting with metro police who want Quinn prosecuted immediately, the team discovers evidence linking a security guard to an emptied safe at the crime scene. During the case, Quinn is convinced by Gibbs to rejoin his family for Christmas.
125	12	"Caged"	Leslie Libman	Alfonso H. Moreno	January 6, 2009	612	19.10
While investigating the murder of a dead marine whose skeleton was found, McGee heads to a women's prison, hoping to retrieve a written confession from a prisoner convicted of similar crimes, but all hell breaks loose when the inmates riot and take over the prison. A guard is found dead during the riot and the inmates hold McGee and two guards as hostages, wanting only the murderer to be brought to justice. The warden issues a deadline for the inmates to surrender by sundown, forcing Gibbs and his team to race against the clock to not only uncover the true identity of the murderer but to also save McGee's life.
126	13	"Broken Bird"	James Whitmore Jr.	Jesse Stern	January 13, 2009	613	18.62
When investigating the death of a sailor, a female bystander attacks Ducky and he is stabbed in the hand with the same murder weapon used to commit the first crime. Gibbs and the team delve into his past to find clues and uncover some disturbing secrets about his time as a doctor while serving in Afghanistan. Meanwhile, the woman who attacked Ducky claims that he killed her brother, but is hiding behind diplomacy.
127	14	"Love & War"	Terrence O'Hara	Steven D. Binder & David J. North	January 27, 2009	614	19.20
The team investigates the murder of a Navy captain, uncovering possible treasonous acts that may have led to his death. Meanwhile, McGee meets a new love interest named Claire online but, unbeknown to him, it is actually DiNozzo.
128	15	"Deliverance"	Dennis Smith	Dan E. Fesman & Reed Steiner	February 10, 2009	615	18.03
While investigating the death of a Marine, the team finds Gibbs' Marine ID number written in blood at the crime scene. It is revealed that he helped a Colombian woman 18 years ago while on a black ops mission in South America and that her son Tomas tried to contact him about a major blackmail scheme involving the theft of several crates of assault rifles from a Marine base. Mike Franks returns to help with the case while Gibbs is forced to relive his past.
129	16	"Bounce"	Arvin Brown	David J. North & Steven D. Binder	February 17, 2009	616	18.06
A Marine imprisoned for embezzlement because of a case DiNozzo worked on three years ago is released and the Navy lieutenant who was a witness against him is found dead. Tony is put in charge of the team because of Gibbs' rule #38 ("Your case, your lead") and they discover that the Marine was framed for embezzlement and now someone is trying to silence those who really did it. Gibbs' fondness for DiNozzo is shown when he tells him how proud he is of his senior field agent.
130	17	"South by Southwest"	Thomas J. Wright	George Schenck & Frank Cardea	February 24, 2009	617	18.27
When NCIS agent Jack Patterson is killed in a drive-by, Abby feels responsible because she was supposed to meet with him. Using a painting he sent her and a business card of an NSA operative, the team discovers a woman in the desert who may have answers. Gibbs and Tony follow the local sheriff on horseback to the deserts of Arizona to find the woman. Meanwhile, Tony awaits a call that tells him how much he was left in his uncle's will.
131	18	"Knockout"	Tony Wharmby	Jesse Stern	March 17, 2009	618	15.84
Gibbs digs into Vance's past after finding out that the Director has "borrowed" his team without prior notice for an investigation into the disappearance and murder of a friend, who is also a former Marine. Meanwhile, Tony reveals he has been in a slump with women since his break-up with Jeanne Benoit.
132	19	"Hide and Seek"	Dennis Smith	Dan E. Fesman	March 24, 2009	619	17.83
A revolver is found in the effects of a Navy lieutenant commander's 12-year-old son. Gibbs and the team are dispatched to find out the origin of the weapon. Things get complicated when Abby finds brain matter on the weapon, revealing that it has been used in multiple murders, and the gun is linked back to the family. Meanwhile, McGee tries to replace Ducky's golf clubs.
133	20	"Dead Reckoning"	Terrence O'Hara	Teleplay by : Reed Steiner & Christopher J. Waild; Story by : David J. North	March 31, 2009	620	17.23
When shady CIA operative Trent Kort calls in his favor (from "Broken Bird"), Gibbs agrees to meet him at an abandoned warehouse. Upon Gibbs' arrival, he finds Kort with two dead men, claiming the men shot each other before his arrival. Gibbs and the team must work with Kort to put away one of NCIS' most-wanted, and they discover the man on the wall is just a cover for the real brain – the supposed accountant.
134	21	"Toxic"	Thomas J. Wright	Steven D. Binder	April 7, 2009	621	17.81
When a government scientist goes missing, Abby is recruited by the head of the project to carry on his work, but the team worries that she may meet the same fate as her predecessor.
135	22	"Legend"	Tony Wharmby	Shane Brennan	April 28, 2009	622	16.70
136	23	"Legend"	James Whitmore Jr.	Shane Brennan	May 5, 2009	623	16.72
Part 1 of 4: Gibbs and McGee fly to Los Angeles to work with the NCIS Office of Special Projects — Los Angeles team to solve the murder of a Marine, eventually discovering that the killing is linked to members of a terrorist sleeper cell residing in Los Angeles. The episode ends with OSP agent Grisha Callen (Chris O'Donnell) confronting a man who is revealed to be Michael Rivkin, Ziva's boyfriend and a fellow officer of the Israeli Mossad. Having found that Rivkin is in Los Angeles searching for the same terrorist cell, the NCIS team redouble their efforts to stop Rivkin while attempting to arrest a live member of the cell. Unfortunately, Rivkin complicates things by putting the terrorists to sleep (killing them) before NCIS can catch up to them. Back in D.C., Tony is forced to question Ziva's loyalty to NCIS in the aftermath of Rivkin's appearance in LA. Note: The episode introduces the team of, and serves as the backdoor pilot for, the NCIS spin-off NCIS: Los Angeles.
137	24	"Semper Fidelis"	Tony Wharmby	Jesse Stern	May 12, 2009	624	16.20
Part 2 of 4: After a security breach at the SECNAV's residence leads to the death of an ICE agent, Gibbs and the team are forced to work with ICE and the FBI to find his killer. Meanwhile, Tony finally comes face-to-face with Michael Rivkin and attempts to arrest him for operating on American soil and for killing the cell handler and the ICE agent.
138	25	"Aliyah"	Dennis Smith	David J. North	May 19, 2009	625	16.51
Part 3 of 4: Despite Ziva's efforts to help him, Rivkin dies in hospital from his injuries, with Ziva blaming Tony for his death. After Ziva's apartment is destroyed in an explosion, Gibbs, Vance, DiNozzo and Ziva travel to Israel, having been summoned there at the request of Eli David, the enigmatic head of Mossad and also Ziva's father. McGee and Abby are in Washington working on the laptop found in the wreckage of Ziva's home, discovering Ziva had vital intel on their current operation and did not share it with the rest of the team. After Ziva admits that she cannot trust Tony because he killed Rivkin, and with her loyalties torn between Mossad and NCIS, Gibbs decides to leave Ziva in Tel Aviv, where it is later shown that she has once again returned to Mossad and is embarking on a mission to stop a terrorist cell. The episode ends in a cliffhanger when it is shown that Ziva has been captured by the Somalian terrorists that Rivkin had been investigating, and terrorist leader Saleem Ulman is torturing her for information on NCIS.

== DVD special features ==
- Cast and Crew Commentaries on Selected Episodes (Region 1 only)
- "Bodies of Work" – Actor Brian Dietzen Gives a Tour of WM Creations, The Company that Created the "Bodies" used in N.C.I.S.
- "Fear: A DVD Exclusive" – An Acoustic Version of Pauley Perrette's Song "Fear"
- "Starting with a Bang" – A Look at the Season's Opening Arc
- "Horsin' Around" – Featurette Based on "South by Southwest" Episode
- "Season Six: Cruising Along" – Cast and Crew Reflect on Some of the Major Events of the Season
- "Six Degrees of Conversation" – The Cast Talks about Season 6
