= NCIS season 5 =

Season of television series

NCIS
- Season 5
- Season 5 U.S. DVD cover
- Starring: Mark Harmon; Michael Weatherly; Cote de Pablo; Pauley Perrette; Sean Murray; Lauren Holly; David McCallum
- No. of episodes: 19

Release
- Original network: CBS
- Original release: September 25, 2007 – May 20, 2008

Season chronology
- ← Previous; Season 4 Next → Season 6

The fifth season of the police procedural drama NCIS premiered on September 25, 2007, and marks the end of Donald P. Bellisario's involvement as showrunner. The new showrunner, starting from this season, is Shane Brennan. It concludes the La Grenouille storyline which ended with a cliffhanger in season four's finale, "Angel of Death". This season also includes the show 100th episode and reveals more background information about Gibbs.

The Writers Guild strike limited episode production and the DVD set had five discs instead of six. The season ended with its 19th episode on May 20, 2008; the strike-caused gap is between episodes 11 and 12. The season ended with a two-part season finale called "Judgment Day". The season also featured the departure of recurring characters Colonel Hollis Mann and Jeanne Benoit, as well as the death of Jenny Shepard, one of the main characters.

From this season on, the opening sequence was shortened to 30 seconds instead of the normal 37–44 seconds that was present in the previous seasons.

This is the first season to feature Rocky Carroll as NCIS Assistant Director (and later promoted to Director) Leon Vance. Carroll debuted in the 14th episode of this season “Internal Affairs”.

== Cast and characters ==
=== Main ===
- Mark Harmon as Leroy Jethro Gibbs, NCIS Supervisory Special Agent (SSA) of the Major Case Response Team (MCRT) assigned to Washington's Navy Yard
- Michael Weatherly as Anthony DiNozzo, NCIS Senior Special Agent, Second in Command of MCRT
- Cote de Pablo as Ziva David, Mossad Liaison Officer to NCIS
- Pauley Perrette as Abby Sciuto, Forensic Specialist for NCIS
- Sean Murray as Timothy McGee, NCIS Junior Special Agent
- Lauren Holly as Jenny Shepard, NCIS Operations Director (Episodes 1–18)
- David McCallum as Dr. Donald "Ducky" Mallard, Chief Medical Examiner for NCIS

=== Recurring ===
- Joe Spano as Tobias Fornell, FBI Senior Special Agent
- Brian Dietzen as Jimmy Palmer, Assistant Medical Examiner for NCIS
- Darby Stanchfield as Shannon Gibbs, Gibbs' deceased wife
- Muse Watson as Mike Franks, retired Senior Special Agent for NCIS and Gibbs' former boss
- Scottie Thompson as Jeanne Benoit, Tony's girlfriend while undercover
- Armand Assante as René Benoit, NCIS target
- Susanna Thompson as Hollis Mann, Gibbs' girlfriend and Army CID Special Agent
- David Dayan Fisher as Trent Kort, CIA Agent
- Rocky Carroll as Leon Vance, NCIS Assistant Director
- Brenna Radding as Kelly Gibbs, Gibbs' deceased daughter
- Susan Kelechi Watson as Nikki Jardine, NCIS Intelligence Analyst
- Jonathan LaPaglia as Brent Langer, FBI Special Agent and former member of Gibbs' team
- Paul Telfer as Corporal Damon Werth

== Episodes ==
No. overall	No. in season	Title	Directed by	Written by	Original release date	Prod. code	U.S. viewers (millions)
95	1	"Bury Your Dead"	Thomas J. Wright	Shane Brennan	September 25, 2007	501	13.89
Part 3 of 3: After events in "Angel of Death," Tony, undercover as Anthony DiNardo, meets Jeanne's father, La Grenouille, who knows Tony's true identity. Tony later reveals himself to Jeanne, upsetting her. The team are led to believe Tony is dead after seeing his car explode on security cameras. At autopsy, Ducky discovers it is not Tony's body due to minimal scarring of the lungs, whereas Tony's had been damaged from Y pestis (in "SWAK"). Director Shepard reveals to the team that she had given Tony an undercover mission to build a relationship with Jeanne in hopes of capturing La Grenouille after spending nearly ten years searching for him. When Tony returns to NCIS Headquarters, CIA agent Kort angrily shoves him against the elevator for ruining his operation. La Grenouille asks Director Shepard for protection after deciding to quit the arms smuggling business against the CIA's wishes. Shepard refuses his plea for asylum out of devotion to her late father. The team tries to track down La Grenouille again and find his boat, but not the man himself. They believe he made his escape and leave; La Grenouille's corpse is revealed, floating in the water with a single gunshot wound on his forehead.
96	2	"Family"	Martha Mitchell	Steven D. Binder	October 2, 2007	502	16.43
A petty officer is thought to have died in a car accident until inconsistencies at the scene indicate that the petty officer was murdered and was not the driver of the crashed car. When the car's driver is later found, Ducky conducts the autopsy and discovers that she had been beaten to death and had given birth not long beforehand, leading the team to believe that the killer has taken her child. Meanwhile, Tony tries to confront his feelings for Jeanne after her departure.
97	3	"Ex-File"	Dennis Smith	Alfonso H. Moreno	October 9, 2007	503	16.36
Two women find a dead Marine Captain on an Army base. One of the women is his wife, the other is Gibbs' ex-wife. As Special Agent Gibbs and Lt. Colonel Mann conduct a joint investigation between NCIS and the Army into the murder, a DIA agent is sent to oversee Abby's handling of the Captain's laptop, which contains highly classified information. Gibbs becomes uncomfortable when he is forced into a confrontation with his girlfriend, Colonel Mann, and Director Shepard at the same time, much to the amusement of his team.
98	4	"Identity Crisis"	Thomas J. Wright	Jesse Stern	October 16, 2007	504	17.55
Ducky is angered when one of his research cadavers is revealed to have been a murder victim and was mistakenly tagged as a "John Doe" and donated to science. The deceased man is identified by the team as a career felon, who was working with the FBI to track down a man suspected of supplying people with new identities. They discover the man's murderer, an elusive individual known simply as "the Eraser", has ties with major terrorists organizations around Africa, Europe, and the U.S. With no face to ID "the Eraser", NCIS and the FBI join forces to find the suspect and Tony goes undercover with one of Fornell's rookie agents. Note: Includes a cameo appearance of the real-life NCIS Director Thomas A. Betro.
99	5	"Leap of Faith"	Dennis Smith	George Schenck & Frank Cardea	October 23, 2007	505	17.26
When a Navy lieutenant who worked at the Pentagon as an intelligence officer attempts to commit suicide by jumping off a rooftop, NCIS is called in to consult the officer. After Gibbs is able to persuade the officer to step down from the ledge, the officer is shot dead, falling to his death from the rooftop. Each member of Gibbs' team has a different theory on the murder, one of which includes the officer being a mole. Meanwhile, the team believes Abby is considering a job offer in the private sector.
100	6	"Chimera"	Terrence O'Hara	Dan E. Fesman	October 30, 2007	507	16.33
Gibbs' team is sent to investigate a death aboard USNS Chimera, a top-secret naval research ship sailing in the middle of the ocean. After boarding the ship, they find it abandoned except for a dead U.S. Navy scientist, who died from viral hemorrhagic fever. However, they suspect that they are not alone. Their investigation is further complicated by the Navy's reluctance to share information regarding the research which took place on Chimera.
101	7	"Requiem"	Tony Wharmby	Shane Brennan	November 6, 2007	506	18.15
The episode begins with Tony retrieving Gibbs from the water and trying to revive him. It is revealed that Maddie, a childhood friend of Gibbs' deceased daughter Kelly, comes to him for help after being stalked which leads to the events of Gibbs' car driving into water. While unconscious, Gibbs has a vision that he is visited by his dead wife and daughter and is reassured that everything is fine. Note: This was planned to be the 100th episode, but it was decided that Chimera was more fitting for Halloween week, so the two were switched.
102	8	"Designated Target"	Colin Bucksey	Reed Steiner	November 13, 2007	508	17.39
Gibbs and his team investigate the assassination of a Navy admiral and meet a woman whose search for her husband, a political refugee from Africa, is related to the case. It turns out that a death squad by an African dictatorship who fear that the missing husband (who they only have a vague description of) will return to lead the opposition in the country.
103	9	"Lost & Found"	Martha Mitchell	David J. North	November 20, 2007	509	17.34
While a group of boy scouts are on a visit to NCIS, Abby discovers that one of the boys was reported to have been abducted in 1998, leading the team to search for his father who is running from a murder he was accused of committing in 1998. The team launches a manhunt for the father, but are hindered by the son who warns his father in advance. During the case, Tony realizes the boy scout is a mini-DiNozzo.
104	10	"Corporal Punishment"	Arvin Brown	Jesse Stern	November 27, 2007	510	17.04
The NCIS team pays a heavy price when they try to track down a Marine, Damon Werth, who believes he is still in Iraq. After a violent confrontation in which DiNozzo, McGee, and Ziva are injured, the team realizes Werth is the subject of an experiment. Things are further complicated when a Senator's aide begins interfering with the investigation, since Werth was due to be awarded a medal by the Senator and such an incident would be bad for his public image. The team suspects that the Marine was an unknowing subject of a secret super-soldier experiment, until they discover that he had been secretly taking steroids in order to qualify for the Marines. Note: Damon Werth also appears in the Season 7 episodes, "Outlaws and In-Laws" and "Jack-Knife."
105	11	"Tribes"	Colin Bucksey	Reed Steiner	January 15, 2008	511	15.82
The NCIS team investigates when a Muslim Marine is found dead near a mosque that is suspected by the FBI of terrorist recruitment. But the investigation hits a snag when Ducky refuses to autopsy the Marine in deference to the Marine's family's religious beliefs as that the father believes that if Ducky cuts into his body, then his son will never find peace in Heaven. Meanwhile, the investigation leads the team to Hans Staiger, a terrorist known as "the Recruiter".
106	12	"Stakeout"	Tony Wharmby	George Schenck & Frank Cardea	April 8, 2008	512	14.05
When a high-tech naval radar goes missing but is found again, the team stakes an abandoned warehouse to catch the thief – using the radar as bait. But the plan goes wrong and the radar is stolen – and a man is murdered nearby. Meanwhile, Ducky has Abby and Jimmy run some anonymous blood work, and when Gibbs finds out, he realizes Ducky is holding a secret for Jenny.
107	13	"Dog Tags"	Oz Scott	Dan E. Fesman & Alfonso H. Moreno	April 15, 2008	513	15.13
When the team investigates a fatal dog mauling of a suspected drug smuggler within the K-9, Abby befriends the victim's dog, names him "Jethro", and risks her career in hopes of proving the dog's innocence to save him from being put down. The team struggles with the case, with the director threatening to end it.
108	14	"Internal Affairs"	Tony Wharmby	Jesse Stern & Reed Steiner	April 22, 2008	514	14.24
The discovery of the dead body of La Grenouille causes the Washington office of NCIS to be investigated by the FBI, with Jenny as the prime suspect for his murder. The NCIS building is shut down by the Bureau and Assistant Director Vance, relieving the Director and taking her place for the time. The team assembles discreetly at Gibbs' house and investigate for themselves and confirm that he was indeed murdered. After evidence comes to light exonerating Jenny, Jeanne Benoit reappears and blames Tony for the murder, at first, but Trent Kort (who has since, with the blessing of the CIA, taken over La Grenouille's business) arrives and claims responsibility. At the conclusion of the episode, Gibbs tells Jenny that the story she told wasn't accurate, and it is inferred that Jenny killed La Grenouille, due to Gibbs having seen the arms dealer putting the gun on the director's home desk although Gibbs does not take any action, simply stating, "Long live the queen".
109	15	"In the Zone"	Terrence O'Hara	Linda Burstyn	April 29, 2008	515	14.76
When a Marine captain is killed during a mortar attack, it turns out that he was shot. Tony and Intel Analyst Nikki Jardine are sent to Baghdad to investigate, while the rest of the team assists by investigating stateside. The team uncovers that the man he contracted to provide soil testing hired a civilian contractor in Iraq to murder him when the captain discovers the soil sample was faked. While in Baghdad, Nikki tries to make up for a Marine mistake that led to the death of the man who helped her brother when he was wounded.
110	16	"Recoil"	James Whitmore Jr.	Teleplay by : George Schenck & Frank Cardea; Story by : Dan E. Fesman	May 6, 2008	516	14.04
Ziva is working undercover to find a murderer who killed five women and cut off their fingers after they died, only for her cover to be blown. Before he can kill her, she manages to get into a fight with him and then shoot him with his own gun. The team is happy with the killer dead but some things are still unclear. Meanwhile, Ziva has an affair with one of the men suspected to be the accomplice of the killer.
111	17	"About Face"	Dennis Smith	Teleplay by : Alfonso H. Moreno & Reed Steiner; Story by : Jesse Stern	May 13, 2008	517	14.88
When investigating the death of a man at a building site, Jimmy Palmer follows a suspicious man who is snooping around, only for the man to shoot at him. Left shellshocked, Jimmy struggles to remember the man's face and thus identify him. In the end, the team finds the shooter, who tries to flee, but Jimmy manages to stop him in his car.
112	18	"Judgment Day"	Thomas J. Wright	Steven D. Binder & David J. North	May 20, 2008	518	16.52
113	19	"Judgment Day"	Thomas J. Wright	Teleplay by : David J. North & Christopher J. Waild; Story by : Steven D. Binder	May 20, 2008	519	16.52
Part I: While playing around with a gun, a couple boys discover a dead man who is later identified as former NCIS Special Agent William Decker. Director Shepard attends his funeral in Los Angeles, with Tony and Ziva tagging along as protection. Agent Decker's death was ruled a heart attack, but an encounter at the funeral leads Jenny to suspect it was murder. The Director secretly brings in Mike Franks to help her investigate, believing the murder is related to a covert mission in Paris nine years ago, involving herself, Decker, and Gibbs. Devastating results follow. Part II: In the aftermath of Jenny's death, Assistant Director Vance searches for Franks, who escaped the diner after killing the fourth gunman. Meanwhile, Tony and Ziva try to locate the one responsible, while dealing with the fallout of failing in their assignment to protect the Director. The trail points to a former hitman called Natasha, who Jenny failed to assassinate in Paris nine years previously while on an assignment that she and Gibbs were working on together. Since Gibbs killed Natasha's lover, Natasha has returned to the U.S. seeking revenge. Natasha, who never saw it coming, is killed by Franks, after Gibbs set a trap for her at Jenny's house. Gibbs burns down the house to cover up Jenny's death, making the public believe she died of smoke inhalation. In the fallout of Jenny's funeral, newly appointed Director Vance shreds a page from his personnel file in the Director's office and terminates Ziva's liaison status (sending her back to Israel), reassigns McGee to the cyber crime division, and sends Tony to the USS Ronald Reagan. Vance then gives Gibbs personnel files for his new team members.

== DVD special features ==
- Cast and Crew Commentaries on Selected Episodes ( Region 1 only )
- Requiem Revisited
- N.C.I.S. Season 5: Stem to Stern
- The Dressing Room: The Costumes and Wardrobe of N.C.I.S.
- N.C.I.S. on Location
- From Pauley to Abby: Hairspray, Lipstick and Tattoos
