= Last Man Standing (NCIS) =

- NCIS episode
- Episode no.: Season 6 Episode 1
- Directed by: Tony Wharmby
- Written by: Shane Brennan
- Original air date: September 23, 2008

Guest appearances
- Brian Dietzen as Jimmy Palmer; Liza Lapira as NCIS Agent Michelle Lee; Michael Nouri as Mossad Director Eli David; Merik Tadros as Mossad Officer Michael Rivkin; Jonathan LaPaglia as NCIS Agent Brent Langer; Jonathan Mangum as NCIS Agent Daniel T. Keating; Jenny O'Hara as Alice Brodie; Eric Jungmann as Andy Pringle; Natalie Denise Sperl as Milaana Shishani

Episode chronology
← Previous "Judgment Day (Part II)"	Next → "Agent Afloat"
- NCIS season 6

"Last Man Standing" is the first episode of the sixth season of the American police procedural drama NCIS, and the 114th episode overall. It originally aired on CBS in the United States on September 23, 2008. The episode is written by Shane Brennan and directed by Tony Wharmby, and was seen live by 18.03 million viewers.

In the fifth-season finale, Lauren Holly's character, Director Jenny Shepard, was killed off in a gun fight following Holly's decision to leave the show. Shortly afterwards, the new director disbands the team, presumably as a form of punishment for failing to prevent Shepard's death. The premiere picks up four months later and follows Gibbs' efforts to adjust while still hoping that Tony, Ziva, and McGee will be allowed to return; it also initiates a new story arc surrounding a mole in the agency that was developed later in the season.

== Plot ==
The episode opens showing Ziva in a Moroccan bar, dressed up and singing "Temptation" by Tom Waits. It quickly becomes clear that she is undercover, and after a subject of interest leaves abruptly, a bomb explodes, destroying the room.

Gibbs is struggling to adjust to a new team after Director Vance scattered his previous one four months earlier, sending McGee to the cyber crimes unit, Ziva to Israel, and deploying DiNozzo on an aircraft carrier. He is unsatisfied with Keating (Jonathan Mangum), Langer (Jonathan LaPaglia), and Lee (Liza Lapira), the agents assigned to him, feeling their personalities to be incompatible and their skills mediocre. Abby, who has crafted photo collages of Ziva, Tony, and McGee, pleads with him to get them back.

They are called to investigate the case of murdered petty officer Steve Vargo, and Ducky determines that he was killed over 4 months ago, and the killer had covered the victim's face with a pillow before shooting him, leading them to believe that the perpetrator is inexperienced or reluctant to kill. Shortly afterwards, Gibbs and the new team discover that the case is connected to a bombing in Morocco. While viewing ZNN news footage covering the aftermath of the bombing, Gibbs recognizes an injured Ziva being carried out on a stretcher from the ruins of the bar. He frantically attempts to contact her, and Keating is able to supply the phone number of her father, Eli David (Michael Nouri). Ziva, who is alive and recovering, explains the purpose of her undercover assignment over the phone and admits to missing the team.

During the phone conversation, Gibbs finds that Vance was involved in Ziva's undercover case; when Gibbs asks Vance about it, the latter admits his endgame: 5 months earlier he was contacted by Vargo, who claimed he was being blackmailed into leaking classified Navy Intel. After agreeing to meet with Vance face-to-face, Vargo never showed - he was reported missing the next day. Based on the info he had, Vance determined the blackmailer was one of three NCIS Agents - Lee, Langer or Keating. He only broke up the old team to form a new one, so Gibbs could help him identify which one is the mole.

He also used the old team to further his investigation: McGee was sent to Cyber to break into Vargo's computers while Ziva was sent back because Vargo was a Middle-East specialist - her target was Vargo's best friend. Tony, currently on the carrier USS Seahawk is then asked by McGee and Gibbs to hack information to find what the mole was after, and discovers Operation Domino: the US' plan in the event of an attack on the Middle East. McGee begins investigating Gibbs' new team after it is discovered that Vargo had been calling Agent Lee, only for her to dispute it and say he was asking for legal advice. Gibbs and Vance learn of Palmer's relationship with Lee, solidifying her alibi.

Langer and Keating become anxious when they realize that their bank records are being viewed, and Lee informs them that they are being investigated. As Vance and Gibbs begin to interrogate Keating, Langer and Lee decide to "check out" the computer archive center, despite it being prohibited. Moments later, Gibbs gets a frantic call from Lee, claiming that Langer is the mole. Gunshots are heard through the phone, and they rush to help her, finding a frightened Lee and dead Langer.

To Abby's delight, Vance begins to reverse the disbanding of the original team: McGee is reassigned to Gibbs' team, and Eli David agrees to allow Ziva to return to agency. In a private conversation, Eli tells Vance, "Use her well, Leon. Ziva is the sharp end of the spear." Agent Lee leaves to return to her old position; however, in private, Lee receives a text asking "Do they suspect?" and it is revealed through a brief sequence of flashbacks that she was the mole.

== Production ==
The episode was written by Shane Brennan, who was executive producer at the time, and directed by Tony Wharmby. The premiere date was announced on June 26, 2008.

NCIS underwent casting changes, some brief and others permanent, to accommodate the plot; Rocky Carroll was promoted to a series regular to replace Lauren Holly's character as the agency's director. Several weeks before "Last Man Standing" aired, it was announced that Jonathan Mangum, Liza Lapira and Jonathan LaPaglia would appear as Gibbs' replacement team, playing the roles of NCIS agents Daniel T. Keating, Michelle Lee, and Brent Langer respectively. However, it was confirmed that Michael Weatherly, Sean Murray, and Cote de Pablo would still appear. The episode also marks the first appearances of Michael Rivkin (Merik Tadros) and Ziva's father, Eli David (Michael Nouri), both of whom play a pivotal role in the season's finale arc.

A photo of Cote de Pablo's character, Ziva, appearing as a bar singer undercover became a subject of interest before the episode aired. Brennan addressed questions raised: "Without giving away too many secrets, the answer to why Ziva is dressed in a sexy, backless dress and singing in a smoky bar will be answered in the opening moments of the season 6 premiere, so fans won’t have to wait long to find out the 'why' of it. But I can divulge one more piece of the puzzle: the 'where' of it. The bar is in Morocco. And did I mention that in the opening episode a member of Gibbs' team gets blown away?"

Cote de Pablo, who performed in the theatre prior to joining NCIS, supplied all of the vocals during the scene in which Ziva sings while undercover in a bar. She admitted that she had initially been opposed to the scene and was reluctant to sing on the show at all, saying, "They've been toying with the idea for maybe two years of having Ziva sing. From the beginning, I said, 'No way.' I think literally you'd be jumping the shark. What else do we have left here? Let's make the character tap dance and sing...Then Shane (Brennan) clearly put it in a way I couldn't resist." She added that the costuming was radically different from what the "low-maintenance" Ziva is typically shown wearing: "We added a dress. We heightened the eyes a little bit. They gave me sultry, jazz music to sing along to and that in itself is such a different thing for the character."

De Pablo later recorded a full performance of "Temptation", with some lyrics in French, that was released with the NCIS: The Official TV Soundtrack album on February 10, 2009.

== Reception ==
=== Ratings ===
"Last Man Standing" was seen live by 18.03 million viewers. As a result, it was up in viewers compared to the previous episode, the fifth-season finale, as well as the most watched CBS primetime show during the week of September 22–28, 2008. Shortly after the episode aired, it was reported, "NCIS has been a consistent ratings leader and is one of the few prime time dramas that continues to gain viewership as it ages." It was also noted that the show drew more viewers than in the previous season premiere, while, House, its main competitor at the time, drew fewer.

=== Critical Reviews ===
"Last Man Standing" was generally received well. Allison Waldman from AOL TV summarized the episode: "So, it turns out that Vance is smarter than we thought and the break up wasn't a punishment but a strategy cooked up by the director to get Jethro to flush out a spy in NCIS. The fact that Lee appears to be the double agent, and that Gibbs and Vance seemingly believe that she killed the 'real' spy -- Langer -- is part of a larger story." She also praised Cote de Pablo's singing and the scenes depicting McGee working in cyber crimes. Allison Stein from Firefox News wrote, "Season premiere taunts us with a sexy siren song, double-secret probation, and a traitor on the new team...The script is solid and the acting is excellent as always, the tension level is consistently high, and the story arc promises many surprises as the season progresses."
