= Too Romantic =

- Directed by: Todd Field
- Written by: Todd Field
- Produced by: Robert Romanus
- Starring: Mab Ashforth; Sean Murray
- Cinematography: Dave Perkal
- Edited by: Barry S. Silver
- Music by: Tommy Dorsey
- Distributed by: Mercury Film
- Release date: 1992
- Running time: 30 minutes
- Country: United States
- Language: English
- Budget: $400.

Too Romantic is a 1992 dramatic short film that Todd Field created while a fellow at the AFI Conservatory. It was his directorial debut. It is a dramatic piece about a fifteen-year-old boy taking a road trip with his recently widowed grandmother. The piece is notable in that it was Field's first project as a writer/director and his first introduction to many of the collaborators he continued to work with on subsequent projects, including his Academy Award-nominated features In the Bedroom and Little Children.

== Premise ==
Too Romantic is about a fifteen-year-old boy taking a road trip with his recently widowed grandmother.

== Cast ==
- Sean Murray as Tim
- Mab Ashforth as Goose
- Glen Vernon as Barney
- Dorothy Blass as Lil
- Scott Adair as Bell Man
- Allison Duboise as Waitress
- Alida P. Field as Swan Girl
