= Timothy McGee =

Fictional character

Timothy "Tim" McGee
- NCIS character
- Sean Murray as Tim McGee in a promotional photo for NCIS.
- First appearance: "Sub Rosa"
- Portrayed by: Sean Murray; Charles Tyler Kinder (teenager)
- Voiced by: Paul Corning (NCIS: The Video Game)

In-universe information
- Full name: Timothy Farragut McGee
- Aliases: Thom E. Gemcity, Elf Lord, Mcgoo, Probie, a variety of nicknames starting with “Mc” and followed by a word related to the current events of the episode, Bambino
- Gender: Male
- Family: Admiral John McGee (father, deceased); Mrs McGee (mother); Sarah McGee (younger sister); Penelope Langston (paternal grandmother); Admiral Nelson McGee (paternal grandfather, deceased); Lauren Redding (paternal half-sister)
- Spouse: Delilah Fielding
- Children: Mateo Garcia (son); John "Johnny” McGee II (son); Morgan McGee (daughter)
- Nationality: American

Career at NCIS
- Position: Acting Director (2022; 2024), Senior Field Agent, NCIS Major Case Response Team (2016–present); Field Agent, NCIS Major Case Response Team (2004–2016); Probationary Field Agent, NCIS Norfolk Field Office (2003–2004)
- Rank: Senior Special Agent
- Years of Service: 2003–present

Timothy Farragut "Tim" McGee (/mæˈɡiː, mə-/) is a fictional character from the CBS television series NCIS, portrayed by Sean Murray. McGee specializes in cybersecurity and computer crime, and is a graduate of Massachusetts Institute of Technology.

Murray appeared as a guest star in eight episodes of the first season of NCIS. In season two, he joined the main cast, and was added to the opening credits. In season 20, McGee became the show's main character and remains to this day.

== Background ==
McGee was born in Bethesda, Maryland, on September 13, 1978, to an Irish American family. He spent his childhood in Alameda, California, as his father was a naval officer stationed there. His parents bought him his first car, a 1984 Camaro Z28 five-speed, the day he turned 16. McGee crashed into a bus while trying to figure out how to use the windshield wipers. He got a student pass the day he got out of traction. He earned a bachelor of science degree in biomedical engineering from Johns Hopkins University and a master of science degree in computer forensics from MIT. His college GPA was 3.9, as he failed a fencing class in his sophomore year.

McGee worked at the NCIS field office in Norfolk, Virginia, before being transferred to the headquarters in the Washington Navy Yard, a move made permanent at the end of the season-two episode "See No Evil."

McGee has a younger sister, Sarah, who is played by Troian Bellisario (Murray's stepsister in real life). Sarah attends Waverly College and intends to be a writer like her older brother. A teenage McGee is played by Charles Tyler Kinder in the season 16 episode "Once Upon a Tim".

== Development ==
=== Characterization ===
Special Agent Timothy McGee, commonly referred to by Special Agent Anthony DiNozzo as "Probie", "McGeek", "McQueen", "McGoo", "Probie wan kenobi", "McProbie", "Baldy McBald", "McDigit", "Timmy MaGee", and even "Elf Lord", is part of a major case squad led by Special Agent Gibbs. He gained his field agent status when he was transferred to Washington from Norfolk.

In addition to responding to crime scenes and conducting investigations (along with the rest of the field team), McGee also serves as Gibbs' computer consultant and frequently assisted Abby Sciuto in the forensics laboratory when necessary. As a computer expert, McGee is stereotypically portrayed as tending to speak in technical jargon, and Sciuto and he both fulfill the "scientific/technological geek as sidekick" trope common to law-enforcement procedural shows.

During the first few seasons, McGee was portrayed as timid and inexperienced. In the season-three episode "Probie", he was visibly shaken after killing his first suspect, though it was in self-defense and his teammates backed him in the subsequent investigation. When questioned about McGee's guilt, Gibbs commented that McGee "doesn't know how to lie". His character was almost entirely altered by the season-six episode "Caged", evolving into a bolder and more assertive character. Critics such as Looper's Alex G were still commenting on this personality change as late as 2022. McGee's voice also changed around this time, becoming lower and more raspy. Fans noted that this could be because of the attempt to portray his character as darker and cooler, but Murray also lost about 25 pounds between seasons, which can also cause voice changes. In 2023, Murray himself commented on the growth of the character, noting that he had spoken to the writers early in the series about incorporating such an evolution as the series progressed.

Following Gibbs' brief retirement and Tony's subsequent promotion, he becomes the senior field agent. He takes on the role very seriously, gaining Tony's respect. Tony later stops calling him "Probie" and starts calling him "Tim". He is shown to be very protective of his younger sister, Sarah, especially when she shows up after apparently committing a murder. He hides the case from his team to protect her, while simultaneously launching an investigation into the case in the episode "Twisted Sister".

== Appearance ==
Timothy McGee has green eyes and brown hair. He was overweight until the end of season six; during the seventh season, he was shown to be losing weight. When DiNozzo pesters him about it, McGee replies that he has lost 15 pounds. McGee's weight loss led to speculation that Sean Murray, the actor who portrays McGee, was ill; in October 2010 Murray, via his Twitter account, explained that it was a deliberate weight loss by dieting, consuming only organic food, and abstaining from alcohol and sugar. Murray has lost 25 pounds.

In his initial appearances, McGee always wore a suit, dress shirt, and necktie. From season four, he stopped wearing neckties and adopted a slightly more open-collar look. From season seven, he began frequently wearing leather jackets and bomber jackets over his shirt. For the first 14 seasons, McGee had a clean-shaven appearance; during his time being held hostage in Paraguay between seasons 14 and 15, he grew a goatee, which he has kept since his return to NCIS.

== Hobbies ==
McGee has a passion for jet packs and computers, and enjoys playing games relating to tactical warfare and covert infiltration. This is shown to be an interest shared by his sister Sarah in the episode "Red Cell", when she takes over his live war game as he leaves his apartment. In the episode "Broken Bird", his first computer was revealed to have been a Mac SE, followed by a PowerBook, and finally a PC. He uses a Logitech Y-SAE71-SK-2930 keyboard to carry out his everyday work. In the episode "Ignition", he discusses his fascination with jet packs, even going so far as to show Gibbs a film he has made about them (produced under his pen name "Thom E. Gemcity", an anagram of Timothy McGee). Gibbs allows McGee to take the lead in the case because of this knowledge.

McGee is also shown to be an expert tracker, being able to find a cadaver without the assistance of dogs by reading changes in the land and observing bird droppings. He revealed he was a Scout, which occupied his time while his father was deployed. He even said, "I love the outdoors", much to the chagrin of the more city-like DiNozzo. However, at least twice McGee has encountered poison ivy and suffered severe rashes.

=== Deep Six series ===
In the episode "Dead Man Talking", McGee is revealed to be writing mystery/crime stories, and in the episode "Twisted Sister", it is revealed he has published a book entitled Deep Six. In the episode "Cover Story", McGee has been shown to be successful as a writer, and garnered a fanbase. It was kept a secret from the NCIS team for a long time. Under his pseudonym "Thom E. Gemcity", he has penned at least two novels as part of the Deep Six series, one published and one in progress. This aspect of the character has been suggested to pay homage to novelist Clive Cussler, specifically that "Bellisario may have acknowledged the possible debt NCIS owes to Cussler by having Special Agent Timothy McGee (Sean Murray) write best-selling mystery-crime novels under the series' title, Deep Six".

The title of the first book, Deep Six: The Continuing Adventures of L.J. Tibbs (whose name and character are based on Leroy Jethro Gibbs) suggests previous novels exist, but these have yet to be named, though the cover of McGee's first revealed book states that it is volume one. The next of McGee's books to be released, a sequel, is entitled Deep Six: Rock Hollow. Sean Murray commented, "As Thom E. Gemcity, he takes many liberties. I don't know if he knew the first book was going to be as successful as it was. But now he's got to run with it. I'm sure success has just increased his level of anxiety." In the episode "Cover Story", Rock Hollow becomes a focal point in that the NCIS team is investigating two murders (both committed because their killer thought they had robbed a convenience store and killed the clerk, as it was written in the book), when McGee is pressured to, and reveals everything that has taken place has been part of the book he is currently writing. The story was then found to be stolen from the typewriter ribbon McGee threw away, and that Abby could be the next victim.

McGee's writing has given him enough fame to be feted as a minor celebrity, and he can enjoy perks such as VIP clubbing, as seen in the episode "Friends and Lovers". McGee has ostensibly used the profits from his writing to purchase a Porsche Boxster (seen in the episode "Twisted Sister") and an Armani leather jacket (seen in the episode "Dead Man Walking"). He later mentions that he put the rest into a hedge fund, which crashed.

The characters in McGee's books are actually based on the characters in the NCIS team, with Leroy Jethro Gibbs as L.J. Tibbs, Anthony DiNozzo as Tommy, Ziva David as Lisa, Abby Sciuto as Amy Sutton, Jimmy Palmer as Pimmy Jalmer, and himself as McGregor. The episode "Smoked" reveals that in his novel Deep Six, McGee portrays "Tommy" and "Lisa" as lovers, "Pimmy" as a necrophiliac (a reference to Jimmy's job as Ducky's assistant in the autopsy room), and "Tibbs" as in love with a lieutenant colonel (mirroring Gibbs' brief relationship with Lt Col Hollis Mann). Unimpressed, Tony and Ziva subject McGee to relentless teasing and tormenting for the rest of the episode. Jimmy especially disliked his portrayal, and refuses to give McGee a ride back to NCIS headquarters.

== Relationships ==
=== Romantic ===
In season one, in "Sub Rosa", McGee went out on a lunch date with Abby Sciuto.

In the season-10 finale, McGee began dating Delilah Fielding (Margo Harshman), a Department of Defense "cryptologist in a dark office". In season 11, the team meets her while investigating a case. In the season-11 episodes "Kill Chain" and "Double Back", Delilah is left badly injured in a missile attack at a black-tie event McGee and she are attending. While McGee is not seriously injured, Delilah is left permanently paralyzed due to shrapnel embedded in her spine, and she thereafter uses a wheelchair; McGee struggles to cope with the thought of her being injured. She soon recovers from the incident and continues to assist the NCIS team. In the episode "Page Not Found", McGee confides in Tony that he is planning to ask Delilah to move in with him; Delilah later reveals to Tony that she wants to take a job opening for a senior intelligence analyst, which would require her to move to Dubai for a year. Tony then separately tells the two about their other half's plans; McGee encourages her to take the job and they agree to continue their relationship, albeit long-distance. McGee also gives her a copy of his house key, which she accepts, reiterating her intent to move in with him after her assignment is over.

Delilah returns to Washington in season 12, and they resume their relationship. He proposes to her in the episode "Love Boat", which she happily accepts. They are married by Jimmy in "Something Blue" shortly after finding out that they are expecting. In "Voices", McGee learns that Delilah is having twins, a boy and a girl, and in the next episode, she gives birth to John "Johnny" McGee, named after Tim's father, and Morgan McGee, named after a former cop turned security guard who died saving Tim's life.

McGee later discovers that he has an illegitimate son born from a previous relationship.

=== Field team ===
As the junior field agent of the team, McGee is often subject to teasing from DiNozzo, Kate, and Ziva, often together (though Kate and Ziva's teasing is not as mean-spirited as DiNozzo's), and, to some extent, Gibbs, though he does not come to head-smack him until later, unlike Kate and DiNozzo, who do so simultaneously on the day of his promotion, almost immediately after Tim mentioned the word "hazing". In one episode, Gibbs walked into the lab, found him lying on the floor on his back while working on the underside of Abby's hotbox, and quipped, "Special Agent Goodwrench?" In "Forced Entry", he is tricked by Tony and Kate into drinking Gibbs' coffee, which is considered a major taboo. In subsequent episodes, Tony often pulls his seniority card by taking advantage of McGee's naivete and tricking him into performing less desirable tasks such as searching for a gun in a muddy ditch with only a metal detector, and bagging bear poo while investigating a bear attack, brushing off McGee's protests with "because I can". In "Singled Out", a frustrated McGee futilely tells Tony to stop calling him "Probie"; Gibbs later tells McGee that his former mentor Mike Franks still calls him "Probie", though he retired nearly a decade ago. McGee's most notable nicknames come from DiNozzo, either "Probie", due to his junior (probational) status on the team, or "McGeek", alluding to McGee's intelligence. DiNozzo uses multiple variations on both of these names to make fun of McGee, some of which are clever but not demeaning (McGPS, McProof, the Great McOz), some which are mocking (McLawyer, McGiggle, McGoo, McNerd, McFlowerPower), some of which seem irrelevant (McTim), and some intended to deliberately cause offense (Baldy McBald). When Tony discovers that McGee's online gaming name was "Elf Lord", it is often referenced by the team members through jokes and light-hearted teasing; Gibbs has occasionally called him Elf Lord in season five.

As with most new agents who had experience with Gibbs, McGee finds him difficult to work with due to his unorthodox management style and unpredictable temperament, with Tony constantly giving him tips on how to get along with Gibbs. Initially, he is intimidated by Gibbs, especially after incurring his wrath having accidentally drunk or spilled his coffee several times during his earlier seasons. Gibbs himself is shown to gain more respect of McGee over time, as his personality matures and he becomes a more assertive character. Gibbs has also shown substantial trust and faith in his abilities over the course of time. In the episode "Witness", Gibbs sends McGee to check out a possible murder of a Navy petty officer, and lets him decide whether to call an investigation. He lets McGee accompany him into the interrogation room while still a "probie", and allows him to interrogate a suspect alone as early as the season-three episode "Deception". McGee is always shown as a computer consultant to Gibbs.

Ziva has had a friendly relationship with McGee since her start at NCIS. While Ziva teases McGee a great deal, often with Tony, they remain on friendly terms (Ziva's teasing is far more playful than Tony's, who takes a much more sadistic approach to the pranks he pulls on McGee). McGee was the first person to point out that Ziva was avoiding Tony at the start of season seven, and that sooner or later, she would have to straighten out that relationship. He is much more comfortable and confident around Ziva than her predecessor, Kate Todd.

McGee lives near Ziva, in Silver Spring (a Maryland suburb of DC). When Ziva was in Israel between seasons five and six, McGee and she emailed each other once a week. McGee has been to Ziva's house at least once; he was invited to her dinner party in season three. McGee was also the one to show Ziva some routes to work from the area where they live, and in return, she gave him an apple – which Tony immediately stole before McGee was aware of the gift. Throughout season seven, as Ziva prepares to become an American citizen, McGee supports her, even testing her, and attends her naturalization ceremony.

When McGee was introduced in "Sub Rosa", Todd protested DiNozzo's apparent abuse of authority when he ordered McGee to stay on a crime scene until someone else can come to relieve him. Todd and McGee were partnered for a very short time in the episode "UnSEALed", during which he came to her aid when she was tied up by a former Navy SEAL.

Throughout season two, DiNozzo and Todd would sometimes gang up on McGee to tease him, but Todd generally disapproved of DiNozzo's pranks and hazing of McGee. After the murder of a witness under McGee's watch, Todd was the first to try to comfort him.

In the episode "See No Evil", the air conditioning of the building is down. McGee tries to personally upgrade the network wiring since the union will not do it due to the heat. When Kate discovers him under her desk, she believes McGee is trying to look up her skirt, and despite McGee's protests, drags him up from underneath by his ears. Seconds later, McGee tells Tony he did not look, and Tony says he believes him, only for him to ask if Kate is a "pantyhose or a thong girl", but McGee does not reply as Kate responds by elbowing DiNozzo in the stomach.

After Todd's death, like the rest of the grief-stricken team, McGee had to cope with the loss of a friend, and like DiNozzo, would fantasize about her. Later, McGee is shown mourning with DiNozzo over Todd's dead body.

Following Gibbs' retirement, McGee is promoted to senior field agent after DiNozzo was promoted to team leader, after which Tony displays increased respect for McGee. With Ziva's departure in the episode "Aliyah", McGee is promoted to be Tony's partner in the field, and their relationship in the episode "Truth or Consequences" is shown to be friendly. For example, Tony used McGee's first name, Tim, more often and has not called him Probie since season seven began. He is shown on friendly, even familial, terms with every member of the team.

In "Probie", McGee, who was deeply shaken after killing someone (later revealed to be an undercover policeman) in self-defense, later confesses to Tony feelings of inferiority to the rest of the team, as he is the only field agent on Gibbs' team to have little experience in using weapons compared to his colleagues (Tony was a cop, Gibbs was a sniper, Kate was previously in the Secret Service, while Ziva was a highly skilled Mossad operative).

In season 11, with the transfer of Ellie Bishop from the NSA to NCIS, McGee has begun to assert his seniority. He used some of Tony's old pranks on Bishop, such as using a trick coin when tossing to see who has to retrieve a corpse from a septic tank.

In the season-13 final episode, "Family First", with DiNozzo having resigned from the team for good, McGee is promoted to senior field agent and becomes the show's main character.

=== Abby Sciuto ===
McGee had an extended relationship with forensics technician Abby Sciuto in season one, but no direct reference is made to their relationship ending. Despite this, they are still very close and often tease each other about their previous relationship/dates (sexual jokes, suggestive comments, etc.), and in some instances Abby has shown jealousy of attention women have given McGee. In contrast to Tony DiNozzo, McGee has had few relationships, or possible ones, almost all of which have begun and ended in the same episode.

In "Sub Rosa", McGee's first appearance in season one, McGee asks Tony about Abby. Tony responds that she is not his type, stating that as he has never had the urge to tattoo his butt, they would have little in common. At the end of the episode, McGee tells Tony that he went to get the word Mom tattooed on his butt to impress Abby.

In season five, McGee has issues with a girl who stole his heart and his credit, when he asks for help from Abby, she tells him, "I love you McGee and that should be enough".

When in stressful or uncomfortable situations, as seen in the episode "Grace Period", while trying to deal with the death of a friend, McGee often retreats to the forensics lab for reassurance from Abby.

McGee owns a dog called Jethro, that was accused of murdering a petty officer during the season-five episode, "Dog Tags". Abby looked after him and named him after Gibbs, but because her landlord would not let her have a dog in her apartment, she forced McGee to take him.

Aside from Gibbs' basement, McGee's home has been shown in the most episodes of all the series' characters. Various characters have been inside at one point or another; namely Tony DiNozzo, Ziva David, Caitlin Todd, Sarah McGee, Abby Sciutoo and Abby's previous boyfriend/stalker, Mikel.

In the season-9 episode, "Life Before His Eyes", Abby and McGee are shown as a happy couple in the alternate reality scenarios.

=== Dr. Donald "Ducky" Mallard ===
Ducky is one of the few individuals to use McGee's full given name of Timothy, as illustrated in "See No Evil". As with Abby, Ducky at times adopts a fatherly attitude towards Tim as demonstrated in the season-four episode "Smoked". Ducky's fatherly relationship with McGee mellows into one of mutual respect.

=== Director Vance ===
In the episode "Collateral Damage", a discussion occurred between Gibbs and Director Vance about the ideal qualities an NCIS agent should possess. Director Vance told Gibbs that in his view, McGee exemplified the model NCIS agent, in sharp contrast to Gibbs, who prefers agents in the mold of DiNozzo. During "Enemies Domestic", McGee seemed pretty shaken up and almost distraught after seeing the extent of Vance's injuries following the explosion.

=== Family ===
Several members of McGee's family have appeared in the series over the years. His younger sister, Sarah, first mentioned in "See No Evil", plays a prominent role in the fourth-season episode "Twisted Sister". The two differ greatly in personality, but are still very close. McGee helps clear Sarah as a potential murder suspect, and is willing to risk his NCIS career to do so. Sarah McGee is portrayed by Troian Bellisario, Murray's real-life stepsister, and daughter of series creator and former executive producer Donald P. Bellisario.

In "Hide and Seek", McGee's father is revealed as a naval officer, and stationed in California. In "The Penelope Papers", McGee's paternal grandmother, Penelope Langston (played by Lily Tomlin), is still alive and was close to McGee when he was young. While talking to Penelope, McGee reveals that his father and he have not spoken in seven years; Penelope and McGee agree that McGee's father is like Gibbs, in that both love McGee, but have difficulty expressing their affection. The casting of Jamey Sheridan as McGee's father was announced in February 2013. The role was described as "complex and layered" by executive producer Gary Glasberg, and in the late-March episode "Squall", Sheridan appeared as Admiral John McGee. The admiral is initially considered as a prime suspect, only to reveal that he has been sick for a while and tried to keep it quiet. Tony has described McGee's family situation as akin to the film The Great Santini – a "military brat" brought up in a strict household. In "The Penelope Papers" and several other episodes, the admiral admitted to Tim his regret in not spending as much time as he should have with his family. McGee's father dies in season 12.

In "In Too Deep", McGee discovers that he has another son named Mateo Garcia (played by Patrick Keleber), whose mother Olivia Garcia (Elena Goode), was McGee's ex-girlfriend. She was kidnapped by her co-worker Leo Finch; he blamed Olivia for the death of his wife, who died after participating in a drug trial for a pharmaceutical company where Olivia used to work. After Olivia was rescued, McGee confronts Olivia for never telling him about her pregnancy and missing the eighteen years of their son's life. Later, McGee informed Olivia that he would like to be a part of Mateo’s life if Mateo will let him. In the season 23 finale "Sons and Daughters", Mateo applies for an NCIS internship, but Nick Torres discovers it to be false and confronts him when a gunshot goes off.

== Reception ==
The character's portrayal and Murray's performance were universally acclaim by critics and audiences, who praised the character's growth and development throughout the show's run. McGee's seeming inexperience in the field during early seasons was noted by critics, with Bill Keveney of USA Today describing him as "a wet-behind-the-ears computer expert" in 2005. A few months later, Noel Holston from Sun Sentinel styled McGee as the "newer, nerdier agent" of the group. In 2007, television historian Tim Brooks described him as "the earnest, conservative probationary agent with invaluable computer skills who was often the victim of Tony's pranks".

The Daily News referred to McGee as "the requisite tech wizard" of the show. Alyssa Rosenberg from The Washington Monthly suggested that the characters of McGee, "an MIT-educated geek who writes thinly veiled novels about the team", and Abby Sciuto appear as "liberal stand-ins" in contrast to more conservative figures on NCIS, such as Gibbs and Tony DiNozzo. None of the characters' political views are specified within the series, and Rosenberg stated that as a result, the show does not "demand that the audience take sides in divisive issues".

As late as 2022, fans and critics continued to comment on the change in Murray's voice circa season eight. It became darker and raspier around the same time that the character's personality became more serious. Looper writer Alex G noted that many fans believe this to be an artistic decision, but Sean Murray had just lost 25 pounds and quit smoking, both of which can change a person's voice.
