= NCIS season 1 =

Season of television series

NCIS
- Season 1
- Season 1 U.S. DVD cover
- Starring: Mark Harmon; Sasha Alexander; Michael Weatherly; Pauley Perrette; David McCallum
- No. of episodes: 23

Release
- Original network: CBS
- Original release: September 23, 2003 – May 25, 2004

Season chronology
- ← Previous; Introductory episodes Next → Season 2

The first season of the American police procedural drama NCIS was originally broadcast between September 23, 2003, and May 25, 2004, on CBS.

The first season dealt with introducing the characters and their strengths, skills, and weaknesses. Three recurring characters are also introduced: the main foe for the first two seasons, Ari Haswari; Special Agent Timothy McGee and Jimmy Palmer who replaces Gerald Jackson, Ducky's assistant, after he was shot. The season also introduces Sasha Alexander as Special Agent Caitlin Todd who serves as Special Agent Vivian Blackadder's (Robyn Lively) replacement, who was a member of Gibbs' team during the two-part JAG backdoor pilot.

== Cast and characters ==
=== Main ===
- Mark Harmon as Leroy Jethro Gibbs, NCIS Supervisory Special Agent (SSA) of the Major Case Response Team (MCRT) assigned to Washington's Navy Yard
- Sasha Alexander as Caitlin Todd, NCIS Special Agent and former Secret Service Special Agent assigned to the security detail of the President of the United States
- Michael Weatherly as Anthony DiNozzo, NCIS Senior Special Agent, Second in Command of MCRT
- Pauley Perrette as Abby Sciuto, Forensic Specialist for NCIS
- David McCallum as Dr. Donald "Ducky" Mallard, Chief Medical Examiner for NCIS

=== Recurring ===
- Alan Dale as Thomas Morrow, NCIS Director
- Alicia Coppola as Faith Coleman, JAG Commander
- Joe Spano as Tobias Fornell, FBI Senior Special Agent
- Pancho Demmings as Gerald Jackson, Assistant Medical Examiner for NCIS and Ducky's first assistant
- Patrick Labyorteaux as Bud Roberts, JAG Lieutenant from Falls Church
- Joel Gretsch as Stan Burley, NCIS Special Agent Afloat on the USS Enterprise (CVN-65) and former member of Gibbs' team
- Kent Shocknek as Guy Ross, ZNN news anchor
- Sean Murray as Timothy McGee, NCIS Probationary Special Agent who works at the Norfolk Naval Base
- Jessica Steen as Paula Cassidy, NCIS Senior Special Agent assigned to Guantanamo (GTMO or Gitmo) Bay Detention Camp in Cuba
- Tim Kelleher as Chris Pacci, NCIS Special Agent
- Rudolf Martin as Ari Haswari, rogue Mossad Agent
- Brian Dietzen as Jimmy Palmer, Assistant Medical Examiner for NCIS and temporary replacement for Gerald after he gets shot

=== Guest appearances ===
- Adam Baldwin as Michael Rainer, Navy Commander
- Eric Ladin as P.O. Thompson

== Episodes ==
No. overall	No. in season	Title	Directed by	Written by	Original release date	Prod. code	U.S. viewers (millions)
1	1	"Yankee White"	Donald P. Bellisario	Teleplay by : Donald P. Bellisario; Story by : Donald P. Bellisario & Don McGill	September 23, 2003	101	13.04
While on Air Force One, a Navy commander, Ray Trapp (Gerald Downey) who was tasked with carrying the "football" dies under mysterious circumstances, forcing an emergency landing in Wichita, Kansas. But while his death is originally thought to be a tragic accident, NCIS eventually uncovers evidence suggesting the commander was in fact murdered and that it might be connected to a possible assassination attempt on the President. Note: First episode to feature Sasha Alexander as Kate Todd, Alan Dale as Tom Morrow and Joe Spano as Tobias Fornell.
2	2	"Hung Out to Dry"	Alan J. Levi	Don McGill	September 30, 2003	102	12.08
A Marine (Brian Patrick Wade) dies during a nighttime training jump. The culprit seems to be a faulty parachute, but standard investigation reveals that the death might not have been an accident after all. Gibbs begins to believe that the supposed accident that resulted in the Marine's death might actually be murder after all, and he and Tony, along with new recruit Kate Todd, set out to find out who tampered with the dead Marine's faulty parachute and eventually sent him to his death. Note: This is the first crossover with JAG in this series, with the appearance of Lt. Bud Roberts Jr. (Patrick Labyorteaux).
3	3	"Seadog"	Bradford May	John C. Kelley & Donald P. Bellisario	October 7, 2003	103	12.39
When a driverless boat and several bodies, including that of a Navy commander, wash up on the beach, seemingly during a freelance drug deal gone sour, the media is quick to link him to drug trafficking and the evidence stacks up. Being a former Marine himself, Gibbs refuses to believe that a good officer could be so corrupt. In his efforts to clear the commander's record and good name, Gibbs uncovers a turf war between two rival drug gangs and a terrorist's scheme to knock out the national power grid. The NCIS team is aided in its investigation by a DEA Agent (played by William R. Moses), and FBI Special Agent Tobias Fornell.
4	4	"The Immortals"	Alan J. Levi	Darcy Meyers	October 14, 2003	104	11.70
The discovery of a drowned sailor in dress whites, with an officer's ceremonial sword and weights chained to his waist, sparks a suicide investigation and eventually sends the team to the USS Foster so that they can dig into the deceased officer's life and find out what his colleagues thought of him. Kate refuses to believe that the deceased sailor committed suicide as, like her, he came from a Catholic family where suicide is considered a mortal sin. Meanwhile, Abby discovers a link between the crew of the USS Foster and an MMORPG known as The Immortals, and begins searching the game for clues to help Gibbs and the team solve the case and save the ship from possible destruction.
5	5	"The Curse"	Terrence O'Hara	Teleplay by : Don McGill & Jeff Vlaming & Donald P. Bellisario; Story by : Donald P. Bellisario	October 28, 2003	105	13.50
Gibbs and the team are called in when a mummified lieutenant, who was believed to have absconded with 1.2 million dollars of stolen Navy funds nine years previously and later received a dishonorable discharge for allegedly deserting his position, is found in a half-buried cargo pod with Navy markings on it by a deer hunter deep in the woods of St. Mary's River State Park. Two former shipmates who served with the deceased come under suspicion for both the murder and the theft. Gibbs and Tony work at investigating the murder, while Kate is tasked with tracking down the missing funds, although she is more devoted to ensuring the dead lieutenant's former wife and young daughter receive his death benefits. Abby uses a computer reconstruction to work a confession out of a possible suspect.
6	6	"High Seas"	Dennis Smith	Teleplay by : Jeff Vlaming & Larry Moskowitz; Story by : Jeff Vlaming	November 4, 2003	106	11.77
One of Gibbs' former team members, NCIS Special Agent Stan Burley, who is on board the USS Enterprise investigating a case, calls for assistance when a sailor suffers a meth overdose while on leave, despite the sailor in question claiming that he's never taken the drug. Gibbs, Tony, and Kate fly out to investigate. Not long after their arrival, another sailor is admitted to sickbay under the same circumstances and later dies. The team also discovers that the crew is unusually efficient and several senior crew members are behaving strangely.
7	7	"Sub Rosa"	Michael Zinberg	George Schenck & Frank Cardea	November 18, 2003	107	13.21
NCIS Norfolk Case Agent Timothy McGee works on a case of a partially dissolved corpse found in a barrel of acid at the Norfolk Naval Base, and calls in the Major Case Response Team to help him. As the investigation continues, it soon becomes apparent that the killer took steps to prevent the body from being identified. Gibbs quickly comes to believe that the motive for the brutal murder was identity theft and his suspicions are further confirmed when it is revealed that although a submariner is dead, no one has been reported missing, leading Gibbs to believe that an impostor is on one of the submarines. Tony, Abby, and McGee are tasked with identifying the deceased, while Gibbs and Kate are sent underwater on a submarine to vet five possible suspects, one of whom might have been responsible for the murder and to also prevent a possible sarin attack from taking place. Note: This is the first episode to feature Sean Murray as Timothy McGee. He would later get promoted to a main regular starting season 2 and, as of May 2024, is now the longest serving cast member in the series.
8	8	"Minimum Security"	Ian Toynton	Philip DeGuere, Jr. & Donald P. Bellisario	November 25, 2003	108	12.71
The team heads for Cuba when Ducky and Gerald discover that a dead translator from Gitmo they have been working on has a stomach full of emeralds. NCIS Special Agent Paula Cassidy turns out to be deceitful to Tony when he is ordered to investigate her involvement, while Gibbs and Kate try to discover where the emeralds came from, how they ended up in their translator's stomach, and prevent the assassination of an important prisoner with links to Osama Bin Laden.
9	9	"Marine Down"	Dennis Smith	John C. Kelley	December 16, 2003	109	12.03
The team is called to investigate when a dead Marine's wife receives a phone call from her husband who supposedly died under suspicious circumstances. However, the case is complicated when someone impersonates the Marine's CO and Tony. As the investigation continues, the Marine turns up embalmed, having been killed two days after his funeral supposedly took place. Gibbs suspects CIA involvement, and the team soon find themselves tracking a rogue operative who killed the first Marine as a part of a cover-up in regards to a classified mission that ended in disaster and is now attempting to kill off the dead Marine's partner to make sure that the investigation is wrapped up while he flees with the money the CIA previously paid in an attempt to save the two kidnapped Marines. As such, the team find themselves racing against the clock as they attempt to rescue the deceased Marine's partner before another murder takes place and take down the rogue CIA agent once and for all.
10	10	"Left for Dead"	James Whitmore Jr.	Teleplay by : Don McGill & Donald P. Bellisario; Story by : Don McGill	January 6, 2004	110	14.51
Kate immediately develops a close, personal bond with a young woman (Sherilyn Fenn) suffering from amnesia after she wakes up and crawls from her grave in a national park following a possible murder attempt. Her memory is completely blank but the woman or "Jane Doe" claims to remember that a bomb is present on a Navy ship and that people will die unless it is found, leading Gibbs and the team on a hunt for the bomb and also to find Jane's true identity. But unknown to Kate and the team, Jane is already beginning to secretly remember her past and is planning to strike back against her employers.
11	11	"Eye Spy"	Alan J. Levi	George Schenck & Frank Cardea & Dana Coen	January 13, 2004	111	14.00
NCIS is called in to investigate the murder of a naval officer at Little Creek Naval Base following an anonymous tip-off. McGee manages to track the tip-off to Langley, suggesting that the CIA has been spying on the base. Gibbs and Kate follow the tip-off, coming across a witness who leads the team to several possible suspects. At first the murder seems to be tied in with work the officer was involved in, but Gibbs soon begins to suspect that the motive for the death might not actually be espionage-related and that someone else might be the true killer. Note: This is the second appearance of Sean Murray as Timothy McGee. McGee was added into a new scene at the last minute to fill in the episode's short runtime.
12	12	"My Other Left Foot"	Jeff Woolnough	Jack Bernstein	February 3, 2004	112	10.97
When the severed leg of a marine is discovered in a dumpster, Gibbs and the team immediately run into a problem – identifying who the leg belongs to and finding the rest of his body. Kate and Tony are ordered to find the marine's place of burial and exhume the body, only to discover that the marine to whom the leg belongs to was apparently cremated years ago by a very distraught woman claiming to be the deceased marine's sister. Gibbs talks to an old Marine buddy of his and discovers that there is more to this "sister" than meets the eye. The NCIS team decide to investigate closer to home where they uncover a mother and daughter who are both guarding a deep secret.
13	13	"One Shot, One Kill"	Peter Ellis	Gil Grant	February 10, 2004	113	13.18
When an over-embellishing marine recruiter is killed, the NCIS team quickly discover that a highly intelligent and skilled sniper was behind the attack. Initially, the team believes the sniper had a grudge against the recruiter, but when a second attack occurs the investigation takes on a wider scope and as a result, the FBI is called in, bringing Gibbs into direct conflict with his old friend Fornell. After hitting several dead ends, the team realize that the killer had left a "calling card" in the form of a white feather at each scene and was most likely targeting recruiters in revenge for being rejected by the Corps. Hoping to lure out the killer, Gibbs dons his old Marine uniform and takes over the recruitment office with Kate as his new "commanding officer".
14	14	"The Good Samaritan"	Alan J. Levi	Jack Bernstein	February 17, 2004	114	13.49
A local county sheriff calls in NCIS upon discovering a murdered lieutenant commander by the roadside, quickly followed by the murder of a civilian contractor two counties over. As the team struggle to find a motive or suspects for either case, another murder occurs; this time a naval aviator. Ducky points out that while the murders appear to follow the same modus operandi and seem to have been carried out by a serial killer, some elements are different, indicating that the murders were not carried out by the same individual which suggests that there is a copycat on the loose. A DNA sample draws suspicion onto the widow of the third victim, but she has an iron-clad alibi, leaving Gibbs and the team with a complex investigation and many loose ends to tie up.
15	15	"Enigma"	Thomas J. Wright	John C. Kelley	February 24, 2004	115	12.14
Gibbs puts his career on the line after finding out that a marine colonel, William Ryan (Terry O'Quinn) who also happens to be his former CO has absconded from Iraq with two million dollars, and returned to the States under an assumed name. The FBI, led by Fornell, believe that he staged the ambush and stole the money for himself while Gibbs denies the claim, believing he is innocent. Ryan later contacts Gibbs, and explains that he has discovered a conspiracy to siphon funds out of Iraq for use on black ops while vehemently denying any responsibility. Gibbs finds himself in a delicate situation as he realizes that Ryan is mentally unstable after the latter kept mentioning a "Lt. Cameron", Gibbs' former company XO who had died in his arms years ago. Gibbs later learns that Lt. Cameron is alive, but only in Ryan’s head and is working with Ryan to stop the conspiracy. After being arrested for "pissing off the FBI", Gibbs, along with Fornell, set out to discover the truth behind the Colonel's claims in a tense standoff and discover that Ryan had indeed been framed. With the truth out and the standoff over, Ryan is admitted into a mental hospital so that he can be treated for his paranoid schizophrenia.
16	16	"Bête Noire"	Peter Ellis	Donald P. Bellisario	March 2, 2004	116	12.82
Ducky responds to an emergency call when the Israeli Embassy sends a Royal Navy officer to NCIS for autopsy, only to find a gunman (revealed in later episodes to be recurring antagonist Ari Haswari) inside the body bag. As Ducky, Gerald and eventually Kate are held hostage in the autopsy lab, the director and Gibbs coordinate with an FBI strike team to negotiate their release. Meanwhile Gibbs is concerned that the gunman must have planned an escape route.
17	17	"The Truth Is Out There"	Dennis Smith	Jack Bernstein	March 16, 2004	117	13.29
During a rave party, the body of a petty officer falls through the basement ceiling. Preliminary investigation suggests that the petty officer was killed in the nearby parking lot, and was dressed after his death. Upon checking the victim's room, evidence surfaces that he might have been taking financial bribes or someone else may have been blackmailing him. Gibbs suspects the victim's co-workers of involvement in the death when their separate versions of events are too consistent. Forensic evidence links them to the scene, and they eventually confess that their coworker's death was a result of a prank gone wrong. However, Gibbs believes that the petty officer's death was more than just an accident.
18	18	"UnSEALeD"	Peter Ellis	Thomas L. Moran	April 6, 2004	118	10.83
Jack Curtin, a former Navy SEAL convicted of a double-homicide, escapes from Leavenworth, resulting in Kate and McGee being assigned to protect the son and in-laws of the escapee. During the night, Curtin breaks into the house to see his son before fleeing, subduing Agent Todd and taking her weapon in the process. Using her profiling skills, Kate theorizes that he may actually be innocent and had discovered the identity of the real killer while in jail. At headquarters, the team has to contend with the antagonistic defense and prosecution attorneys as they review the evidence in order to find the real killer before Curtin can take matters into his own hands.
19	19	"Dead Man Talking"	Dennis Smith	George Schenck & Frank Cardea	April 27, 2004	119	11.64
Special Agent Chris Pacci is brutally murdered while investigating a cold case, prompting a guilt-ridden Gibbs to step in and take over the case while attempting to find Pacci's killer. Picking up from where Pacci left off with McGee's assistance, the team follows the trail of millions of dollars embezzled by Navy Lt. Cmdr. Hamilton Voss (who died before trial), and is led to a mysterious woman named Amanda Reed (Jamie Luner) who seems to appear near wherever Voss has been stationed. The agents take shifts conducting a stake-out on the woman's house, until Tony is caught raiding the mailbox. Forced to improvise, he introduces himself as a resident of the neighborhood and strikes up a conversation based on what he had heard via surveillance. This gives him a chance to get close to the suspect in order to find out more, as he goes on a successful date with her. Meanwhile, Abby makes a surprising discovery about the woman's identity, which turns the direction of the case.
20	20	"Missing"	Jeff Woolnough	John C. Kelley	May 4, 2004	120	10.13
The disappearance of a marine from a bar draws NCIS in to investigate, and it is discovered that several marines from the same unit have also vanished under similar circumstances. When skeletal remains of one of the missing men is found chained to a pipe in a small sewer room, Gibbs begins to suspect the unit CO (the only team member not dead or missing) as a serial killer. However, when Tony vanishes while tailing the CO from the unit, the investigation takes on a more frantic pace and McGee is called back in from Norfolk to help as Gibbs and Kate work against the clock to find Tony before it is too late.
21	21	"Split Decision"	Terrence O'Hara	Bob Gookin	May 11, 2004	121	11.07
As Ducky meets his new assistant, Jimmy Palmer who is replacing the injured Gerald Jackson, Gibbs and the team handle the case of a marine found impaled on a tree stump after being shot with a SMAW. The investigation uncovers the sale of decommissioned military weapons on the black market. Tony goes undercover and meets the buyer, only to stumble into an undercover ATF operation. Working with ATF Special Agent Stone (Bellamy Young), Gibbs poses as a weapons supplier to complete the deal, and must double-cross everyone in order to find the corrupt person at the center of the investigation, and the one responsible for the marine's death. Note: This is the first episode to feature Brian Dietzen as Jimmy Palmer. He would later get promoted to also starring in starting season 6 and a main regular starting season 10.
22	22	"A Weak Link"	Alan J. Levi	Jack Bernstein	May 18, 2004	122	10.39
Routine training results in the death of a U.S. Navy SEAL lieutenant just days before he was due to deploy on a classified hostage rescue operation. The death is initially dismissed as an equipment malfunction, but Abby discovers that the link attaching the lieutenant to his rappelling rope was made of a weaker material than factory standard, suggesting sabotage and potentially murder. Pressure is applied by the CIA for the investigation to be wrapped up within 38 hours so the operation can continue or else the entire mission, which is of national security importance, will be scrubbed. As the case goes on, Gibbs discovers that the lieutenant had a secret, and that his wife might be holding back vital information about his death. Meanwhile, Abby deals with her relationship with McGee.
23	23	"Reveille"	Thomas J. Wright	Donald P. Bellisario	May 25, 2004	123	10.86
As Gibbs' obsession with tracking down the infiltrator who held Todd and Ducky hostage in "Bête Noire" begins reaching new heights, the team grow more concerned about him. But when Kate is kidnapped and reunited with the terrorist, Gibbs' anger goes into overdrive as he pushes McGee and Tony to find out more information about the man responsible, not realizing that Kate's life might be in great danger.

== DVD release ==
NCIS: Naval Criminal Investigative Services- The Complete First Season
Set details		Special features
23 Episodes; 6-Disc Set; English (Dolby Digital 5.1 Surround); Commentary on "Yankee White" by Co-Creator/Executive Producer/Writer/Director Donald P. Bellisario		N.C.I.S. Creating Season 1; N.C.I.S. Building the Team; N.C.I.S. Defining the Look; All the above-mentioned features are available only on the Region 1 DVD Set as the other Regions including Region 2 only have the episodes.
Release dates
Region 1	Region 2	Region 4
June 6, 2006	July 24, 2006	August 10, 2006
