= Grace Period (NCIS) =

- NCIS episode
- Episode no.: Season 4 Episode 19
- Directed by: James Whitmore Jr.
- Written by: John Kelley
- Original air date: April 3, 2007

Guest appearances
- Jessica Steen as NCIS Agent Paula Cassidy; Susanna Thompson as Army Lt. Col. Hollis Mann; Scottie Thompson as Jeanne Benoit; Shaun Duke as Azid Abu Selom; Haaz Sleiman as Abdul Wahid; Dominic Rains as Jamal Malik

Episode chronology
← Previous "Iceman"	Next → "Cover Story"
- NCIS season 4

"Grace Period" is the 19th episode in the fourth season, and the 89th overall episode, of the American crime drama television series NCIS. It first aired on CBS in the United States on April 3, 2007. The episode is written by John Kelly and directed by James Whitmore Jr., and was seen by 13.79 million viewers.

An NCIS team, led by Special agent Paula Cassidy, receives a tip about terrorist activity but it turns out to be a trap, resulting in the death of two agents. Cassidy, grief-stricken, begins blaming herself for what happened. Gibbs and his team are sent to investigate the deaths with Cassidy joining them during the investigation. While Ducky is sure that the man who Cassidy received the tip from was dead at least one day before the explosion even happened, Cassidy and Abby insist otherwise.

The episode marks the final appearance of NCIS Special agent Paula Cassidy, who is killed when she sacrifices herself to stop a suicide bomber.

== Plot ==
Two NCIS agents are killed when they follow a possible lead inside a building, which explodes. Both agents are part of NCIS Agent Paula Cassidy's team, leaving her the only one surviving the attack. Originally, Gibbs' team was supposed to be on duty for the weekend, but it was later changed by Gibbs.

Dr. Mallard proposes that the man who was in the store was a suicide bomber. Two men, Wahid and Malik, come to the store, telling the team that they are part of The Muslim Coalition for Peace that works there. Ziva finds the head of the suicide bomber, and Wahid and Malik tell the team that it's the head of their chapter president, Yazid, who was planning a conference. Later, back at the crime scene, DiNozzo finds an escape route through the wall, which the terrorist used. The team later finds that Ducky was right in saying their tip had died the day before and the terrorist had used a computer to digitally make it sound like the actual person to lead the team into a trap.

The conference continues to go forward, with a special memorial for Yazid at the building that blew up held by high-ranking Muslim clerics, who Gibbs figures to be the real targets. Malik comes out from behind the trick wall, primed with explosives on his chest. Cassidy jumps and tackles Malik, throwing him back behind the wall, and the door automatically closes behind them while also preventing Gibbs and DiNozzo from interfering.

In her final moments, Cassidy sees her teammates standing before her. Seconds later, the bomb then explodes, killing her and Malik while the sheer force of the explosion causes the building to shake.

The team are left devastated by Cassidy's death and following on from the attack, Tony arrives at Jeanne's apartment, having finally gained the courage to tell Jeanne he loves her. He does so and then embraces her while crying for Cassidy as R.E.M.'s Everybody Hurts plays in the background.

== Production ==
The episode is written by John Kelley and directed by James Whitmore, Jr. "Grace Period" refer to earlier deaths of NCIS agents. Gibbs told DiNozzo "it could have been us every single day and week, and sometimes it has", as shown in the episode "Twilight" when NCIS special agent Kate Todd is shot dead. In the commentary track on the DVD, Michael Weatherly says that "the last time [Tony] put a black band across the [NCIS] badge, it was a hole in agent Todd's forehead".

The reason why Cassidy's team had the weekend duty, not Gibbs' as it originally was intended to be, is explained by Weatherly to be because Gibbs wanted to spend some quality time with Hollis Mann instead, as shown in the start of the episode. Together with the focus on dead NCIS agents, the thought about being the one themselves is another big part of the episode. Especially McGee and DiNozzo talks about it, leading up to the death of agent Cassidy at the end of the episode.

According to Michael Weatherly, who portrays NCIS Special agent Tony DiNozzo, it takes about 9 days to shoot an episode like "Grace Period".

Three characters are recurring in the episode: Scottie Thompson as Jeanne Benoit, Susanna Thompson as Army Lt. Col. Mann and Jessica Steen as Paula Cassidy. Cassidy was last seen in season 3 episode "Mind Games", while Benoit and Mann has been in numerous episodes in season 4.

== Reception ==
"Grace Period" was seen by 13.79 million live viewers following its broadcast on April 3, 2007, with a 4.9 share among all households. A rating point represents one percent of the total number of television sets in American households, and a share means the percentage of television sets in use tuned to the program.
