= Sean Murray (actor) =

American actor (born 1977)

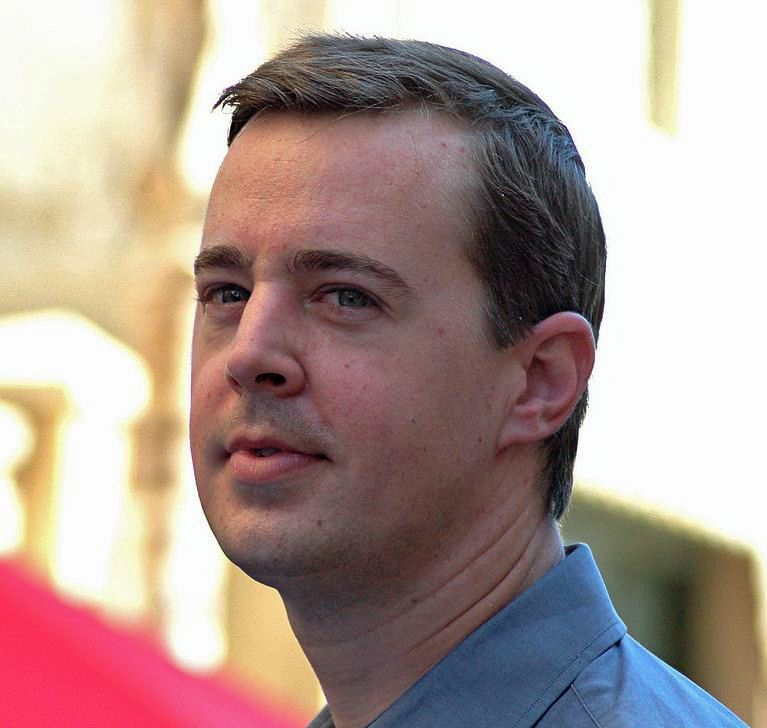
- Murray in October 2012
- Born: Sean Harland Murray; November 15, 1977 (age 48); Bethesda, Maryland, U.S.
- Occupation: Actor
- Years active: 1991–present
- Spouse: Carrie James (m. 2005; div. 2025)
- Children: 2
- Relatives: Donald P. Bellisario (stepfather); Troian Bellisario (stepsister)

Sean Harland Murray (born November 15, 1977) is an American actor known for his role as Special Agent Timothy McGee on the American TV drama NCIS, Thackery Binx in Disney's Halloween film Hocus Pocus and Danny Walden in the military drama series JAG.

== Early life ==
Sean Harland Murray was born on November 15, 1977, in the Bethesda Navy Hospital in Maryland, and grew up on several military bases all over the world including Australia, Singapore, London and the United States. When he was 15, Murray's parents divorced and he and his mother moved to Los Angeles.

Murray's father is retired Navy Captain Craig Harland Murray (surface warfare) with over 30 years of service, and his Australian mother Vivienne Lee holds dual citizenship with the United States. In 1998, she married American television producer and screenwriter Donald P. Bellisario, who became Murray's stepfather. He has one brother, NCIS: Los Angeles producer Chad W. Murray, and seven stepsiblings, including Pretty Little Liars actress Troian Bellisario and JAG actor Michael Bellisario.

== Career ==
After Murray decided he wanted to be an actor at a young age, he worked hard to try to land small parts and when he was 11 was able to become an extra in the Steve Martin and Joan Cusack film My Blue Heaven. Murray's TV credits include a starring role in the UPN sitcom The Random Years and a supporting role as teenager Zane Grey Hart in CBS's comedy/western series Harts of the West, with Beau Bridges as his father and Harley Jane Kozak as his mother. Lloyd Bridges also starred in the series. The program was set on a dude ranch in Nevada. Murray also appeared in several episodes of JAG and was later cast as Timothy McGee in the show's spin-off, NCIS. McGee's sister is played by Troian Bellisario, his real-life stepsister. In addition, Murray has appeared in several feature films, including Hocus Pocus (1993), his first motion-picture film appearance, in which he played Thackery Binx. While this is one of his most well-known roles, his voice in the film was dubbed by Jason Marsden. His other film appearances include This Boy's Life; and in Todd Field's Too Romantic.

As of May 2026, Murray is the longest-serving NCIS cast member, having debuted early in the first season.

== Personal life ==
Murray and Carrie James, a teacher, met in 2004 at an event, and they married on November 26, 2005. They had their first child, a daughter, named Cay Ryan, in 2007. The couple's second child, a son, named River James, was born in Los Angeles in April 2010. Murray and James separated in March 2024. Their divorce was finalized in May 2025.

Murray's daughter was a guest star with her father in NCIS Season 19 episode "The Brat Pack".

== Filmography ==
=== Film ===
| Year | Title | Role | Notes |
|---|---|---|---|
| 1990 | My Blue Heaven | uncredited extra | |
| 1992 | Too Romantic | Tim | Short film |
| 1993 | Hocus Pocus | Thackery Binx | |
| 1993 | This Boy's Life | Jimmy Voorhees | |

=== Television ===
| Year | Title | Role | Notes |
|---|---|---|---|
| 1987 | Songs from the Heart: Edith Wharton | Young Boy | Television film |
| 1991 | Backfield in Motion | Joe Jr. | Television film |
| 1991 | Civil Wars | Chris Conway | Episode: "The Pound and the Fury" |
| 1993 | River of Rage: The Taking of Maggie Keene | Matthew Keene | TV movie |
| 1993–1994 | Harts of the West | Zane Grey Hart | 15 episodes |
| 1995 | ER | Bret Logan | Episode: "A Miracle Happens Here" |
| 1995 | Silk Stalkings | Derek Paston | Episode: "Sweet Punishment" |
| 1995 | Trial by Fire | Danny | TV film |
| 1996 | Fall into Darkness | Jerry Price | TV film |
| 1996 | For My Daughter's Honor | Ralph | TV film |
| 1996 | The Lottery | Henry Watkins | TV film |
| 1997 | The Sleepwalker Killing | Christopher Lane | TV film |
| 1998–2001 | JAG | Ensign Terry Guitry | Episode: "Innocence" |
| 1998–2001 | JAG | Danny Walden | 6 episodes |
| 1999 | Touched by an Angel | William 'Will' Heller | Episode: "My Brother's Keeper" |
| 2000 | Boston Public | David | Episode: "Chapter Three" |
| 2001 | Spring Break Lawyer | Nick Kepper | TV movie |
| 2002 | The Random Years | Todd Mitchell | Series regular (7 episodes – 4 unaired) |
| 2003–present | NCIS | Timothy McGee | Recurring role: season 1 (8 episodes); Main role: season 2–present (490+ episodes) |
| 2004 | Dunkirk | Captain Tom Halsey | Episode: "Deliverance" |
| 2014 | Agatha Christie: Ordeal by Innocence | Leo | Radio Audio Drama |
| 2017 | NCIS: New Orleans | Timothy McGee | Episode: "Pandora's Box (Part II)" |

== Awards ==
| Award | Year | Category | Work | Result |
|---|---|---|---|---|
| Young Artist Award | 1993 | Best Youth Actor Leading Role in a Motion Picture Comedy | Hocus Pocus | Nominated |
| Young Artist Award | 1993 | Best Youth Actor Leading Role in a Television Series | Harts of the West | Nominated |
