= David Dayan Fisher =

English actor

David Dayan Fisher is an English actor from London, England. He is known for his frequent portrayal of antagonistic characters, as well as his deep voice.

Fisher has appeared in The Last Post, National Treasure, Robbery Homicide Division, Burn Notice, Charmed, 24, Numb3rs, Stargate Atlantis, and NCIS. As a voice actor, Fisher provided the voice of Xaldin, a member of Organization XIII, in the Kingdom Hearts video game franchise.

== Filmography ==
=== Television ===
Year	Title	Role	Notes
1998	The Bill	Michael Sowerby	2 episodes
2002	Robbery Homicide Division	Berman	Episode: "A Life of Its Own"
2005	Charmed	Margoyle	Episode: "Hulkus Pocus"
2006–2016	NCIS	Trent Kort	14 episodes
2006	24	Anton Beresch	3 episodes
2006	Numbers	Michael Tolchuck	Episode: "Harvest"
2006	Stargate Atlantis	Baden	Episode: "The Game"
2006	Everybody Hates Chris	Devil	Episode: "Everybody Hates the New Kid"
2010	NCIS: Los Angeles	Trent Kort	Episode: "Callen, G"
2011	Burn Notice	Miles Vanderwall	Episode: "Hard Out"

=== Film ===
Year	Title	Role	Notes
2004	American Brown	Diner Owner	Uncredited
2004	The Librarian: Quest for the Spear	Rhodes	Television film
2004	National Treasure	Shaw	
2007	Redline	Godfather	
2008	Tony 5	Jacko	
2009	Don't Look Up	Wadim	
2012	The Dark Knight Rises	Shoe Shiner	
2016	Everlasting	Maurice	
2016	Like Lambs	Mr. Drummond	

=== Video games ===
Year	Title	Role	Notes
2004	The Bard's Tale	Additional voices	
2006	Kingdom Hearts II	Xaldin	
2007	Kingdom Hearts II Final Mix	Xaldin	
2009	Kingdom Hearts 358/2 Days	Xaldin	
2010	Kingdom Hearts Birth by Sleep	Dilan	
2013	Kingdom Hearts HD 1.5 Remix	Xaldin	
2014	Kingdom Hearts HD 2.5 Remix	Dilan / Xaldin	
