= Hiatus (NCIS) =

- NCIS episodes
- The team watches as Gibbs leaves NCIS in the final scenes of "Hiatus"
- Episode nos.: Season 3 Episodes 23 and 24
- Directed by: Dennis Smith
- Written by: Donald Bellisario
- Original air dates: May 9, 2006; May 16, 2006

Guest appearances
- Muse Watson as NIS Agent Mike Franks; Brian Dietzen as Jimmy Palmer; Mary Matilyn Mouser as Kelly Gibbs; Darby Stanchfield as Shannon Gibbs; Tess Lina as Nurse Maria Baliad; Jarvis George as Navy Lt. Morgan Tolliver; Burt Bulos as Abog Galib/Pinpin Pula; Christopher Maher as Capt. Aris Mahir; Cotter Smith as NCIS Special Agent in Charge Sam Stevens; Brett Cullen as Navy Capt. Todd Gelfand; Marcus Reynaga as Paramedic (Part I only); Ariel Felix as Alon ATU (Part I only); Randy Flagler as Gibbs' C.O. (Part I only); Adam Lieberman as U.S. Customs Officer Cruz (Part I only); Aloma Wright as Nurse Ethel Washingtown (Part I only); Kevin West as Mario (Part II only); Susan Santiago as Camila Charo (Part II only); Pepper Sweeney as Cmdr Jeff Fletcher (Part II only); Tyrees Allen as NSO Deputy Director Dean Walsh (Part II only)

Episode chronology
← Previous "Jeopardy"	Next → "Shalom"
- NCIS season 3

"Hiatus" is the two-part season finale of the third season of the American police procedural drama NCIS, the 23rd and 24th episode of the season and the 69th and 70th episodes overall. The two-parter originally aired on CBS in the United States on May 9 and May 16, 2006. Both parts were written by Donald Bellisario, the show's creator and executive producer at the time, and directed by Dennis Smith. They were seen live by 15.17 million and 16.49 million views, respectively.

"Hiatus" is a two-part story arc covering the third NCIS season finale. It involves lead character Gibbs (Mark Harmon) being severely injured in a ship bombing, his subsequent memory loss, and the team's struggle to find the perpetrator before another attack. The episodes also delve into Gibbs' past, culminating in the revelation of his wife and daughter's deaths 15 years prior.

== Background ==
NCIS follows a team of government agents who work for the Naval Criminal Investigative Service. The main cast during the filming of the third season included Mark Harmon as team leader Leroy Jethro Gibbs, Michael Weatherly as Senior Agent Anthony "Tony" DiNozzo, Cote de Pablo as Mossad Liaison Officer Ziva David, Pauley Perrette as Forensic Specialist Abby Sciuto, Sean Murray as Special Agent Timothy McGee, David McCallum as NCIS Medical Examiner Donald "Ducky" Mallard, and Lauren Holly as NCIS Director Jenny Shepard.

Gibbs was originally scripted as having been married and divorced three consecutive times. His backstory was later revised to include his "first wife", Shannon, and daughter Kelly, both of whom were killed years prior. This is first implied early in the third season, and series creator Donald P. Bellisario continued to develop the idea until it came to a head in "Hiatus".

== Plot ==
=== Part I ===
Tony, McGee, and Ziva wait in a car as Gibbs contacts an undercover government agent on a Turkish ship. The agent tells Gibbs about an upcoming attack on a Marine Assault Ship. Outside, the team witnesses an explosion from the ship, which kills the agent and severely injures Gibbs, leaving him in a coma. In his comatose state, Gibbs has flashbacks of the murder of his wife Shannon (Darby Stanchfield) and eight-year-old daughter, Kelly (Mary Matilyn Mouser), and being wounded during Operation Desert Storm.

Tony becomes the temporary head of the investigation team as the group attempts to track down Pinpin Pula, a missing crew member of the ship, suspected to be a member of the Abu Sayyaf terrorist group. The team confirms the identity of the dead agent to be NCIS Special Agent Abog Galib (Burt Bulos), with whom Gibbs was supposed to be meeting.

Meanwhile, other characters are disturbed by Ziva's seeming nonchalance regarding Gibbs' serious injuries, leading Ducky to accidentally insult her by implying that she does not care. Later, Abby slaps her in a fit of anger, and Ziva responds by slapping her in turn. McGee notifies Tony, who forces a reconciliation.

Capt. Todd Gelfand, a doctor at Bethesda Naval Hospital where Gibbs is hospitalized, recognizes him from Desert Storm, having treated him back then. Jenny and Ducky learn about Shannon and Kelly from Capt. Gelfand and are left in shock at the revelation.

At the hospital, Gibbs awakens from his coma but has no memory of his friend and colleague Ducky Mallard.

=== Part II ===
Director Jenny Shepard informs the team that Gibbs has regained consciousness but cannot remember anything after 1991. He believes that he has just woken up from his wounding in Desert Storm. Tony worries that Shepard might try to take over the investigation and confronts her about it, prompting her to say that he was always going to lead the team, but she was actually testing him to see if he has as much guts as Gibbs.

Several characters attempt unsuccessfully to help an amnesiac Gibbs regain his memory since only he knows the details of an impending terrorist attack. Shepard contacts Gibbs' NCIS mentor and former partner, Mike Franks (Muse Watson), for assistance. He is partly successful, with Gibbs remembering working with Franks and learning from him, recalling up to the point that Franks retired after his warnings about an upcoming terrorist attack were ignored, resulting in the Khobar Towers bombing. Franks fills him on what has been happening in the world since 1991, and the shock of learning of the September 11 terrorist attacks causes him to become physically sick.

Abby and McGee's digital reconstruction of the explosion shows that Gibbs could not have survived the explosion if he had been standing at the time since he would have been peppered with shrapnel. This leads them to believe that Gibbs knew that he was set up and had taken cover. They also realize that someone else had posed as Special Agent Abog Galib, who was already dead before the explosion. Ziva's interrogation of the ship's captain reveals that the man Gibbs met with was in fact Pinpin Pula. Pula is now on a supply ship, posing as Galib, and is the radio operator. He is able to intercept any incoming BOLOs, so the warnings don't get through.

Ziva visits Gibbs on his last night in the hospital in desperation to help him remember, grabbing his hand and using it to show him his trademark "head slap".^{[note A]} This, together with her emotionally reminding him that she had killed her own brother to save his life, shocks Gibbs into regaining his memory. They both promptly return to their headquarters, much to the surprise of the team.

In a live video conference, Washington bureaucrats ignore Gibbs' recommendations about using a covert insertion to board the vessel Pinpin Pula is on instead of attempting to openly search it because of a fear of negative publicity. As a Navy frigate attempts to board the freighter to find Pinpin Pula, the terrorist detonates his bomb and destroys the freighter, killing the Navy SEALs who were about to board and the crew of the freighter alongside himself, while the NCIS team watches on a large surveillance screen. Infuriated, Gibbs has a moment of clarity and tells Jenny that he finally understands why Mike Franks resigned. Gibbs resigns from NCIS and hands his badge to Tony, telling him that he is now in charge of the team and is ready for the responsibility. The episode (and season) closes with Gibbs arriving at Franks' house in Mexico.

== Production ==
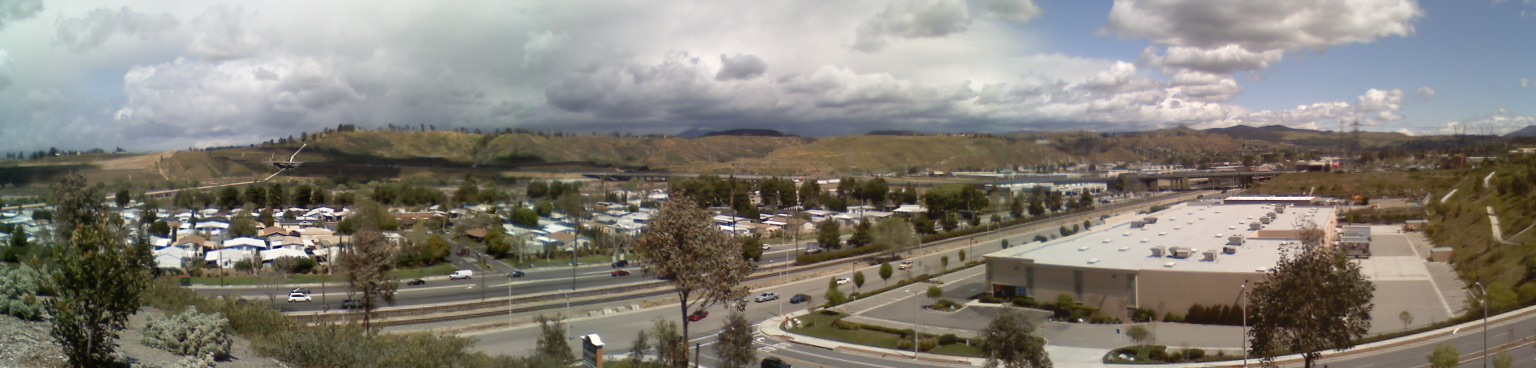
Many of the episodes were filmed in Santa Clarita Valley, California

In March 2006, series creator Donald Bellisario previewed, "At the end of this season, somebody from the main cast is leaving NCIS. It's going to be a good year-ender and a good beginning for next year's story." He further explained, "The season-ender which I'm writing and directing, is going to be very different episode. We're going to learn more about Gibbs and learn more about what I hinted at when I brought Cote on. [We'll learn more] about his first wife, he had a wife and daughter, both were murdered. I'm going to reveal more of that story which nobody in NCIS knows, none of the people who work with him except for Ziva. She's really the only one, we reveal that only she knew about it."

Cote de Pablo, who portrays Ziva, described the impact of the episode on her character and its filming: "Ziva had been keeping a lot of secrets, and in the finale she was struggling. Her NCIS family perceived her to be icy and cold, which she is not. She denied many things to wake up every day and do this job. She denied she killed her brother, and denied she left Israel, her country. And when she revealed it in the final breakdown scene with Gibbs (Mark Harmon), it was like a confrontation with herself, almost like a punch in the belly...I walked on the set, they had re-created a hospital and Gibbs was all dressed up in hospital clothing. I had a regression in which I found myself at 21 walking into a hospital room where my grandmother, Maru, was lying on her deathbed--and it just hit me like a ton of bricks."

"That was so much fun. We just looked at each other and said, 'Let's go for it.' When you are in the moment you don't feel the slap. But afterward, we were both red."

— Cote de Pablo on the "slap scene" in Part I

Mark Harmon commented on the choice to rewrite Gibbs' backstory in the third season, saying, "I kid about it, but for a number of years here, I was playing that Gibbs was married three times, and then all of a sudden I found out that he’d been married four. I mean, that was okay, so you adjust. But I think one of the nice things they do here is challenge the characters. Because a lot of times, individually and as a group, we'll pick up a script and realize that we have read something that we didn't know. It's highly probable that I don't know all the secrets of this character, and that makes him fun to play."

Much of the filming took place in Santa Clarita, California. Melodie Burns, a Santa Clarita resident, later described the site during production of the finale: "Distracted and rushed, I pulled into my usual parking spot at work. Admittedly, I was annoyed to see a man in a bathrobe walking toward me--in Valencia? As he approached, I noticed his face was badly scraped. 'You don't look so good,' I said. 'I'm not having a very good day,' he replied. Running into the building to clock in, I realized there were an unusually greater number of people in the parking lot, and I was taken aback by the new sign, 'HOSPITAL,' that hung over the door. It was only when I reached my co-workers and they excitedly explained Mark Harmon was on-site and bandaged did I realize it was him with whom I had just exchanged greetings!"

Shortly after Part II aired, it was assured that, despite his character quitting NCIS, Harmon was not leaving the show. A CBS representative clarified, "[the finale] was a cliffhanger and people need to tune in next year to see what happens."

== Reception ==
=== Ratings ===
By the third season, NCIS had become "a solid Top 20 hit", and "Hiatus (Part I)" was watched live by 15.17 million viewers in the United States following its broadcast on May 9, 2006. A few days later, it was reported, "While ABC, UPN and NBC have unsuccessfully pitted their own offerings against Fox's 'American Idol,' with show after show cycling through the timeslot, the CBS drama has fared well against the singing contest. It pulls in an average 3.1 adults 18-49 rating, making it No. 2 in its time slot behind 'Idol.'"

On May 16, Part II was seen live by 16.49 million viewers. According to The Futon Critic, "NCIS was second in households (10.5/16), viewers (16.49m), adults 25-54 (5.3/13) and adults 18-49 (3.8/10). NCIS beat NBC and ABC combined in households (vs. 5.7/09, +84%), viewers (vs. 8.37m, +97%), adults 25-54 (vs. 3.4/08, +56%) and adults 18-49 (vs. 2.9/08, +31%)." A rating point represents one percent of the total number of television sets in American households, and a share means the percentage of television sets in use tuned to the program.

=== Critical reviews ===
Bellisario had divulged that a character would be "leaving" in the finale before the episode aired. Ed Robertson of Media Life Magazine speculated that either Tony (Michael Weatherly) or Abby (Pauley Perrette) would depart with the conclusion of Part II, saying, "We assume CBS would never be stupid enough to kill off series star Mark Harmon, who plays hard-nosed Leroy Gibbs, who is already suffering memory loss after a recent explosion." Jae-Ha Kim of Amazon.com later described the events of the finale as "explosive" in her review of the third season.

Michelle Calbert from BuddyTV included the "Hiatus" two-part in her list of "The 10 Best Gibbs Episodes" and wrote, "We're including both episodes as one because they are basically just one two-hour episode. Gibbs is seriously injured in an explosion and the trauma triggers memories we never knew he had. That season we had seen glimpses and hints to what we found out in those two episodes, but it was still shocking to discover that Gibbs had once had a wife and child tragically killed by a drug dealer. Not only that, but that Gibbs had killed said drug dealer as revenge. We learned so much about Gibbs in this episode that I don't think any of us ever looked at him the same way again." Likewise, Julian Spivey from Examiner.com included "Hiatus" in his compile of the "10 greatest episodes of 'NCIS'" in January 2012, saying, "'Hiatus' was the season finale of season three, in which Gibbs has been in a coma after being involved in an explosion. It's a very impressive performance from Harmon, especially as he's forced to remember the deaths of his wife and daughter and has to remember horrible moments in his life, like 9/11. The season culminates with Gibbs realizing that a terrorist is going to blow up a U.S. Naval vessel, but a higher up doesn’t believe him. As the ship blows up, Gibbs quits NCIS and leaves for the beaches of Mexico. 'Hiatus' also marked the debut of NCIS favorite recurring character Mike Franks as Gibbs former boss and closest friend."

== Notes ==
- ^Note A Gibbs slapping members of the team on the back of the head is a trademark feature of the show and is usually done to get the characters' attention.
