= NCIS season 3 =

Season of television series

NCIS
- Season 3
- Season 3 U.S. DVD cover
- Starring: Mark Harmon; Michael Weatherly; Cote de Pablo; Pauley Perrette; Sean Murray; Lauren Holly; David McCallum
- No. of episodes: 24

Release
- Original network: CBS
- Original release: September 20, 2005 – May 16, 2006

Season chronology
- ← Previous; Season 2 Next → Season 4

The third season of the police procedural drama NCIS was originally broadcast between September 20, 2005, and May 16, 2006, on CBS. With the episode " Kill Ari (Part I)", the show also introduced the black and white "freeze-frame" which was shown before the opening sequence, and end credits of each episode and has continued to be used to this day.

The third season opens in the aftermath of "Twilight", with the entire team in shock and Gibbs on a vendetta to seek revenge for Kate's murder. Matters are complicated by the intervention of Gibbs' former lover and new NCIS director Jenny Shepard, and Mossad officer Ziva David. This season begins to drop little hints about Gibbs' past, and is the first to reference his first wife, Shannon, and his daughter, Kelly. The season finale introduces his former boss and mentor, Mike Franks (Muse Watson), who assists Gibbs in recovering from a near-fatal bomb blast. The season ends with Gibbs retiring, leaving DiNozzo in charge of the Major Case Response Team.

== Cast and characters ==
=== Main ===
- Mark Harmon as Leroy Jethro Gibbs, NCIS Supervisory Special Agent (SSA) of the Major Case Response Team (MCRT) assigned to Washington's Navy Yard
- Michael Weatherly as Anthony DiNozzo, NCIS Senior Special Agent, Second in Command of MCRT
- Cote de Pablo as Ziva David, Mossad Liaison Officer to NCIS (guest episodes 1–2, main cast starting episode 4)
- Pauley Perrette as Abby Sciuto, Forensic Specialist for NCIS
- Sean Murray as Timothy McGee, NCIS Probationary Special Agent
- Lauren Holly as Jenny Shepard, new NCIS Director (recurring episodes 1–8, main cast starting episode 9)
- David McCallum as Dr. Donald "Ducky" Mallard, Chief Medical Examiner for NCIS

=== Recurring ===
- Lauren Holly as Jenny Shephard, new NCIS Director
- Alan Dale as Thomas Morrow, departing NCIS Director
- Joe Spano as Tobias Fornell, FBI Senior Special Agent
- Jessica Steen as Paula Cassidy, NCIS Senior Special Agent
- Rudolf Martin as Ari Haswari, rogue Mossad Agent who killed Caitlin Todd
- Brian Dietzen as Jimmy Palmer, Assistant Medical Examiner for NCIS
- Nina Foch as Victoria Mallard, Ducky's mother
- Tamara Taylor as Cassie Yates, NCIS Special Agent
- Kent Shocknek as Guy Ross, ZNN news anchor
- Mary Mouser as Kelly Gibbs, Gibbs' deceased daughter
- Darby Stanchfield as Shannon Gibbs, Gibbs' deceased wife
- Michael Bellisario as Charles Sterling, Abby's lab assistant
- Stephanie Mello as Cynthia Summer, NCIS Secretary to Director Shepard
- Muse Watson as Mike Franks, retired Senior Special Agent for NCIS and Gibbs' former boss, and mentor
- Don Franklin as Ron Sacks, FBI Special Agent

=== Guests ===
- Gloria Votsis as Dana
- Lawrence Monoson as Adam O'Neill
- Chad Donella as John Briggs
- Tom Wright as Warden Sam Kelleher
- Christopher Shyer as Kyle Boone
- Barbara Niven as Dr. Elaine Burns
- Robert Blanche as Brett Willis
- Merritt Wever as Wendy Smith
- Geoffrey Lower as CDR Robert Morris
- Wil Bethel as P.O. John Kirby
- Nat Faxon as Carter Finch
- Marty Papazian as Sgt. Jake Roberts
- Brittney Powell as Jamie Carr
- Mikki Padilla as Leanne Roberts
- Jack Stehlin as Commander Harry Wilder
- Michael Reilly Burke as Frank Connell
- Phillip Rhys as Agent Yussif
- Michelle Krusiec as Agent Maya
- Eric Steinberg as Marcos Siazon
- Matt Malloy as Dr. George Petri
- Lindsay Price as Lt. Pam Kim
- Elizabeth Bennett as Nurse Carla Johnson
- Randy Wayne as Grant Bridges
- David Brant as NCIS Special Agent David Brant
- Christopher Allport as Capt. Dan Karzin
- William Gregory Lee as Sgt. Keith Archer
- John Pleshette as Tom Crawley
- Jeffrey Pierce as Sgt Michael McMannis
- Mini Andén as Hannah Bresling
- Daniel Roebuck as Matthew Lake
- Morocco Omari as Agent Thomas Survoy
- James Martin Kelly as Mookie Perkins
- Phil Morris as Capt. Paul Martino
- P.J. Byrne as Ross Logan
- Eric Lange as William Lafferty
- Jesse Plemons as Jason Geckler
- Zac Efron as Daniel Austin
- Keone Young as Lee Sung
- Esther K. Chae as Yoon Dawson
- Tim Griffin as Sergeant Malcolm Porter
- Chelsea Field as Jocelyn Wayne
- Bruce French as Floyd Vernon
- Ivar Brogger as Simon Katz
- John L. Adams as Seth Patterson
- Evan Helmuth as Jeff Beilsman
- Ellen Hollman as NCIS Special Agent Tina Larsen
- Michelle Harrison as Ranger Bobbi Hendricks
- Chris Payne Gilbert as Wesley Rowan
- Alex Frost as Jerry
- Paul Schulze as Major Ken Meyers
- Michael Welch as Kody Meyers
- Linsey Godfrey as Stephanie Phillips
- Alexandra Krosney as Nadia Harcourt
- Douglas Spain as Cesar Bernal
- Seth Adkins as Sean Hodges
- Matt Iseman as DC Metro Officer Talbot
- Scott Paulin as Captain Kevin Dorn
- Mark Harelik as Ron Levinson
- Kimberlee Peterson as Lt. Keira Napleton
- Adria Dawn as NCIS Tech
- Vincent Young as Mikel Mawher
- Mimi Kuzyk as Ginger Stevenson
- Eddie Jemison as Terry Spooner
- Sondra Currie as Lillian Hencheck
- Ken Lerner as Albert Hencheck
- Richard Keith as Frank Dreyer
- Connor Trinneer as James Dempsey
- Alex Nesic as Alex Rudd
- Tim Russ as Jerry Kemper
- Rodney Scott as Brian Dempsey
- Cotter Smith as Agent Sam Stevens
- Christopher Maher as Capt. Aris Mahir
- Aloma Wright as Nurse Ethel Washington
- Jamison Jones as Lt. Gelfand
- Brett Cullen as Captain Todd Gelfand
- Tyrees Allen as Deputy Director Dean Welsh

== Episodes ==
No. overall	No. in season	Title	Directed by	Written by	Original release date	Prod. code	U.S. viewers (millions)
47	1	"Kill Ari"	Dennis Smith	Donald P. Bellisario	September 20, 2005	302	15.48
48	2	"Kill Ari"	James Whitmore Jr.	Donald P. Bellisario	September 27, 2005	304	15.09
Part I: The team struggles to cope with Agent Todd's death while searching for her killer. Part II: Gibbs' determination to kill Ari in revenge for Kate Todd's death increases after he mounts attacks against various members of the team in his sadistic game with Gibbs.
49	3	"Mind Games"	William Webb	Teleplay by : Jeffrey A. Kirkpatrick & John C. Kelley; Story by : Jeffrey A. Kirkpatrick	October 4, 2005	301	16.87
Death row prisoner Kyle Boone is a serial killer whom Gibbs arrested ten years ago. Having been placed on death row and due to be executed in a few days time for killing several young women, carving a mark on their backs and taking their tongues as his trophies, he insists that he will disclose the location of the missing bodies of his murder victims to Gibbs alone, forcing the reluctant team leader to meet with him due to SECNAV personally ordering him to do so. When Abby and McGee locate the place where the victims had been murdered, the team, assisted by Agent Cassidy, finds that the latest four victims in Boone's scrapbook had been killed in the last three years, meaning Boone has an accomplice who has been carrying on his work. But the investigation turns serious when Agent Cassidy goes missing, having been kidnapped, the team is forced into a desperate race against time to prevent her from becoming victim number five of the copycat killer.
50	4	"Silver War"	Terrence O'Hara	Teleplay by : John C. Kelley; Story by : Joshua Lurie	October 11, 2005	305	16.78
A deceased Marine is found encased in a Civil War—era tomb at the Smithsonian museum and evidence later comes to light suggesting that he was probably buried alive. In the meantime, Ziva David returns to NCIS, having been assigned to Gibbs' team as a liaison officer for Mossad by the new director of NCIS, Jenny Shepard. Gibbs is angry she did so without consulting him, but Jenny insists that the team needs Ziva. She is forced to prove her worth to the team as they track down the people responsible for the staff sergeant's death, which is linked to a Civil War treasure and a lone rogue group who are working behind the scenes. When Ducky and Ziva are placed in a difficult position, Ziva shows her value by saving both their lives and as such, is finally accepted into the team, officially replacing Kate Todd.
51	5	"Switch"	Thomas J. Wright	Gil Grant	October 18, 2005	303	17.69
The team is called to investigate the murder of a petty officer who was gunned down while driving on a freeway. While visiting the sailor's commander to inform him of the death, the team discovers that another man claims to be the petty officer and that his identity may have been stolen. Secrets in both men's lives are revealed, but it is Abby's shrewd observations that end up solving the case. Also, McGee discovers his credit card has been stolen and was used to buy porn videos amongst other items while Ziva must quickly learn to adjust to Gibbs' leadership style.
52	6	"The Voyeur's Web"	Dennis Smith	David J. North	October 25, 2005	306	18.01
Jamie Carr, a Marine sergeant's wife, is thought to have been abducted until Gibbs and his team found evidence to suggest that she may have been murdered live on the internet. Carr and her neighbor, Leanne Roberts, had been making money by running a live internet sex site while their husbands were deployed abroad. Roberts' body is later found but the team is still unable to find any trace of Carr. With the help of her new assistant, Chip Sterling, who Director Shepard has hired for her, Abby determines that the video of Jamie might not be all it seems.
53	7	"Honor Code"	Colin Bucksey	Christopher Silber	November 1, 2005	307	18.08
Gibbs befriends a young boy after his father, a lieutenant commander, is kidnapped. The lieutenant commander had been working on a classified project named Honor and is the only person who knows the code keys to the encryption. The release of the code keys can pose a serious threat to national security. Although the evidence gathered by Gibbs' team suggests that the lieutenant commander was a part of the scheme, Gibbs believes otherwise due to the strong bond between the lieutenant commander and his son. While they solve the case, each of the team members take turns babysitting the boy.
54	8	"Under Covers"	Aaron Lipstadt	L.D. Zlotoff	November 8, 2005	308	17.79
Husband-wife assassins Jean-Paul and Sophie Ranier are fatally wounded in a car crash before their next assignment at the United States Marine Corps birthday ball. Gibbs sends Ziva and Tony to pose as the Raniers to find out who their target is, and who hired them. Gibbs and his team get a surprise when they find out who has been spying on Tony and Ziva. It is eventually revealed that the Raniers are expecting a baby and are planning to retire, and that the assassination plot is actually a set-up by the client to kill the Raniers after obtaining their client list.: Note: The episode is dedicated to Marines everywhere with their motto SEMPER FI
55	9	"Frame Up"	Thomas J. Wright	Laurence Walsh	November 22, 2005	309	16.43
A pair of legs are found on a Marine base, and the team is dumbfounded and shellshocked when every piece of evidence in a murder points towards Tony as the prime suspect. In an effort to help their colleague, the team compiles a list of people who may have grudges against Tony, providing them with a long list of suspects. Abby is upset that she may have incriminated Tony through the forensic evidence she provided and refuses to give up until she's proved his innocence.
56	10	"Probie"	Terrence O'Hara	George Schenck & Frank Cardea	November 29, 2005	310	18.17
While the team is on protective detail for the Chief of Naval Operations, McGee spots an argument taking place in an alleyway. He shoots one of the men, who he believed was aiming a gun at him. The deceased turns out to be a D.C. Metro police detective who was working undercover. When the team is unable to find any weapon or bullets left behind by anyone other than McGee, it appears that McGee may have made a probie mistake. McGee begins to doubt himself but Gibbs is suspicious of the detective's meeting, which took place that night. After speaking to the decedent's partner, the team realizes that McGee's story may be more accurate than any of them thought.
57	11	"Model Behavior"	Stephen Cragg	David J. North	December 13, 2005	311	17.11
A supermodel is found dead after having overdosed on phencyclidine at a Marine base, where the reality TV show in which she was participating was being filmed. Her ex-boyfriend is also found dead in a motel nearby having overdosed on heroin, leading the team to believe that their deaths may have been related to their relationship. However, when it is discovered that the Marine drill instructor in charge of the TV show was romantically linked to the dead supermodel, the team look closer at the others involved in the show. When the Marine boyfriend begins to overdose on the same thing that killed his girlfriend, it appears that someone may have disapproved of the relationship, even going to extreme lengths to end it.
58	12	"Boxed In"	Dennis Smith	Dana Coen	January 10, 2006	313	17.19
While investigating a naval stockyard for a container with illegal weapons, Tony and Ziva are ambushed and forced to take cover in a container, where they subsequently become locked in. Gibbs, McGee, and Abby attempt to search for them with the help of the port security office. Meanwhile, Tony and Ziva discover that the crates of DVD movies inside the container served as a cover for hidden crates, which contain millions of dollars of counterfeit money. But they both find themselves in a gunfight after the container is later taken away to a warehouse guarded by terrorists, forcing Gibbs and McGee into a race against time to find their location before Tony and Ziva end up dead.
59	13	"Deception"	Leslie Libman	Jack Bernstein	January 17, 2006	312	17.74
A Navy lieutenant commander, who was in charge of a shipment of nuclear weapons, is thought to have been abducted leading to Gibbs and his team being called in on a Sunday to investigate. The team discovers that the lieutenant commander had had a meeting earlier in the day at a shopping center and that she did volunteer work at an organization dedicated to combating online pedophilia, meaning that her abductor might not have been a terrorist but a pedophile she was tracking.
60	14	"Light Sleeper"	Colin Bucksey	Christopher Silber	January 24, 2006	314	16.97
Two Marine wives, both originally from Korea, are found gunned down in a house. As NCIS searches for the killer, they discover that the one remaining woman and the two victims are part of a sleeper cell with links to North Korea.
61	15	"Head Case"	Dennis Smith	George Schenck & Frank Cardea	February 7, 2006	315	16.05
While arresting a group of Navy sailors who were operating an illegal automotive chop shop, Ziva finds a severed head in the trunk of a recently stolen car. Abby later matches the head to a Navy captain who died four months previously. Things go from bad to worse when Abby discovers that the ashes that the captain's wife and young daughter have been looking after since his death are bogus, sending the team on the hunt for a possible "human chop shop" operating illegally and the captain's remaining body parts.
62	16	"Family Secret"	James Whitmore Jr.	Steven D. Binder	February 28, 2006	316	15.14
An ambulance carrying the body of a young Marine who died suddenly explodes without warning, destroying the body and also rendering it unrecognizable. But things take a strange turn when Ducky later discovers that the DNA lifted from the body does not match that of the dead Marine.
63	17	"Ravenous"	Thomas J. Wright	Richard C. Arthur	March 7, 2006	317	17.21
A Navy petty officer is found eaten by a bear after a group of teenagers found his dog tags in bear feces in a national forest. However, an autopsy reveals that the petty officer was killed by a blade to the chest before his corpse was eaten. Evidence also shows that he was camping with a woman, who is now missing. Things then take an even more horrifying turn when the team discover that all the accidental deaths might not even be natural or accidental at all, leading Gibbs to suspect that there's a serial killer on the loose in the park, one who's using the deaths to cover up something much worse: murder.
64	18	"Bait"	Terrence O'Hara	Laurence Walsh	March 14, 2006	318	17.55
The teenage son of a Marine major arrives in school with a bomb strapped to his body and takes his classroom hostage. Gibbs enters the classroom as the negotiator and is taken hostage too, leaving Tony in charge much to the chagrin of Director Shepard. The teenager has one demand: bring his mother to the classroom before sunset. The team soon discover that she's dead, having seemingly drowned in a boating accident a year ago. Tony and the rest of the team are put to the test as they try to get everyone out alive while secretly communicating with Gibbs.
65	19	"Iced"	Dennis Smith	Dana Coen	April 4, 2006	319	15.52
While exploring a frozen pond, two young boys discover the body of a Marine in the pond. When Gibbs and the team are dispatched to the scene to investigate, they find three more bodies who are high-ranking members of a notorious Central American street gang, "La Vida Mala" or LVM for short. The team must find out who's responsible for the killings while enduring heat from the deceased Marine's unit who are being held in Iraq until the case is closed, fearing the other Marines might seek retribution. Abby and McGee find a trail of text messages that reveal a shocking truth while Ziva, McGee, and Tony take turns interrogating their main suspect.
66	20	"Untouchable"	Leslie Libman	George Schenck & Frank Cardea	April 18, 2006	320	15.90
A Navy lieutenant working at the Pentagon's cryptography department is found dead in her home, having seemingly committed suicide by shooting herself in the head. However, Abby later discovers that there was someone else with the lieutenant when she died and, as such, the team attempt to find her killer while also searching for the mole. When evidence links the lieutenant to Venezuelan diplomat Simon Roca, the team must find a way around the red tape in order to find out what really happened. While they race against time to tie Roca to the lieutenant, Ducky is held up by his mother, who is suffering from dementia.
67	21	"Bloodbath"	Dennis Smith	Steven D. Binder	April 25, 2006	321	15.56
A couple checking in at a motel near Little Creek Naval Base find their room covered with bloodstains and slices of human tissue in what appears to be a drug deal gone horribly wrong. The team realizes that they have been set up after Tony notices discrepancies in the bloodstains, Ducky identifies the slices as discarded tissue from surgical procedures and Abby and McGee barely escape being poisoned after she realizes the drugs she was testing were rigged. They must dig into Abby's past to find out who wants her dead and their search leads them to the main suspect in the embezzlement trial Abby is testifying in, the suspect's lawyer, and Abby's ex-boyfriend whose obsession with Abby is a grave cause for concern.
68	22	"Jeopardy"	James Whitmore Jr.	David J. North	May 2, 2006	322	14.95
A routine drug bust goes wrong when the suspect dies while in Ziva's custody. The victim's brother then takes Director Shepard hostage, demanding that his brother and the drugs be returned to him in exchange for her. With a deadline of just two hours and the clock racing against them, the team, with the help of Cassie Yates (Tamara Taylor), must find the Director before it's too late.
69	23	"Hiatus"	Dennis Smith	Donald P. Bellisario	May 9, 2006	323	15.71
70	24	"Hiatus"	Dennis Smith	Donald P. Bellisario	May 16, 2006	324	16.49
Part I: A bomb explodes as Gibbs contacts an undercover government agent on a suspicious foreign ship, killing the agent and placing Gibbs in a coma, in which he has flashbacks of the murder of his wife Shannon and daughter Kelly many years earlier and of his wounding in Desert Storm. Meanwhile, Tony becomes the temporary head of the investigation team as the group attempts to track down Pinpin Pula, a missing crew member of the ship suspected to be an Abu Sayyaf member. The episode ends with Gibbs awakening from his coma with no memory of Ducky, who is in the room with him. Part II: Gibbs wakes up believing it's 1991 and he was recently wounded in Kuwait, with no memory of the last fifteen years. Director Shepard contacts Gibbs' NCIS mentor and partner, Mike Franks, in hopes of helping an amnesiac Gibbs regain his memory. Only Gibbs knows the details of an impending terrorist attack, and he remembers up until 1996 when Franks retired after his warnings about the impending attack on the Khobar Towers were ignored. She also delves into Gibbs' past and shares information with Ducky about his murdered wife and daughter. The team discovers that the agent was dead before the bomb and realizes that Pinpin Pula killed and impersonated the agent and then used his credentials to board another ship. Meanwhile, Tony and the team discover that Pinpin Pula wants to blow up the ship Cape Fear. Ziva, who had appeared nonchalant about Gibbs' situation, visits Gibbs in a desperate and emotional attempt to revive his memory by telling him about their shared connection with Ari. Gibbs recovers his memory and is taken back to NCIS headquarters. The director in charge of the frigate's shipment refuses to heed warnings from Gibbs, Jenny, and other Navy officers, leading to disastrous consequences. Finally, Gibbs hands his badge to Tony and resigns before heading to Mexico to stay at Franks' house.

== DVD special features ==
NCIS: Naval Criminal Investigative Services- The Complete Third Season
Set details		Special features
24 Episodes; 6-Disc Set ( 7-Disc Set on Region 2 ); English (Dolby Digital 5.1 Surround); Audio Commentaries ( Region 1 only )		The Real N.C.I.S. Declassified; Hit the Head Montage; The Women of N.C.I.S.; N.C.I.S. Season of Change; The Round Table
Release dates
Region 1	Region 2	Region 4
April 24, 2007	June 18, 2007	March 15, 2007
