= Kill Ari =

- NCIS episodes
- Tony and Ziva's first meeting, set shortly after she arrives at NCIS headquarters
- Episode nos.: Season 3 Episodes 1 and 2
- Directed by: Dennis Smith (Part I); James Whitmore, Jr. (Part II)
- Written by: Donald P. Bellisario
- Original air dates: September 20, 2005 (Part I); September 27, 2005 (Part II)

Guest appearances
- Sasha Alexander as Special Agent Kate Todd (special guest star); Lauren Holly as NCIS Director Jenny Shepard; Cote de Pablo as Mossad Agent Ziva David; Pancho Demmings as Gerald Jackson; Rudolf Martin as Ari Haswari; Alan Dale as NCIS Director Tom Morrow (Part I only); Sasha Maxime as Virginia State Police Officer (Part I only); AJ Tannen as Mossad Agent (Part I only); Joe Spano as Senior FBI Agent Tobias C. Fornell (Part II only); Gloria Votsis as Dana (Part II only)

Episode chronology
← Previous "Twilight"	Next → "Mind Games"
- NCIS season 3

"Kill Ari (Part I)" and "Kill Ari (Part II)" are the first two episodes of the third season of the American police procedural drama NCIS, and the 47th and 48th episodes overall. They originally aired on CBS in the United States on September 20 and 27, 2005. Both episodes are written by Donald Bellisario, the show's creator and executive producer at the time. Part I, directed by Dennis Smith, was seen live by 15.48 million viewers, while Part II, directed by James Whitmore, Jr., was seen live by 15.09 million viewers.

The "Kill Ari" story arc centers on Gibbs' hunt for Ari Haswari, who shot and killed Special Agent Kate Todd in the second-season finale of NCIS. It also introduces two new main characters to the show—Mossad Officer Ziva David and NCIS Director Jenny Shepard. Due to these changes in the cast, Bellisario labeled the third season as "the season of change". Despite her character being killed off in the previous episode Sasha Alexander returns but as a special guest star.

== Plot ==
=== Part I ===
The episode opens with a recap of the second season's finale, "Twilight": as the NCIS team by Leroy Jethro Gibbs (Mark Harmon) engage in a gunfight against Ari Haswari's terrorist cell, Ari (Rudolf Martin), identified as a rogue terrorist, attempts to kill various NCIS agents including Tim McGee (Sean Murray) before Ari decides to fatally shoot NCIS Agent Kate Todd (Sasha Alexander) with a long range sniper shot, killing her instantly with a horrified Gibbs and Tony DiNozzo (Michael Weatherly) witnessing Kate's death. In the aftermath of the murder, the team struggles to come to terms with her death while an enraged Gibbs seeks revenge against Ari. Shortly afterwards, Ari attacks again, firing at Abby in her lab. However, she survives physically unharmed.

NCIS Director Tom Morrow (Alan Dale) announces that he is leaving the agency after receiving a job offer from Homeland Security and introduces Jenny Shepard (Lauren Holly) as his replacement. It immediately becomes apparent that Gibbs was romantically involved with Shepard while working undercover with her years earlier, though she insists that she is now nothing more than his boss and will act accordingly. Gibbs clashes with Shepard, who believes that Ari Haswari was not the one responsible for firing the bullet that killed Agent Todd due to the fact that there's no physical evidence or proof of any kind linking him to the crime.

Ziva David (Cote de Pablo), Ari's Mossad control officer, arrives shortly afterwards, striking up a rapport with Tony. She sides with the director and further weakens Gibbs' case, claiming that Ari is completely innocent and offering evidence to support her assertion. However, Ziva's motives for defending Ari become ambiguous when she communicates with him without informing anyone in the NCIS office and her conversation indicates a personal connection to him.

Gibbs realizes that Ziva has contacted Ari and orders Tony to tail her. Ari later returns, taking Gerald Jackson (Pancho Demmings) hostage, though he quickly notifies Ducky to divert the team's attention away from Ziva and force Ducky into a meet.

The episode ends with Ducky approaching the pre-arranged meeting point, unaware that Ari has a sniper-rifle trained on him.

=== Part II ===
Gibbs' determination to kill Ari in revenge for Kate Todd's death increases despite the skepticism expressed by his superiors. Ducky, who is released unharmed shortly after his abduction, admits to Gibbs that he has begun to believe Ari's claims of innocence after listening to his defense, leaving Gibbs further enraged.

After tailing Ari's control officer, Ziva David, for much of the evening, Tony reports to Gibbs that she is communicating with Ari and smuggling a passport and money to him through an unknown woman (Gloria Votsis), presumably another Mossad officer. However, Ziva later approaches Tony and informs him that she was aware that he was following her the entire time. She also tells him that her younger sister Tali, who was "sixteen and the best of us", was killed in a Hamas suicide bombing, and that she knows what it is like to want to seek revenge.

Ari's guilt is further called into question when another suspect appears, though Gibbs insists that it is a cover-up. The latter deduces that Ari is aware of the deaths of his first wife and daughter, as confirmed by Ziva, and that as a result he is targeting Gibbs' female coworkers.

Ziva begins to doubt Ari's innocence and agrees with Gibbs' plan to present Ari with the opportunity to kill him. Gibbs arrives at his house and to his surprise, Ari has been waiting for him, with Gibbs' rifle, planning to kill him before seemingly disguising the death as a suicide. The two briefly converse, with Ari confessing to the killing and claiming that he had terrorized the team because Gibbs reminded him of his father, whom he hated.

Just before Ari can kill Gibbs, Ziva, who had been at the top of the stairs listening to the two men talk, shoots Ari in the forehead, killing him instantly. It is only after the encounter between the three of them that Gibbs discovers why Ziva was so quick to defend Ari: she and Ari share the same father, Deputy Director Eli David of Mossad, making Ari Ziva's half-brother.

In the closing scenes, Gibbs manages to get to Kate's hometown of Indianapolis for her funeral, joining the rest of the NCIS team. It's also revealed that Ziva is escorting Ari's remains back to Tel Aviv. Kate is finally laid to rest with civilian honors along with a Presidential Medal of Freedom that former NCIS Director Tom Morrow (Alan Dale) approved at Gibbs' request. Each of Kate's co-workers leaves a rose on the coffin while remembering their time with her, with Gibbs imagining Kate telling him that he's late for her funeral.

A while later, the team leaves the graveyard with the song "The Viper" in the background, Abby having prepared to "second line" as at a jazz funeral. As they walk alongside each other, Gibbs finally smiles, happy that Kate's death has been avenged.

== Long-term impact ==
Ari Haswari was a recurring character, having first appeared in the Season 1 episode "Bete Noir" as an unknown terrorist who held Ducky, Kate, and Gerald Jackson hostage. It is later revealed that he is the child of an Arab mother and Jewish father, initially a Mossad agent sent undercover in Hamas, who later went rogue and became a terrorist, attacking both Israel and the United States. He is often referred to by commentators as a "half Israeli and half Palestinian and a totally crazed terrorist".

Ziva is first introduced in "Kill Ari (Part I)" and becomes the first and only full-time Israeli character on American primetime television. She is the half-sister of the show's primary antagonist at the time, having same father as Ari. She is a distinctly more sympathetic figure, initially defending Ari and believing him to have been completely innocent of the accusations. Israelis in general are depicted in a positive light, though Ziva's father Eli David is portrayed ambiguously, and Gibbs briefly mentions the Lillehammer affair, in which a Moroccan waiter was killed after being misidentified as a perpetrator of the 1972 massacre of Israeli athletes in Munich, Germany, in Part I.

Ziva's choice to kill her half-brother after realizing that he was guilty of the murder in order to save Gibbs, who was, at the time, essentially a stranger to her, is often regarded as a "selfless, endearing act" and defining character moment. On screen, it served as the foundation for Ziva's relationship with Gibbs and was a recurring subject in later episodes. In the third season's finale, after Gibbs suffered amnesia in the aftermath of a bombing, she was able to help him recover his memory by reminding him of their connection through Ari after several other characters had made attempts and failed. In the sixth-season finale, NCIS Director Vance causes Gibbs to doubt Ziva's motives for killing her brother: he claims Ziva was ordered by her father Eli to kill Ari (who was a rogue operative) in order to gain Gibbs' trust, thus leading him to question the nature of their connection. This concern is later resolved early in the seventh season when Ziva assures Gibbs that the sole purpose of her choice was to save his life. Ari is also mentioned in passing in various other episodes, including "Silver War", "Probie", "Shalom", "Cloak", "Enemies Foreign", "A Man Walks Into a Bar...", "Safe Harbor", and "Past, Present, and Future".

== Production ==
The episodes were written to show the NCIS characters grieving and dealing with Todd's death, as well as to provide closure for Ari's storyline.

Bellisario discussed the episode's impact and construction in the third season's commentary: "This show was really a seminal show in some ways for the changes that came about in NCIS. We killed off Kate. We had to have Gibbs deal with that, and what we saw was a different Gibbs than we'd seen for two years. That was followed by a new director coming in, played by Lauren Holly. And we also introduced in this episode a new character, Ziva David, the Mossad officer, who was an exchange officer to NCIS, taking the place of Kate. So, a lot of new people, and a new look at the show." He added, "People said to me, how are you going to get humor, which is a hallmark of our show, into an episode where Kate's been killed and everyone is mourning her? You'll see how we were able to do that."

On cinematography, he said, "Our flashbacks, we're trying new things here...New flashbacks style started this season...I started to do flashes at the beginning of acts that give away the end of the act or at least give you a clue as to what's coming at the end of that act. It may mean nothing to you when you first see it, but by the end of the act it will." He remarked in an October 2005 interview that filming them "in grainy 16-millimeter black and white" was also a new feature added in the third season.

== Casting ==
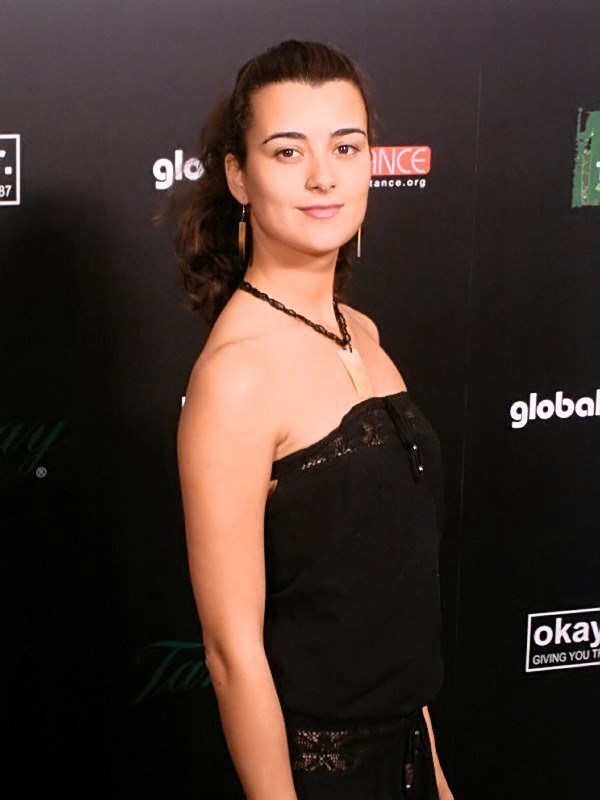
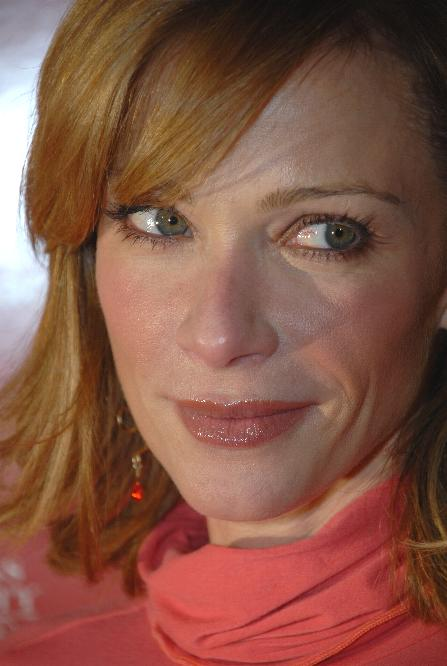
Cote de Pablo (Ziva David, left) and Lauren Holly (Jenny Shepard, right) both first appeared in "Kill Ari (Part I)" and became series regulars afterwards

Sasha Alexander's character Caitlin "Kate" Todd was killed off in the second-season finale following Alexander's decision to permanently exit the role, and shortly afterwards Bellisario announced plans to replace her with another female lead, originally described as "a European or Australian girl who is very comfortable with her femininity and sexuality." He later elaborated, "The last thing I want to do is go back to the same character...I want to bring in (a new character) who is working for Interpol or the Royal Australian Navy, someone foreign who brings a whole new attitude. Kate was kind of uptight, and I want to bring in somebody who doesn't live by the three-button rule for women in business."

Over 50 actresses reportedly auditioned for the role, and Cote de Pablo, who was ultimately cast, auditioned using a Czech accent. The character was later revised as Israeli and the half-sister of Haswari.

Mark Harmon had expressed apprehension at replacing a central character in the third season, saying, "Chemistry is a big intangible in television. We made some headway over the past two years, and the fact we were replacing a major character made us all a little concerned." Co-executive producer Charles Floyd Johnson, likewise, noted that the audience would be wary of Alexander's replacement. However, after meeting de Pablo, Harmon said that she fit in well with the cast and brightened the set's environment, adding, "Before I ever knew her, I remember seeing her in the squad room set, and I watched her walk from Point A to Point B after a shot. I watched her tousle the head of the dolly grip and hug the director of photography and continue right on. It's just what she does, who she is. Cote did nothing other than what she'd do every day."

Lauren Holly was cast to portray Jenny Shepard, Gibbs' former lover and the new director of NCIS. Holly, who had originally auditioned for the role of Kate Todd a few years earlier, described the process of becoming a permanent fixture on the show: "I was living in a Chicago suburb raising my three boys when I got the call about being on the show. It was a guest-starring arc that would be about six episodes. The role was of the new Director of the agency, and things were made complicated because she had a 'past' with the lead agent, Jethro, played by Mark Harmon...So I get the call, followed by a couple of DVDs. I was mildly intrigued. On the positive side – I was beginning to miss working, I knew Mark, and working for Don had to be an experience. On the other hand, it was just another procedural, and tied to Don’s most recent show, ‘JAG’- a show that had never interested me. So I watched the DVDs and found that I REALLY enjoyed the supporting characters. Maybe Don would give me that sort of material...I was happy to be a minor character because that meant I could be with [my family] more. When they asked me back for the second season, the decision was made to move my family back to California with me."

Bellisario stated of Holly's depiction, "Over the first season here, she had to learn to play strong and tough because...she's used to playing a soft, pretty girl." This was the last NCIS episode to feature Gerald, Ducky's former assistant.

== Reception ==
"Kill Ari (Part I)" was watched live by 15.48 million viewers in the United States following its broadcast on September 20, 2005, with a 9.7/15 share among all households, and a 3.8/11 share among adults aged 18 to 49. Compared to the previous episode, "Twilight", it was up by 0.74 million viewers. A week later, Part II was watched live by 15.09 million viewers. A rating point represents one percent of the total number of television sets in American households, and a share means the percentage of television sets in use tuned to the program.

Reviews were generally positive, and critics often cite "Kill Ari" as one of the program's best long-term arcs. David Dewitt from Helium.com described "Kill Ari" as "the best episode of the season". Kim Shindle from The Patriot-News listed the storyline surrounding Ari as one of several examples of good extended plots. Another critic wrote, "The grief and guilt of the surviving members of the team are keenly felt, as is their need for justice, and revenge. The scenes where Todd appears to each member of the team are moving and bitter sweet, the image each of them sees a projection of their own emotions." The same reviewer also criticized one aspect: "Shepard and Gibbs had a relationship some years before, and the blurry flashbacks to their time undercover are the episode's weakest point."

June Thomas of Slate magazine refers to Ziva's killing of Ari as an example when describing the NCIS characters as "men and women of honor, heroes who have all made significant sacrifices for their country."

Julian Spivey from Examiner.com included "Kill Ari" in his compile of the "10 greatest episodes of 'NCIS'" in January 2012, saying, "Terrorist Ari Haswari (played by Rudolf Martin) was the first big baddie on NCIS and to this day the most memorable, horrifying and greatest bad guy the series has seen. He was so great that he appeared over three different seasons of the show and his battles with Gibbs are epic. At the end of season two Ari killed one of Gibbs' team members in Kate Todd (played by Sasha Alexander), so you just knew that Gibbs would stop at nothing to kill Ari, as the two-part episode title implies. In the end, Gibbs gets his revenge, but surprisingly is not the one to pull the trigger. That deed was done by Ari's own sister and new NCIS cast member Cote de Pablo as Mossad agent Ziva David." Michelle Calbert of BuddyTV named listed "Kill Ari" among "The 10 Best Episodes of the First 10 Seasons" and "The 10 Best 'Tiva' Episodes" in 2013, after the show had been on for ten years, and wrote, "No list of Tiva episodes can be complete without the two that brought these two characters together in the first place. Once Ziva walked into the squad room, she and Tony started a flirtation that lasted ten seasons and resulted in a child being born between the two being revealed at the end of season 13."
