= Ziva David =

Fictional character

Ziva David זיוה דוד
- NCIS character
- Ziva David in the Season 3 episode, "Silver War".
- First appearance: "Kill Ari (Part I)" (3.01); September 20, 2005
- Created by: Donald P. Bellisario
- Portrayed by: Cote de Pablo; Gabi Coccio (teenage Ziva; flashbacks only)
- Voiced by: Erin Bennett (NCIS: The Video Game)

In-universe information
- Gender: Female
- Occupation: NCIS Special Agent; Mossad Liaison Officer; Mossad operative, control officer Soldier in the Israeli Army
- Family: Eli David (father, deceased); Rivka David (mother, deceased); Ari Haswari (paternal half brother, deceased); Tali David (sister, deceased)
- Significant other: Anthony DiNozzo
- Children: Tali (daughter; with Anthony DiNozzo)
- Religion: Jewish
- Nationality: Israeli American

Career at NCIS
- Position: Special Agent (seasons 7–11); Mossad Liaison Officer (seasons 3–7)
- Rank: Junior field agent Probationary field agent season 7
- Years of Service: c. 2005–2013

Ziva David (/ˈziːvə dəˈviːd/; Hebrew: זיוה דוד, pronounced [ˈziva daˈvid], feminine form of Ziv: "Radiance"; birth date November 12, 1982, Beersheba in the Negev desert of southern Israel) is a fictional character from the CBS television series NCIS, portrayed by actress Cote de Pablo. Ziva first appeared in the season 3 premiere episode, "Kill Ari (Part 1)", and became a regular cast member from the episode "Silver War". She replaced Caitlin "Kate" Todd (Sasha Alexander), who was killed at the hands of Ziva's half-brother, Ari Haswari (Rudolf Martin), in the season 2 finale. Following the onscreen death of the character's father in season 10, Gabi Coccio recurrently portrayed a young Ziva in flashbacks.

Ziva is introduced to the show as an Israeli citizen, an agent of the Kidon unit of the Mossad, a daughter of Mossad Director Eli David, and a friend of NCIS Director Jenny Shepard. She was assigned to NCIS as a liaison officer in an arrangement between Eli and Jenny, a position she held for four years until she returned to Mossad in the season 6 finale, "Aliyah". After being captured by terrorists in Somalia while on assignment for Mossad and presumed dead, she was eventually saved by Gibbs, Tony, and McGee, who brought her back to America. These events led to her resigning from Mossad, applying to become an NCIS agent, and being sworn in as a U.S. citizen.

On July 10, 2013, CBS Television Studios announced that Cote de Pablo would be leaving NCIS during season 11. That fall, De Pablo appeared in two episodes as a series regular to wrap up her character's storyline. In season 13, Ziva was apparently killed off screen, though executive producer and show runner Gary Glasberg suggested that she might still be alive. In season 16, Ziva was confirmed to still be alive, and De Pablo returned in season 17 as a guest star for several episodes.

Outside of fiction, the cultural impact of Ziva became a subject of discussion among various critics, with academics and rabbis weighing in on the matter. Newspapers such as The Jerusalem Post cited her as the only full-time Israeli character on an American mainstream network television show, and Harvard preceptor Eitan Kensky identified her as the "most prominent televisual Israeli" in the United States. Her depiction was generally praised for exposing the Western public to Israeli society and culture, its positive portrayal of an Israeli, and its "cheerleading for American ties to Israel". The role made de Pablo the second most popular actress on U.S. primetime television in 2013, according to Q Score, and a 2013 study by E-Poll Market Research listed her among the top 10 most appealing celebrities in America.

== Character creation and casting ==
Sasha Alexander's character Kate Todd was killed in the second NCIS season finale following Alexander's decision to permanently leave the show. Shortly afterwards, series creator Donald Bellisario announced plans to replace Todd with another female lead. At the time, he stated that the new character would be "quite different" from the previous and of an undecided foreign nationality—"I want to go for a European or Australian girl who is very comfortable with her femininity and sexuality."

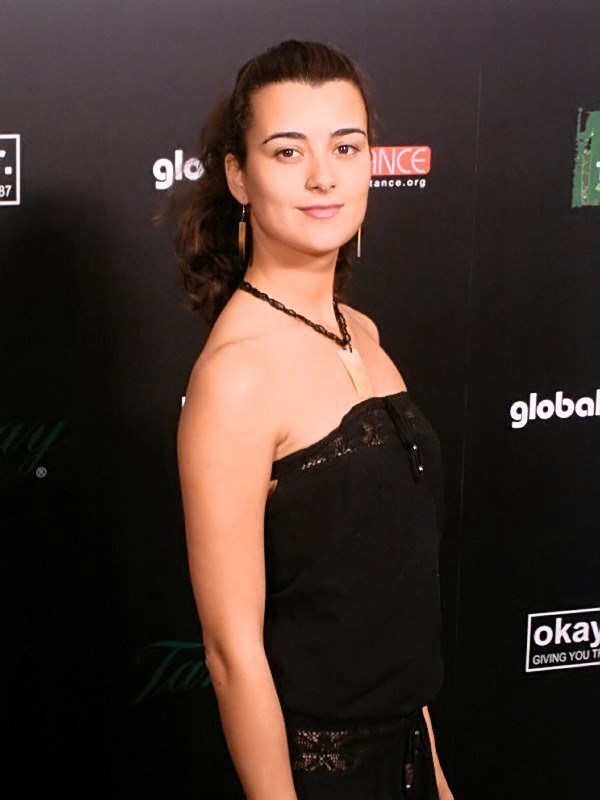
Cote de Pablo, 2007

Before joining the cast of NCIS, Cote de Pablo, who lived in New York at the time, had performed primarily in the theatre. She was intended to portray one of the lead female roles in a 2005 Broadway musical version of The Mambo Kings and had turned down other television roles to stay with it. However, the production was cancelled in June after a trial engagement in San Francisco and two days later de Pablo was asked to audition for a role on NCIS.

De Pablo later said that the character was simply described as a generic eastern European woman and that she had used a Czech accent when auditioning. Over 50 actresses reportedly auditioned for the role, and another actress with a longer résumé had initially been the frontrunner. During a screen test, de Pablo and other actresses were paired with Michael Weatherly, who went offscript by brushing her hair back and commenting, "You remind me of Salma Hayek." De Pablo described her response as follows: "I dismissed him completely. My primary thought was, 'Don't let this guy get physically close to you.' And, at that moment, everybody in the room started laughing and thought it was the funniest thing in the world because the chemistry between the two characters was perfect." Co-executive producer Charles Floyd Johnson remarked that de Pablo won the role of Ziva for her reaction to Weatherly's departure from the script, saying, "When you get actors who really listen and respond organically in the moment to what they're hearing, sometimes magic happens. They really seemed to get that immediately, and that doesn't always happen."

The character's nationality was changed to Israeli after de Pablo was cast. She was also rewritten as a Mossad agent and Ari Haswari's half-sister, with creators originally planning for her to be Interpol or Royal Australian Navy. De Pablo later added, "I was one of the last to audition, and I don't think they had a clear idea of what they wanted. So I interpreted Ziva as a cool, competent woman, not the usual Hollywood sex symbol with big boobs, but [someone] who was comfortable in her own sexuality and used to working with men on an equal footing. It helped that by my looks, I could be taken for almost any nationality." She has also said that Ziva is based on an Israeli woman that she had known prior to joining the series.

Producers cast child actress Gabi Coccio, then aged 13, to portray a young Ziva for a flashback in the tenth season episode "Shiva" in 2013. According to Coccio's father, this was "her first national appearance and first on a show like this". She reprised the role later that season in "Berlin", this time appearing in several flashbacks. During the show's summer hiatus, she confirmed via Twitter that she would appear again in the eleventh season.

== Biography ==
=== Childhood and early years in Mossad ===
Young Ziva (Gabi Coccio) saying the Shabbat blessing in "Shiva"

Born in Be'er Sheva, Israel on November 12, 1982, Ziva is one of three children fathered by the fictional Mossad Director Eli David, the other two being Ari, an older half brother, and Tali, a younger sister who was killed in a Hamas suicide bombing at the age of 16. Her mother, Rivka (Weronika Rosati), is infrequently mentioned throughout the series; she is referred to as having taught Ziva how to drive and preferring that she play with dolls instead of "boy games" like Battleship and G.I. Joe. By 1991, Rivka took her children and left Eli because she could no longer tolerate the nature of his work. They apparently attempted to reconcile at some point, though, according to Ziva, they divorced when she was 13 due to Eli's indiscretions with a female Mossad operative. In the Season 9 episode "Safe Harbor", it is confirmed that she is deceased, having been "killed" prior to the beginning of the series.

As a child, Ziva took ballet, though her father never came to any of her performances. At some point, he also taught her how to play baseball. Since her early childhood, Eli trained her in combat tactics and espionage (according to Ziva, one of her earliest memories of childhood was her father leading her and her sister into a forest, blindfolded, then leaving them there to find their way out again). She commented in "Tribes" that her childhood best friend, a Muslim, was killed in a retaliatory Israeli air-strike when she was twelve. She explains her upbringing to Tony: "You and I come from two totally different places. In my world, you grow up fast. You have no choice."

Directly after high school, Ziva served a mandatory period of two years in the Israel Defense Forces. Contrary to speculation, she claims she volunteered to join Mossad as soon as she was eligible, and was not motivated by the desire to avenge the death of her sister. During her time at Mossad, Ziva was part of a special operations unit known as Kidon, which is part of the Metsada (which is now code named Komemiute). This unit specialized in assassinations, paramilitary operations, sabotage, and psychological warfare. Her position was control officer. As a result of early, intensive training, she is very skilled in hand-to-hand combat and shooting, later attempting to teach a class on knife throwing at NCIS.

Ziva is scripted as someone who "has had to do awful things and watch awful things in her life"; she has "seen 12-year-old suicide bombers in Israel" and gone hungry long enough to resort to eating maggots. In the third season, she recounts an incident in which one of her friends from Mossad had been beheaded after infiltrating a Hamas cell in Ramallah; Hamas terrorists sent his head back on the overnight express, leading her to view captivity as worse than death. Ducky later told Gibbs that, "Agent David has been through things you and I can't even imagine" and suggested that she was the only one who could relate to a suspect who had been abused.

Ziva has been involved in operations in Cairo, Egypt (where she met Jenny Shepard, who later became Director of NCIS), in Iraq before its occupation, in Paris where she worked with partner Namir Eschel, and in Eastern Europe alongside Jenny Shepard, which was followed by six months in the United Kingdom on counter-terrorist operations directly prior to working with NCIS. According to Jenny, Ziva saved her life in Cairo two years prior to Ziva's first appearance in the series.

=== NCIS ===
Officer Ziva David first appears in the third season, having been sent to NCIS following the murder of Special Agent Todd by Ari Haswari. She is Ari's control officer and half-sister due to the fact that they shared the same father, Mossad's then Deputy Director, Eli David (Michael Nouri). Eli is later described as Director of Mossad.

During the episode "Kill Ari (Part 2)", NCIS Special Agent Gibbs finds himself cornered by an armed Ari, but Ziva emerges at the last minute and kills Ari with a single gunshot wound to the forehead, similarly to the way Ari had shot Agent Kate Todd in the season 2 finale, "Twilight". After Ari's death, she asks to be assigned as a liaison for Mossad at NCIS, where she subsequently joins Special Agent Gibbs' team in the episode "Silver War", permanently replacing the deceased Agent Todd.

Her early storylines center on her integration and attempts to be accepted by the other characters. Due to her relation to Ari, Ziva's appearance and eventual assignment to Gibbs' team draws fierce resentment from team member Anthony DiNozzo, forensic specialist Abby Sciuto, and even Gibbs himself when he learns that Director Shepard had assigned Ziva to his team without his knowledge. She later proves her worth in the same episode by using her training to save herself and Dr. Donald "Ducky" Mallard from Dr. Burns, a rogue member of the Smithsonian Anthropology Lab. This in turn causes the team to develop a newfound respect for her and sets the foundation for Ziva's strong friendship with Ducky.

In "Shalom", the fourth season premiere, she is framed by Iranian agents for the murder of two FBI officers and a suspect in their custody who was wanted for crimes against Israel. Accused of being a double agent, she becomes a fugitive and is forced to ask for help from Gibbs, who had retired from NCIS at the end of season 3 and is living in Mexico. They ultimately prove her innocence, which prompts Gibbs to return to NCIS.

According to one critic, "the first time we really see Ziva's soft side is during season 4", when she develops a short but intense friendship with Lt. Roy Sanders (Matthew Marsden), who had been intentionally exposed to radiation by a coworker, in "Dead Man Walking". Ziva knew him from her daily run, during which they always passed by each other running in opposite directions. This elicits concern from Tony and others when it becomes clear that she is "falling in love with a dying man". Roy later asks if she would have noticed him if he had just stopped running, expressing regret that they had never been able to "run together". Ziva assures him that she will never forget him, and after his death, she is shown frequently wearing the orange beanie that Lt. Sanders wore when he went running.

In the fifth season finale, "Judgment Day (Part 2)", Ziva's liaison position is terminated under the orders of newly appointed Director Leon Vance following the death of Director Shepard. "Last Man Standing", the sixth season premiere, picks up with her having resumed working as a Mossad field agent and undercover in Morocco. After Gibbs notices footage of an unconscious Ziva on the news following an explosion where she was working, it is soon revealed that Vance had deliberately sent Ziva back to Israel in order to help uncover a mole within NCIS itself. She returns to the team at the conclusion of the episode.

As the sixth season progressed, storylines shifted to Ziva's "sense of homelessness" and dual loyalty, climaxing at the end of the season as Tony fatally shoots her boyfriend, Michael Rivkin, and her apartment is bombed. Ziva, as a result, tells Gibbs that she cannot continue to work with Tony because she no longer trusts him, and Gibbs accepts this for the time being, saying that he will give her time to "remember who she can trust". Shortly after returning to Mossad full-time, she is sent on a mission to take down a terrorist in Somalia named Saleem Ulman. After one member of her team is killed and the other two injured, leaving her the only agent able to continue, she sends the remaining two back to Israel and opts to continue on to the terrorist camp alone. She is subsequently captured and held hostage for several months.

Believed to be dead in the first episode of season 7, "Truth or Consequences", Ziva is nonetheless found alive later in the episode, rescued by DiNozzo and McGee, with Gibbs killing her captor himself. Following her rescue, she resigns from Mossad and applies to become a full-fledged NCIS agent and an American citizen. Ziva receives mandatory psych evaluations and therapy but refuses to discuss with anyone what had happened to her in Saleem's camp. However, it is made clear that she suffered extensive abuse and torture and it is implied that she was raped as well while in captivity. Cote de Pablo briefly addressed this, confirming that, "Bad things happened to Ziva in Africa when she was captured."

In season 7, she becomes a probationary NCIS agent pending U.S. citizenship, becoming a United States citizen in the season finale after successfully passing her exams. Her probationary period officially ends in the season 9 premiere.

Midway through the tenth season, Ziva's estranged father, Eli, resurfaces in the episode "Shabbat Shalom" in the hope of healing their relationship. During his time in Washington, he is also secretly meeting with a Palestinian-born Iranian (with an unclear connection to the Iranian government) whom he knows from childhood. Together, they hope to initiate the beginning of a peace agreement between Israel and Iran. At the end of the episode, while having a Shabbat dinner at Director Vance's house, an unknown shooter opens fire on the house, killing Eli and fatally wounding Vance's wife, who dies in the hospital. The shooter evades capture and then kills himself with cyanide in a cigarette, when Gibbs and David corner him. Upon discovering her father's body, Ziva breaks down sobbing and praying in Hebrew. In the wake of Eli's death, the CIA kills the Iranian in an explosion, ending any chance of a peace arranged by the two.

The following week, "Shiva" drew 22.86 million viewers and became the most watched episode in the series. It focuses on the immediate aftermath of the killings and establishes Ziva's desire to seek revenge. Throughout the episode, both she and Vance attempt to participate in the investigation despite being prohibited due to their connections with the deceased. Eventually, it is revealed that Eli was killed by his protégé, Ilan Bodnar (Oded Fehr), who Ziva had known since they were children. Bodner found out about the secret discussions between his boss and the Iranian official, and believes that David's actions could seriously threaten Israel's security. After a failed attempt to kill Ziva, he escapes and disappears.

Ziva becomes fixated on revenge as the season continues and ultimately kills Bodnar, albeit in self-defense. Executive producer Gary Glasberg divulged that the plot was designed to draw out aspects of the character's personality that had been dormant for several years, saying, "People are going to see a Ziva David that they haven't seen in a long time. There is a strength and a resolute determination."

=== Subsequent events ===
Following her resignation from NCIS in season ten, Ziva returns to Israel. Following an explosion, and the subsequent death of Secretary Clayton Jarvis, the remaining members of Gibbs' team are informed that Ziva's life is in danger. DiNozzo travels to Israel in order to ensure her safety, and the two share a passionate kiss. In season thirteen, it is revealed that they also consummated their relationship, leading to Ziva becoming pregnant. Though DiNozzo was not informed of this, Ziva gave birth to a daughter named Tali. In season thirteen ("Family First"), Ziva's farmhouse is destroyed in a mortar attack ordered by CIA Agent Trent Kort. Although Tali is found alive, the NCIS crew are informed that Ziva is dead, though her remains are not found at the house. DiNozzo subsequently departs NCIS in order to care for their daughter, and travel to both Israel (in search of answers), and Paris, in honor of Ziva's love for Paris.

Prior to the season thirteen finale, Ziva builds a strong friendship with her father's successor - Director Orli Elbaz - who later informs DiNozzo of the difficulty Ziva had faced while deciding whether to inform him of the birth of their daughter which Tony is given care of after Ziva is presumably killed.

In the season sixteen episode "She", NCIS reopens a ten-year-old cold case when they find the starving daughter of a woman who has been missing for ten years. While digging into the case files, Special Agents Eleanor Bishop and Nick Torres find that Ziva had kept notes on and had been secretly investigating the case after her departure from NCIS. While interviewing the girl's father and woman's boyfriend, he points them to a backyard building that Ziva had rented for years as a private office to write private journals as she coped with her job and life in America, though it hasn't been touched since her apparent death. Bishop tells Gibbs about this, who admits he suspected but warns her not to get personally involved in the case as it could get her killed. After finding the woman alive and arresting her kidnapper, Bishop goes to read a vengeful note from the woman's mother that Ziva had intended to read to the kidnapper, only to find that someone had already read it to him before she arrived. Realizing that Ziva is alive, Bishop runs to her private office only to find a note from Ziva asking her not to reveal her secret for the safety of her family. At the end of the season sixteen finale, "Daughters", Ziva shows up in Gibbs' basement to inform him that he is in danger.

During the season seventeen premiere, "Out of the Darkness", it is revealed that Ziva faked her death to protect her family from a woman named Sahar who wanted to kill her. Sahar was involved in a Hamas splinter group with Ziva's brother Ari, and is seeking revenge for his death.

Ziva is reunited with McGee and Ducky along with meeting new team members Bishop (who had protected her secret) and Torres. Her relationship with Gibbs is shown to be a little strained after his reaction to her supposed death in "Family First", something which Tony had confronted Gibbs about at the time. Ziva acknowledges Gibbs as her father and he apologises to Ziva for not questioning her death or seeking to find answers.

Ziva speaks about her desire to return "home" to Tony and their daughter Tali, who she has been watching from afar during her time hidden. Her separation from her daughter since her fake death has taken its toll on Ziva, who now takes medication for an anxiety disorder. After taking down Sahar in the second episode "Into the Light", Ziva prepares to leave, telling Gibbs she has one more thing to do before she puts it all behind her. Tony calls Gibbs and Ziva assures Gibbs that Tony will be hearing from her before she leaves. In the episode "The North Pole," the real Sahar (who had been posing as Gibbs' new neighbor "Sarah") tortures and kills Ziva's childhood friend Adam Eshel, and traps Ziva under a heavy plumbing pipe, planning to kill first her and then Tali, but is instead shot dead by Gibbs, leaving her son Phineas motherless. It's revealed that Tony knew that Ziva was alive and had tracked her down years ago, and that they both agreed to lay low until Sahar was dealt with for the sake of Tali.

The subsequent episode "In The Wind" has Ziva trying to help Gibbs find Phineas, after he runs away from Gibbs' house following Gibbs' revelation about his mother's death. During the course of their search, Ziva questions whether she can go back to her life with Tony and Tali. She states that she had texted Tony to let him know that it's safe, but no response. Tony then responds with a video of Tali asking Ziva to come home, which Gibbs states is proof she's ready to go home. With Phineas found and taken in by his aunt and uncle, Gibbs and the team say goodbye to Ziva before she leaves for Paris, to reunite with Tony and Tali.

== Development ==
=== Characterization ===
I'm not trying to play her as if I hope people like my character. I'm trying to make her as three dimensional as I can. I feel people are likable and not likable and I'm trying to find all those nooks and crannies in my character.

— Cote de Pablo on the characterization of Ziva

Cote de Pablo describes the character as someone who is "completely different from anyone else on the show" and that because "she's been around men all her life; she's used to men in authority. She's not afraid of men." She later stated that, "This woman is a soldier. She takes things to the extreme. She knows how to use all sorts of things—guns and knives—I would never imagine using. ... She's one tough woman, but it doesn't take away from the fact that she's still very sexy and playful and all of that. But, when it comes to work she means business." Ziva is often portrayed as calmly aggressive and does not shy away from physical altercations with suspects, though it has been acknowledged that she has become "a little bit softer" and "more inclined to listen before acting out" since her arrival at NCIS. She is not easily intimidated or rattled. She approaches her job with zeal, appearing to truly believe in what she does. She is very committed to the ideals of the U.S., in particular the bounds that law places on all citizens including the government.

Ziva is sometimes considered a "haunted" figure; she is a skilled assassin and is able to take life without hesitation or remorse when the situation requires, something that has not changed with her new affiliation with NCIS. In spite of this, Ziva is capable of displaying playfulness, nearly childishness at times, such as in "Heartland" when she gleefully races McGee to be the first to tell Tony and Abby about meeting Gibbs' father. She is particularly empathetic towards children, as demonstrated in episodes such as "Dagger" and "Outlaws and In-Laws".

Ziva is an Israeli Jew, and was always seen wearing a Star of David pendant until her capture in Somalia, where her captor ripped it off her neck. Shortly before her captivity, she said that she "would sooner die than take this necklace off". In early seasons, her Judaism is only alluded to, leading some commentators to identify her as a secular Israeli. She does not appear to follow Orthodox Jewish strictures, dating men who are not Jewish, though she celebrates Jewish holidays, observes Shabbat, and has been seen praying in Hebrew on several occasions. In the aftermath of her father's death in Season 10, she is shown praying in a synagogue, visiting the Western Wall in Jerusalem, and planting an olive tree. Ziva has made references to keeping kosher; however, in her second episode on the show, she is seen eating a slice of pepperoni pizza, which goes against kosher dietary laws. After being forced to fatally shoot her half-brother, Ari, to keep him from killing Gibbs, she quietly sings "El male rachamim" ("God, full of mercy"), an Ashkenazi Jewish mourning song, over Ari's body.

Aspects of Israeli culture are occasionally utilized within the series. For example, Ziva has been known to pick up falafel for lunch when she has to drive the van somewhere, and she appears to like music by Israeli hip-hop/funk band Hadag Nahash. She tends to drive very fast in an erratic manner, which she claims is the best way to avoid ambushes and roadside bombs, though her coworkers point out that neither are likely in the U.S.

=== Wardrobe ===
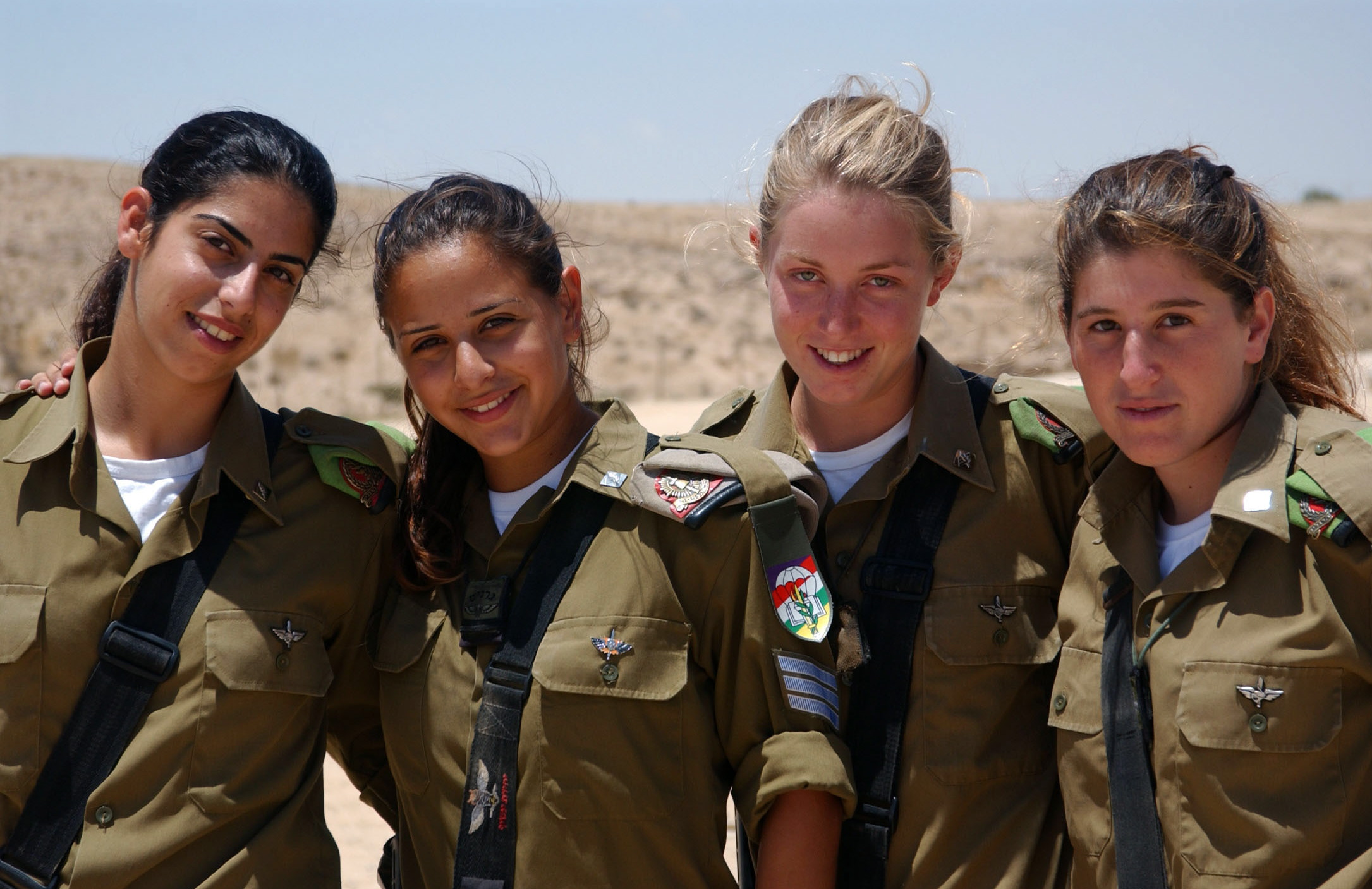
Ziva is introduced wearing an IDF uniform jacket to show the "military influence" on the character

NCIS costume designers initially had Ziva's clothing style fluctuate; she is introduced wearing an IDF uniform jacket, cargo pants, and combat boots to illustrate "the Israeli military influence" on the character but afterwards is frequently dressed in high heels and skirts in a manner similar to her predecessor, Kate Todd. On realizing that the latter was impractical for an officer of the Mossad, designers settled on a more simple and low-maintenance style. Subsequently, "T-shirt, cargos, ponytail" became Ziva's signature look. This allowed Cote de Pablo to typically be "in and out of hair and makeup in all of 20 minutes". She explained, "From what I've been told, I'm one of the quickest girls in the business as far as getting ready everyday for NCIS. I put on my cargos, my T-Shirt, my microphone, my hair is usually up in a ponytail and I wear very little makeup."

An exception was made for the premiere episode of the sixth season, during which Ziva goes undercover as a bar singer. De Pablo opposed the idea at first and did not want to sing on the show, believing it would be out of character for Ziva. Despite this, she agreed to after executive producer Shane Brennan described the scene. For the opening of the episode, she was dressed in a blue, backless dress that, according to NCIS Costume Supervisor Rachel Good, was made by the show's wardrobe department. "We decided we wanted something sexy but long that revealed a lot but wasn't short or vulgar in any way," said de Pablo. "It had to be sexy and provocative, but in a long, sexy, sleek way."

More details were fleshed out as the character continued to develop. Costume designers wanted to show her acclimation to life in the United States and in doing so made her wardrobe less militarily influenced. However, they maintained the same basic style, keeping her regularly dressed in cargo pants and boots. Rachel Good felt that she needed to always be wearing a gun but wanted it to be concealed; given the task of "making her look sexy while still covering a huge holster piece on her hip", Good opted to have de Pablo frequently wear long coats while filming. These changes allowed Ziva to be "a hybrid of sorts" in terms of dress.

=== Stunts ===
Over the course of the show, Ziva has been involved in numerous action and combat scenes. Cote de Pablo frequently did her own stunts, saying that she "liked the challenge of learning to fight and enjoyed the adrenaline rush". She described some of the work as "intense" and "taxing on the body" but added, "Coming from the theater I love that. You get home and you're exhausted, but you feel like you've really worked." She sustained several injuries while filming—"I hurt myself a lot. I hurt my neck, I hurt my groin, my pelvis and I had a couple of injuries that were really hard to deal with." After injuring her neck, de Pablo decided to partially stop doing stunt scenes during the tenth season and "let the pros do what they do best".

In July 2013, NCIS received an Emmy nomination for "Outstanding Stunt Coordination for a Drama Series, Miniseries, or Movie" for the tenth season episode "Revenge". The stunt performed in that episode involved an extended fight scene between de Pablo's character and her father's killer. When the NCIS cast was honored by the Red Cross at the Santa Monica Red Carpet in April of that year, co-star Brian Dietzen stated that de Pablo had worked on the scene throughout the previous night until six in the morning and, as a result, was unable to attend the event.

=== Language abilities ===
[Ziva]'s like a little prodigy when it comes to languages and that's what makes the character fun to play. And it obviously presents a huge challenge to me because whenever they throw something else at me I just have to sort of tackle it and go with it.

— Cote de Pablo on Ziva and languages

Ziva speaks ten languages: Hebrew, Arabic, Turkish, English, Spanish, French, Pashto, German, Italian, and Russian. Cote de Pablo is occasionally required to perform dialogues in Hebrew, Ziva's native language. She said of the process, "When I learn it, I learn it like a prayer, chanting it for a while. I have a good ear for language and, truthfully, I picked up the language pretty fast."

At one point, de Pablo was given 48 hours to memorize a monologue in Hebrew. She divulged that she used to criticize other actors who portrayed Latin characters and did not speak convincing Spanish but changed that perspective after having to learn Hebrew to depict Ziva. "Everything I had judgments on has turned around and bitten me in the butt," she explained.

A running gag in the series, referred to by fans as "Ziva-isms", is Ziva frequently misusing, misunderstanding or just completely mangling American slang, cultural references, colloquialisms, and idioms. For example: In "Silver War", she said she felt like a "donkey's butt" when she meant "horse's ass". In another episode, she says "You can't make an omelette without breaking a few legs" instead of 'eggs'.

== Relationships ==
=== NCIS team and colleagues ===
The interactions of the NCIS team are often perceived as familial among viewers, and Cote de Pablo has commented, "I've always thought of Ziva as the adopted kid who comes in and has this really funny thing with one of the siblings, which is Tony." Ziva's arrival at NCIS initially draws mixed reactions from other characters. Both Ducky and McGee accept her immediately, with the latter living near her and assisting her in finding the best routes to work. Abby, by contrast, hates her at first glance, believing that Ziva was taking the place of her good friend, Special Agent Kate Todd, and resenting McGee's fascination and admiration for Ziva. During the course of her hate, Abby scribbles over photographs of Ziva, deliberately mispronounces her surname, and becomes annoyed when Ziva is praised.

Ziva's relationships with her colleagues steadily improve, and she invites Gibbs, Abby, McGee, and Palmer over to her apartment for dinner in the third season. Abby, who thinks Ziva is an excellent cook, begins to soften towards her, as the latter works to earn her friendship, first by helping Abby put a bomb back together for information and later by remembering her birthday. Abby, in turn, expresses concern when Ziva and Tony go missing in "Boxed In". In the third season finale, the tension comes to a head, and Abby angrily tells Ziva she has no emotions, prompting both women to slap each other. They later apologize after Tony goads them into it, and both women punch him in the arm when he jokingly suggests that they should "tongue-kiss" one another.

By Season 4, their friendship has grown and Ziva is accepted by the rest of the team, as shown in the season's premiere, "Shalom", where Tony and the rest of the team put their careers on the line and vow to prove Ziva's innocence before she is apprehended by the FBI for a crime she did not commit, knowing that their involvement could land them in prison. By the fifth and sixth seasons, Abby and Ziva are firm friends. When Ziva first appeared, she would flinch whenever Abby would hug her; however, by Season 6, Ziva overcomes her discomfort, and now accepts and returns the hugs.

Ziva's relationship with McGee develops to resemble one of a brother and sister. While Ziva teases McGee a great deal, often with Tony, they remain on friendly terms (Ziva's teasing is far more playful than Tony's, who takes a much more sadistic approach to the pranks he pulls on McGee) and continue to communicate when the team was disbanded between Seasons 5 and 6. He and Abby both urge Ziva to repair her friendship with Tony in the aftermath of their fallout in the sixth season finale. After Ziva is revealed to be alive, McGee outright states that Ziva is like a sister to him and he trusts and understands her enough that Ziva simply shaking her head at McGee from a distance is a request that he stand down that McGee follows.

Ziva seems to have a good relationship with Ducky. When she comes back to NCIS with Tony and McGee, Ducky is the only one who has solid faith in her. In "Silver War", their friendship becomes more permanent when Ziva saves both of them from death at the hands of a murderer. Ducky is often seen sticking up for her when she has quarrels with Tony. She has also been seen going to him for advice and sharing a cup of tea with him. In Season 7, he persuaded her to briefly open up on the horrific series of events which led to her captivity in Somalia, culminating in her telling him that, "[He] should keep [his] distance [from her] ... The ones who get too close always end up dead." Overall they value each other a lot.

McGee, Abby, and Ducky all support Ziva as she prepares to become an American citizen in the seventh season, with McGee even quizzing her for the citizenship exam. In the finale, they are all present at her swearing in ceremony. According to de Pablo, Ziva had grown closer to her coworkers at NCIS than to what remained of her blood family by this point in the series.

Like the rest of her colleagues, Ziva initially resents Vance for breaking up Gibbs' team. After this is resolved, she doesn't appear to hold a grudge against her boss, and they seem to enjoy each other's company. According to NCIS writer Christopher Waild, as a result of the murders of her father and Vance's wife in the same attack, "the tragedy of Ziva and Eli now also extends into the Vance family." Vance, aware that he cannot do so on his own for his children's sake, looks the other way while Ziva pursues revenge against the killer and continues to support her despite drawing ire from other agencies.

==== Anthony "Tony" DiNozzo ====
DiNozzo describes his relationship with Ziva as "a connection". The two later have a daughter named Tali, who is the reason Tony resigns from NCIS after learning Ziva had presumably died in a mortar attack (though Ziva had faked her death to escape from Sahar, a woman who had worked alongside Ziva's dead half-brother Ari).

==== Leroy Jethro Gibbs ====
Gibbs' relationship with Ziva has been called that of a surrogate father figure by executive producer Gary Glasberg, a tendency that intensified after she severed contact with Eli David following her return from Somalia. Cote de Pablo explained, "[Ziva's] got what I think you could call anger issues. She thinks she's been betrayed by her family, particularly her father. That's a big deal to her. Which would also explain her love and relationship with somebody like Leroy Jethro Gibbs." Ziva seems to be more willing to show her vulnerability to Gibbs than to most of the other characters, and Michael Weatherly suggested in 2012 that she might have become something of a "hellcat" without Gibbs' guidance. Additionally, Ziva and Gibbs share several characteristics: they both rarely show emotion, speak several languages, and are extremely skilled at what they do. Though she often finds it difficult to follow his orders due to the autonomy she had as a Mossad control officer, Ziva looks up to Gibbs as a leader and often restrains herself from resorting to her assassin background in situations where he would not approve. He often uses this background to their advantage, however, by choosing her to interrogate certain suspects.

I think probably the only person Ziva truly, truly trusts is Gibbs. I don't think she'd put her life in anyone's hands but Gibbs'. I mean, she loves everybody else. But she's been able to explore different things with this person, and he's sort of a father figure in many ways, so I think she feels safe with him, and I feel that he's been the only one really who's seen that level of vulnerability from her. That is their little secret, which is what I like about the relationship.

— Cote de Pablo, 2009

Of all her relationships with the team, Ziva and Gibbs' has undergone the most growth. Initially, Gibbs distrusts Ziva as she is Ari Haswari's control agent. Ziva also bears the brunt of Gibbs' anger after Caitlin Todd was murdered. Ziva ultimately kills Ari, who was also her half brother, in order to save Gibbs' life. This event serves as the initial foundation for their relationship, and Gibbs takes responsibility for Ari's shooting in order to spare Ziva further pain.

There is still tension, however, stemming both from NCIS director Jenny Shepard's decision to add Ziva to the team without consulting him and Ziva's habit of occasionally calling on Shepard, with whom she had a close relationship, to obtain key information in a case without going through regular channels (as seen in the Season 3 episode "Head Case"). However, this tension is lessened in the conclusion of the episode "Silver War" after Ziva saved Ducky's life. Ducky later tells Gibbs, "You took to Ziva more quickly than to any other agent before her. Timothy, Caitlin, even DiNozzo. I've always sensed there's a strong bond between the two of you. Something shared perhaps."

Season 3's "Hiatus" shows how much Ziva is affected when Gibbs is critically injured in an explosion and awakes with memory loss. In "Hiatus Part 1", Ducky unintentionally chastises Ziva for not asking which hospital Gibbs was taken to after the explosion; upsetting her when he implies that Ziva does not care for Gibbs like the rest of the team does. She also finds herself being slapped by Abby when she comments about Gibbs' possible death scenario. Ziva appears in the bathroom following this, extremely upset by the fact that they think that she does not care. In the second part of this episode, Ziva visits Gibbs at the hospital in the night and begs him to remember. When he becomes angry, Ziva uses his hand to slap the back of her head, causing Gibbs to remember himself within his team. He remembers that Ziva saved his life and that she had killed her brother to do it while Ziva breaks down and cries into his arms. He remarks that he owes her at the end of the episode, something that would become true when he returns to the US during "Shalom" to help in clearing her name after being framed for murder and a terrorist bombing by Iranian Intelligence.

In the Season 7 episode "Reunion", Gibbs confronts Ziva about Director Vance's allegation that she had been ordered by Mossad Director David to gain his trust by killing Ari. She admits that she had been under orders to kill Ari when it became clear that he was out of control, but elucidates that she had never intended to go through with it, believing him to be innocent. She further confides to Gibbs her feelings on the subject of Ari's death and her family: "I would have lied to you. He was my brother, and you were nothing. But I was wrong about Ari, and you ... Now he is gone. Eli is all but dead to me and the closest thing I have to a father is accusing me ...". Ziva reveals that when she finally killed Ari, it was truly to save Gibbs and she was not following her orders, re-earning Gibbs' trust. In the seventh season episode "Good Cop, Bad Cop", the bodies aboard the Damocles are recovered and Mossad attempts to make Ziva the scapegoat for the death of Staff Sergeant Daniel Cryer, USMC, one of the passengers. After he persuades her to tell her version of the story and she is cleared, Gibbs whispers something to her and kisses her on the forehead, causing her to break down in tears of relief. Mark Harmon later disclosed that he had improvised the final moments of the scene, and when questioned about what Gibbs said, replied, "[De Pablo]'s not gonna tell you any more than I am—I don't think. That's our secret." Following investigation into Ziva's role in the events aboard the Damocles, Director Vance approves an exonerated Ziva's application to join NCIS after initially rejecting it. Director Vance hands the approved application to Agent Gibbs, who in turn transmits it to Ziva, whom he calls "Probie".

In Season 7's final episode Gibbs misses Ziva's citizenship ceremony due to a visit from Alison Hart. She seems to have forgiven this, however, and in the Season 8 episode "Dead Air", she asks him to play "catch" with her. In the Season 8 episode "Baltimore", after learning that her partner Tony DiNozzo arrested Gibbs when he first met their boss, Ziva comments that she would rather arrest her own father than Gibbs. In the Season 9 episode "Safe Harbor", Ziva questions his seemingly solitude lifestyle, prompting him to respond, "You're never alone when you have kids," kissing her forehead and adding, "Good night, kid."

When Ziva learns that her boyfriend who had proposed to her was the murderer of a Navy petty officer, Gibbs is the only one to accompany her when she confronts him and he tries to comfort Ziva very much as a father would afterwards.

After Ziva's return in season 17, she is somewhat angry and bitter at Gibbs for accepting her death and never searching for her. Ziva tells Gibbs that a conversation they had about spending more time with his daughter wasn't about Kelly; it was about her. This shows that, to Ziva, Gibbs is her father. The two later reconcile.

=== Family ===
Ziva is depicted as having a complex family history, and, as of the tenth season, all of her immediate family is deceased: Tali, her seldom-mentioned younger sister, was killed in a terrorist attack against Israel; her mother died in an unspecified violent incident; Ziva shot and killed her half-brother to save Gibbs; and her father was shot dead in a targeted killing.

She evidently had a close relationship with her siblings, describing her sister as "the best of us" and as a person who had a great deal of compassion. In Season 10's Shell Shock (Part II), Ziva tells Tony that she goes to the opera every year on Tali's birthday, as Tali had wanted to be a singer. When Ari Haswari, her older half brother by her father, is accused of murdering Special Agent Caitlin Todd, she acts as his control officer and adamantly defends him. Her choice to fatally shoot Ari after his guilt becomes apparent in order to prevent him from killing Gibbs is often regarded as a pivotal moment for the character and a recurring subject within the show. Vance calls her motives into question in the episode "Aliyah" and charges her with acting on orders. However, Ziva later makes clear to Gibbs that she did in fact shoot her brother in order to save him, saying, "I pulled the trigger to save your life. I was not following orders." Though Ziva seems to feel that killing Ari was justified, she still struggles with guilt and coming to terms with his death.

==== Eli David ====
Ziva and her father, Mossad Director Eli David, often have a somewhat strained relationship, especially following the death of her half-brother Ari. She recalls him taking his children into the forest for "fun" blindfolded and making them find their own way back. When Ziva was a child her father told her that one "can never truly know a person or their secrets". At the time, she had refused to believe him but later said that he had never been more honest with her. It is remarked upon several times that Eli "raised her to be a killer", a fact that he does not deny and explains to Director Vance: "Every day is a fight to survive. It is my dream that my daughter will not have to make that decision with her sons and her daughters. I would like my grandchildren to be doctors and architects. To live a happy life. To grow fat and old."

In the episode "Aliyah", Ziva is called home to Israel where her father says that he does not know if he can trust her and wants her to remain in Israel. She stays in Tel Aviv with her father and Mossad. The episode ends with a cliffhanger in which Ziva is being tortured at a terrorist camp in Somalia by Saleem. It is later revealed that her father sent her on this mission despite knowing that the risks made it a suicide mission. Gibbs holds Eli responsible for Ziva's captivity and subsequent abuse by Saleem and his men, saying that Ziva did not have a choice and that "her father left her to die in a desert."

Ziva regards these events as a betrayal and states, "Eli is all but dead to me," implying that she no longer wants to be a part of his life. Shortly after her being rescued from Somalia, she sends an email to her father formally resigning from Mossad and applies to become an official NCIS agent. Eli attempts to prevent her from leaving Mossad by having her former team leader Malachi Ben-Gidon accuse her of killing a marine who had been among those who died on the Damocles. Later, when the NCIS team proves that Ziva was not responsible for the marine's death, Gibbs angrily tells Ben-Gidon to tell Eli that Ziva was "off limits".

Eli and Ziva do not communicate until he visits the U.S. on official business in Season 8, seemingly resenting his daughter and the choice she made to become a U.S. citizen. He dismisses her ordeal in the desert with the remark "You are not dead." Gibbs is annoyed that Eli refers to Ziva as "her" and points out "She has a name. Ziva. She has a name." Later Ziva questions Eli's apathy towards the prospect of his own death, saying that a human man would at least feel some emotion, prompting him to tell her that while he did not have the luxury of expressing his feelings, as he had to constantly put the safety of the nation before everything else, there was once a time when things were different, "when my house was filled with the sound of children laughing." Before Eli's departure back to Israel in the following episode, his relationship with Ziva appears to have somewhat improved, as he is shown to have given her a small Israeli flag and kissed her goodbye.

Even with the complexity of what existed between Ziva and Eli, at the end of the day, he was her father and she loved him. There are good memories that go with the bad ... It absolutely weighs on her. When anyone loses someone, you think about what they meant to you and what part of them you continue to carry.

— Executive producer Gary Glasberg, 2013

In the Season 10 episode, "Shabbat Shalom", Eli comes to the United States to reconcile and spend time with Ziva. Though she accepts his efforts, they suffer another falling out and shortly afterwards he is fatally wounded by machine gunfire in an attack on the house during Shabbat dinner. Ziva breaks down when she realizes that Eli had succumbed to his injuries, cradling her father's dead body while sobbing and praying in Hebrew.

In the following episode, after it is revealed that Eli's protégé Ilan Bodnar was behind his killing, he is buried in Israel and Ziva delivers his eulogy. Flashbacks expound on their relationship during her early adolescence as she pursues revenge against Bodnar in the latter half of the season. Though their interactions are depicted as affectionate and Eli is shown teaching a 13-year-old Ziva (Gabi Coccio) the Shabbat blessing in one scene, tensions result from his frequent absence due to his work and an affair with a female Mossad operative leads to the disintegration of his marriage to Ziva's mother.

==== Tali ====
Named for Ziva's deceased sister, Talia David-Dinozzo is the daughter of Ziva and Tony. In 2016, Tali survives a mortar attack that presumably kills Ziva, and is introduced to her father shortly thereafter at the behest of Mossad Director Orli Elbaz. Tony bonds with Tali and leaves with her for Israel and Paris to look for answers.

== Reception ==
=== General ===
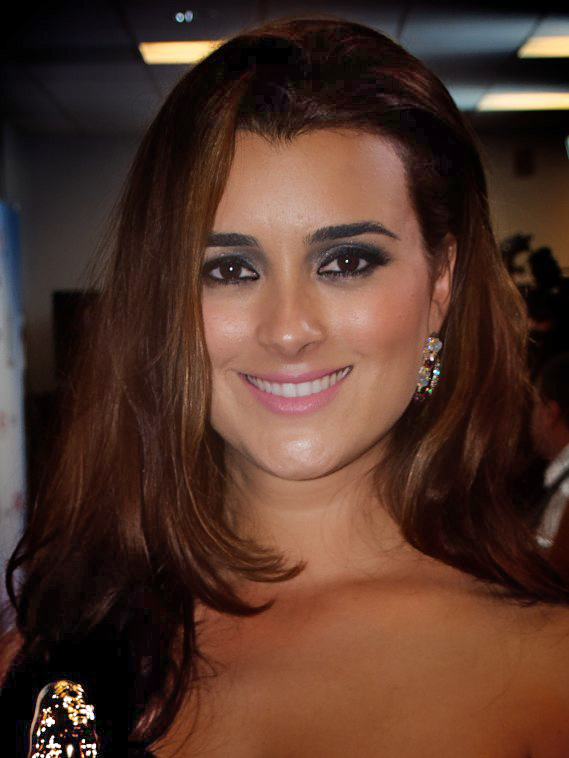
Cote de Pablo at the 2011 ALMA Awards, where she won Favorite Television Actress – Leading Role in a Drama

Though viewers were initially wary of Sasha Alexander's replacement, Cote de Pablo received "huge praise" over the years for her portrayal of Ziva David, later winning an ALMA Award and an Imagen Award. In 2013, E-Poll Market Research released the results of a study naming the top 10 most appealing celebrities in America. De Pablo was ranked third, behind only actresses Betty White and Sandra Bullock. Other figures on the list included de Pablo's co-star, Pauley Perrette (Abby Sciuto), British singer Adele, and Olympian Gabby Douglas.

Entertainment Weekly included Ziva in its compile of "29 Female TV Characters You'd Date", placing her at number 17, and Postnoon included her in its list of "The sexiest cops on TV". In December 2011, TVLine announced Ziva as the winner of its "Ultimate Female Law-Enforcement Crushes Bracket Tournament". The tournament consisted of 64 nominated female characters from police procedural shows and several single-elimination rounds, garnering nearly one million votes by the end. Mary Edwards from the Reasons to be Beautiful Magazine published a list of "5 Great Female TV Characters of 2011" and wrote, "If any woman could have ended up a cold, emotionless killing machine, [Ziva]'d be a top candidate. But she's not ... She learns what it's like to have compassion and loyalty. She grows up. As an immigrant, she faces prejudice and racism, but she handles it with poise."

Her frequent misunderstanding of American idioms and slang has been described as "endearing" and is generally considered an appealing aspect of the show. Shortly after Ziva joined the series, Noel Holston from Sun Sentinel described her as "an exotically beautiful Israeli whose tendency toward malaprop English belies her investigative and interrogative experience". In 2007, Jewish Exponent editor Michael Elkin commented, "All shook up? That's the freshness she's injected into [NCIS], which just wrapped its fourth season with military honors and where second-season de Pablo is de anti-pablum, a no-nonsense ninja of a nemesis for those nasty evil-doers who soon discover that the Israeli is for real." In a 2012 publication of The Jewish Daily Forward, Lilit Marcus wrote, "Despite being unevenly written, Ziva was always compelling: She was tough, fearless and, often, tender." C. Coville from Cracked magazine questioned the choice to script her as "an espionage expert who knows nine languages ... all at age 28", describing excessive multilingualism as a common problem in television dramas.

Ziva's "will they/won't they" relationship with Tony DiNozzo, dubbed "Tiva" by viewers, became a prominent subject of interest. Maureen Ryan from Chicago Tribune commented that their "love-hate banter gives the show extra zip" during de Pablo's first year with the series. Due to being drawn out over several years, the development has been called a "slow burn", with Tony and Ziva being included in TV Tango's "Top 10 Romantically Challenged TV Couples". Entertainment Weekly described them as a "power couple" in 2013 and contributor Sandra Gonzalez noted that "it's tough to deny the chemistry the two actors (Michael Weatherly and Cote de Pablo) share" after "Housekeeping" aired.

=== Leaving the series ===
On July 10, 2013, CBS announced that Cote de Pablo would leave the series during the eleventh season of NCIS for undisclosed reasons. The network released the following statement: "We respect Cote's decision, thank her for being an important part of the 'NCIS' team, and for eight terrific years playing Ziva David. Cote and CBS share a great respect for the 'NCIS' audience, and we look forward to working with her and the producers on appropriate closure in this chapter of Ziva's story." De Pablo, who agreed to appear in part of the season, commented, "I've had 8 great years with NCIS and Ziva David. I have huge respect and affection for Mark, Gary, Michael, David, Rocky, Pauley, Brian, Sean, all of the team and CBS. I look forward to finishing Ziva's story."

Viewers sent "many e-mails, letters, notes, cards, posters, and so on to CBS headquarters and individuals at CBS" as well as cupcakes and M&Ms in protest. Many tucked paperclips into their letters, as they had become commonly associated with the character of Ziva following a Season 4 episode that featured her telling Tony, "I will kill you 18 different ways with this paper clip." Television Critics Association member Jane Boursaw published a letter sent by Dutch fan Dianne Lodder on her website. Lodder later wrote an editorial that was published in The Huffington Post analyzing the reasoning behind viewers' responses. Using writings by Blakey Vermeule, she explained, "Fiction allows us a rare insight into the minds and hearts of its characters, its people. An insight that we often wish for in real life."

CBS chief executive Les Moonves attempted to pacify fan outrage by claiming that de Pablo was offered "a lot of money" to stay on the show and that "the cast and the producers were aware with what was going on". De Pablo herself stated that her departure was "overwhelmingly hard—at times terrifying" and that it had not been planned. However, she declined to explain the reason behind it.

=== Cultural significance ===
==== Israelis in fiction ====
Ziva, and Cote de Pablo's depiction of her, has been analyzed and commented upon by a number of critics, opinion columnists, and academics. She is credited as being the only Israeli regular on mainstream American television as well as the "most prominent televisual Israeli". Sarah Honig, an Israeli journalist and opinion columnist, wrote that Ziva is "quite possibly the only Jewish regular on American TV who's unapologetic, complex-free, and not comically dysfunctional" as well as "the only positive Israeli sort on the screen anywhere" in The Jerusalem Post. Jewish commentators gave the character favorable reviews, with Jewcy's Abe Fried-Tanzer stating, "Linguistic difficulties aside, Ziva is the show's most stable and dependable character, as steadfast as Harmon's Gibbs. Upon her arrival in Washington, D.C., Ziva proves her loyalty time and again, first saving the life of her future mentor Gibbs by shooting her murderous half-brother who was threatening him. That selfless, endearing act is representative of the kind of behavior that Ziva later exhibits over the seasons as she bends over backward to defend her teammates amid, and in spite of, the jokes her foreigner status frequently elicits. Ziva's portrayer, Cote de Pablo, is not Israeli, nor is she Jewish. Though the Catholic-born Chilean actress' pronunciation of the name of her character's home country leaves something to be desired, she does capture a certain Israeli toughness and no-nonsense attitude." Rabbi Elliot B. Gertel agreed that Ziva's sympathetic portrayal allowed the series to fairly show the security concerns of the Israeli government and the measures it takes to defend its citizens while still maintaining its role as a "good and helpful ally" to the United States.

In a network television landscape where it is difficult to find many unashamedly Jewish characters (let alone an Israeli) we have a soft spot for Ziva David.

— Galus Australis, 2009

The realism of her depiction also became a subject of discussion, and de Pablo's imitation of an Israeli accent and performances in Hebrew have been both praised and criticized. Anthony Frosh of Galus Australis suggested that her unrelentingly patriotic attitude did not reflect that of a typical Israeli, while Honig wrote that that trait helped Israeli viewers to identify with her more. Huffington Post critic William Bradley thought that the Chilean-born de Pablo was "surprisingly convincing" as a Mossad officer. Alex Joffe, a writer for Jewish Ideas Daily, added that when Mossad agents do appear on the American screen, it is often as "more extreme pictures of the general types and dilemmas", using The Debt as a primary example. He believed that Ziva, "a one-woman army, full of secrets", fell into this category but concluded that she was still "the most positive recurring Israeli character on American television".

De Pablo herself has been to Israel, visiting in 2007 after she received an invitation from the Israeli government. Shortly after returning, she stated in an interview that "Someone from the Israeli department of tourism watched the show and saw that there was an Israeli character on the show, and they were very happy about that. So they offered to give me a full tour of Israel. ... I'm still trying to digest everything. Everywhere you go, you're surrounded by Muslims and Christians and Jews, you can feel the tension, and you can understand why that is going on, but at the same time, everywhere you walk is holy. I went to [the historic fort] Masada, I floated on the Dead Sea. ... It was more of a trip for Ziva than for Cote. It absolutely informed my insights into her soul." She concluded that she ultimately thought that Ziva was a fairly accurate representation of the Israeli public.

The character's cultural impact was enhanced when she became popular among viewers, as she "[represents] the whole Israeli security establishment, if not Israeli society in general" for the audience. Rabbi Gertel and Harvard preceptor Eitan Kensky agreed that Ziva affected viewers' opinions of Israel, with the latter stating that she helped to increase understanding of Israeli culture. Slate magazine's June Thomas wrote that Ziva is particularly appealing to conservative Americans: "David represents those aspects of the Israeli character that most appeal to middle America: She's disciplined, self-reliant, good with guns, and skilled in hand-to-hand combat." The character has also been compared to the heroines of early kibbutz dramas, as well as prominent Israeli politicians in the way she interacts with her American colleagues. Steven L. Spiegel, Director of the Center for Middle East Development and Professor of Political Science at the University of California, Los Angeles (UCLA), likened her to Israeli president Shimon Peres and prime ministers Ehud Olmert and Yitzhak Rabin, while Honig satirically remarked that she would make a better prime minister than Yesh Atid candidate, Yair Lapid.

Other commentators believed that the significance of Ziva extended to the depiction of Jews on television, and My Jewish Learning included her on its list of "Jewish Characters on TV: The Best of 2009". Political columnist Mark Vogl examined the cultural and political impact of a positive Israeli figure as well as her role in dispelling stereotypes about Jewish women:

Ziva David, a principle [sic] character in NCIS, has really altered my view of the Jewish people and Israel's plight. I know stereotypes are politically incorrect, but it does not mean they don't exist, and it also doesn't mean there isn't something to them. Somehow I just don't think Ziva is what people think of when they think of Jewish women. Given the staying power of NCIS, and the impact of Ziva, maybe that stereotype of Jewish women has been reset. ... The character and actress' success may be an unexpected bonus. Ziva, played by Cote de Pablo, is a beautiful, sexy woman with a great smile and terrific eyes. She is funny, easy to like, professional, and believable. But she is also extremely smart, a strong contributor to the team, and lethal with weapons and martial arts. ... One very wise mentor of mine told me that he thought Ziva might represent a subtle shift within the Jewish world. It was his observation that in past years the woman played a secondary role in much of Jewish life. He felt that Ziva's ascendancy marked a change in Jewish culture. He went so far as to point out the camaraderie between Ziva and her father. Who knows, this observation might be accurate. I am totally unfamiliar with the traditions of the Hebrew people. However, I do believe Ziva has been an excellent representative of the Jewish people.

While the character was generally praised, storylines surrounding her relationship with her father, Eli David, drew controversy. Kensky questioned whether having "a trained assassin psychologically scarred by her father" was a reversal of the archetypical Jewish male who is weak and dominated by his mother.

==== Women in police procedurals ====
Ziva has been called "one of the strongest women on TV". Mike Hale from The New York Times used the character as a principal example while analyzing the portrayal of female characters on live action television shows, saying, "With her credible combination (by prime-time standards) of physical domination and quiet cool, Ziva David is one of the most appealing of a growing group of female action heroes who are infiltrating cop shows, spy shows, science-fiction shows and other genres where men once did the lion's share of the enforcing." Lilly J. Goren, a professor of politics and global studies at Carroll University, and Justin S. Vaughn, an assistant professor of political science at Boise State University, expressed similar views in their co-authored book, Women in the White House: Gender, Popular Culture, and Presidential Politics. They focused on the fact that the lead female agent "was acknowledged to be tougher and physically stronger than most men on the show". Columnist Mark Vogl added, "John Wayne and Clint Eastwood probably couldn't get away with their reliance on brute force today. But feminists love to see a small, thin woman kick a big guy's butt."

Shane Brennan, the show's producer at the time, elaborated on Ziva's role in action scenes and explained, "We try to deliver that, but we try to be credible about it. You'll never see her leap in the air and do the splits and kick two guys at the same time. Save that for the John Woo movie." Cote de Pablo has said, "I love all of the fighting, using knives and guns and all of that. And my favorite thing in the world is doing stunts! I am surprisingly good at picking up fighting sequences. It's so much fun as a girl to go out there and pin guys against walls, knee them and punch them and kick some butt. Not a lot of women on TV get a chance to do that."

== See also ==
- Ziva David captivity storyline
- Tony DiNozzo and Ziva David
