= Esther K. Chae =

American actress

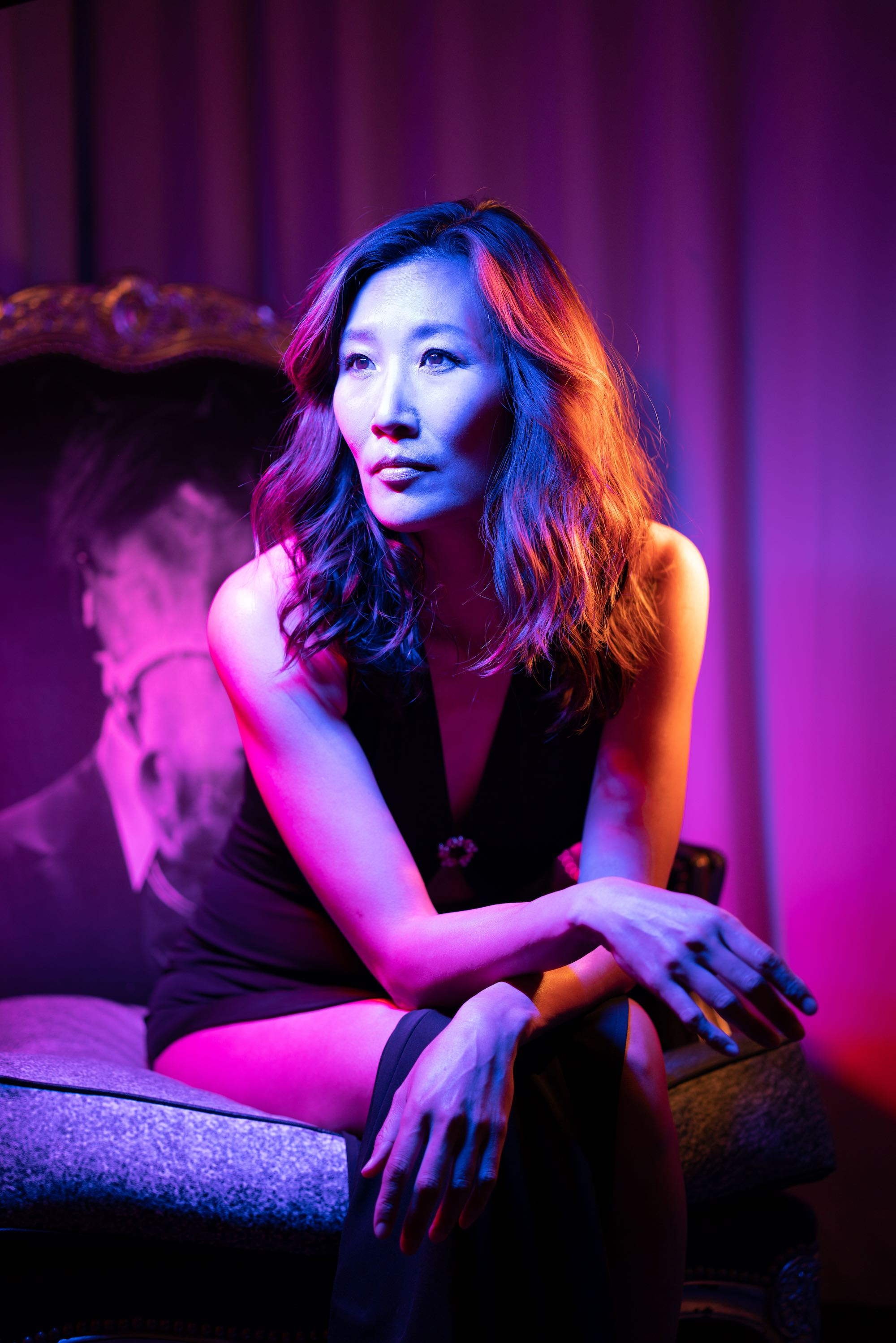
- Born: Esther K. Chae; Eugene, Oregon, U.S.
- Education: Korea University (BA); University of Michigan, Ann Arbor (MA); Yale University (MFA)
- Occupation: Actor

Korean name
- Hangul: 채경주
- RR: Chae Gyeongju
- MR: Ch'ae Kyŏngju

Esther Chae (Korean: 채경주) is an American actress, published playwright, speaker and consultant for Korean entertainment and Hollywood. Chae has appeared in numerous television shows such as NCIS, Law and Order: Criminal Intent, The West Wing, The Shield, and ER. She has also performed on theater stages including Yale Repertory Theater, La MaMa Experimental Theatre Club, Mark Taper Forum/ Kirk Douglas Theater, East West Players, P.S. 122, and Harvard/American Repertory Theater. Chae was among the inaugural class of TED fellows in 2009. She wrote and performed in So The Arrow Flies, an 80-minute one-woman performance about a North Korean spy and the FBI agent that hunts her down. It touches on post-9/11 themes of terrorism, political ideology, national identity and mother-daughter relationships.

== Early life and education ==
Chae is the daughter of Dr. Hi-kyung Chae and Mrs. Inja Chae. She was born in Eugene, Oregon, and at the age of five moved to Seoul, South Korea.

She graduated from Korea University with a B.A. in French Literature. Upon graduation, she returned to the United States. Chae earned her M.A. in Theater Studies at the University of Michigan and her M.F.A in Acting at the Yale School of Drama.

== Career ==
Esther Chae has been covered by the New York Times, Los Angeles Times, and Hollywood Reporter. Her life in Hollywood was the subject of a Korean Broadcasting Station (KBS) documentary.

Esther's television roles include NCIS, Law and Order: Criminal Intent, The West Wing, 24, The Shield, and numerous national commercials; her theatre credits include Yale Repertory Theater, La Mama, Mark Taper Forum / Kirk Douglas Theater and Harvard/A.R.T. She currently teaches Advanced Acting for TV and Film at Emerson College (LA).

As a consultant, she has worked extensively in the entertainment business for the past two decades on major hits such as World of Dance (NBC), Black Panther (Marvel), Lost (ABC) and other high-profile projects.

Esther is an inaugural TED Fellow and has presented her talks at TED, TEDx, Arts Council of Korea and numerous other conferences.

Her unique experience as a speaker, actor and teacher allows her to help others hone their public storytelling and presentation skills. As a speaker coach, she teaches students how to craft effective presentations for business at Yonsei University (Seoul), and has worked with companies such as Sephora, XPrize, Overseas Koreans Foundation and other prominent private clients.

== Notable awards and recognition ==
In 2015, Chae was invited to speak at TEDxPHX where she presented "WIBLDD: What If Bruce Lee Didn't Die." This talk and performance highlighted the state of Asian American representation in the media and arts through a staged conversation with a 75-year-old Bruce Lee.

In 2014, Chae was nominated for the "Extraordinary Chambers" (Play), 'Outstanding Dramatic Production,' and 'Outstanding Ensemble' by San Diego Theater Critic Circle.

In 2010, Chae received the 2010 APA Heritage Trailblazer Award by New York governor David Paterson. That year, she also received the 2010 University of Michigan Emerging Artist Alumni Award & King/Chavez/Parks Visiting Professorship and Emerging Artist Award.

In 2009, she was one of the inaugural 2009 TED Fellows. At the conference she performed an excerpt from her solo performance So The Arrow Flies.

In 2008, Chae was invited to the University of Southern California's Network of Korean-American Leaders (NetKAL) Fellowship Program which promotes community leadership among successful second-generation Korean-Americans.

In 2007, Chae was awarded the Korean Wave (Hallryu) Asia Star Award which was nationally and internationally televised throughout South Korea, Philippines, China, and Japan.

== So The Arrow Flies ==
SO THE ARROW FLIES, written and performed by Esther Chae, is a political thriller about an alleged North Korean spy and the FBI agent who interrogates her. In his introduction, David Henry Hwang calls the play a "dazzlingly ambitious play, which explores nothing less than the identity of our world today." Written by award-winning actor Esther K. Chae, the solo performance play explores complex political and social issues including America's national security apparatus, global identity and gender roles through modern heroines.

The performance debuted at New York's Estrogenius Festival in 2007. Since then, it has been featured at TED conference, Ars Nova Theater (New York City), Cherry Lane Theater (New York City), World Women's Forum (Seoul, Korea), Edinburgh Fringe Festival (Scotland), October Nights Theater Festival (Imola, Italy), and educational institutions such as New York University, Wellesley College and City University of New York's Martin Segal Theater Center.

So the Arrow Flies (Book) Archived in Yale Library, Drama Collection in University of Washington's East Asian Library (2016)

Archived in Korea's National Assembly Library (2015)

Published by Dong-in Press, Korea (2015)

Published by No Passport Press (in English and Korean) (2014)

So the Arrow Flies (Stage Play) Library of Congress, Archive Collection (2012)

== Credits ==
=== Filmography and TV ===
Year	Title	Role	Notes
2000	Come On	Screenwriter and Lead Actor	Hampton's International Film Festival
2000	Becoming an Actress in New York City	Lead	Nominated – Asian American Ammy Award
2002	24	Mina	
2003	S.W.A.T	Reporter	
2003	The Shield	Donna	
2003	ER	Reporter Justine	
2003	The West Wing	McKenzie	
2004	ABC Micro Mini Series	Amy	AFTRA Best American Scene Award
2005	Esther Chae in Hollywood	Herself	Documentary nationally televised in South Korea
2005	Cinema AZN	Herself	Vision Award by The National Association for Multi-Ethnicity in Communications
2006	NCIS	Yoon Dawson	Episode "Light Sleeper"
2006	Night Stalker	Dae	
2007	Law and Order: Criminal Intent	Ms. Kim	
2008	The Young and the Restless	Dr. Che	
2011	Untitled Brenda Hampton Project (pilot)	Sarah	
2014	Almost Human	Korean Newscaster	
2015	Sisters	Party Girls	
2017	Guidance	Esther Park Jensen	
2018	Bosch	Aubrey Stenstrom	
2020	Soul	Miho (voice)	(credit only)

=== Theater ===
Year	Production	Location	Role	Notes
1999	Measure for Measure	Yale Repertory Theater	Juliet	
2001	Piano	Harvard/American Repertory Theater	Han	
2001	Pojagi: The Korea Project	La MaMa (New York)/Millenium Festival (South Korea)	Lead	Nominated – New York Obie Award Best Production
2005	Distant Shore	Kirk Douglas Theater/Mark Taper	Mina	
2007	Yellowface	Mark Taper Forum	Various (u/s)	
2006–2010	So The Arrow Flies	Edinburgh Fringe Festival (Scotland), Ars Nova Theater (New York), World Women's Forum (South Korea)	Creator and Lead	

=== Voice Over and miscellaneous ===
Year	Title	Role	Notes
2004	Team America: World Police	Voice/ADR	
2005	Stealth	Voice/ADR	
2005	Memoirs of a Geisha	Voice/ADR	
2009	Fast & Furious	Voice/ADR	
2010	Bones	Voice/ADR	
2011	Hall Pass	Voice/ADR	
2011	Thor	Voice/ADR	
2012	Total Recall	Voice/ADR	
2013	Battle of the Year	Voice/ADR	
2014	Gang Related	Voice/ADR	
2014	The Gambler	Voice/ADR	
2014	The Interview	Voice/ADR	
2015	Avengers: Age of Ultron	Voice/ADR	
2017	Criminal Minds: Beyond Borders	Voice/ADR	
2018	Black Panther	Voice/ADR	
2020	Over The Moon	Voice/ADR	
2020	Soul	Voice of Miho	

== Personal life ==
Chae is fluent in English and Korean, and knows some French and written Chinese. Chae is certified stage combatant, and is trained in Korean Drum and Mask dance. She summited Kilimanjaro (Tanzania, 5,895m) and trekked the Himalayan Mountains (India, 1400m) and Machu Picchu (Peru, 7,972m).

== Awards and recognition ==
- 2014 "Extraordinary Chambers" (Play) Nominated for 'Outstanding Dramatic Production' & 'Outstanding Ensemble' by San Diego Theater Critic Circle
- 2010 Asian American Trailblazer Award
- 2010 University of Michigan Emerging Artist Alumni Award
- 2009 TED Fellow
- 2009 Tanee Artist Recognition Award
- 2009 Durfee ARC Grant
- 2009 Asian Women's Giving Circle Grant
- 2009 Santa Fe Art Institute Screenwriting Fellow
- 2008 University of Southern California, Center for Asia Pacific Leadership
- 2008 NetKAL Fellowship
- 2007 Korean Wave Asian Star Award at the Asia Model Festival Awards
- 2006 Vision Award by The National Association for Multi-Ethnicity in Communications ("Cinema AZN"/International Channel)
- 2005 Producers Guild of America Film Development Workshop Fellow
- 2005 AFTRA Best American Scene Award ("Micro Miniseries"/ABC)
- 2005 Golden Reel Award, Best Radio Play ("Hiroshima" with Tyne Daly and Ruby Dee)
- 2001 Ammy Award for Asian Americans, Best Documentary Nominee ("Becoming an Actress in NYC")
- 2000 Obie Theater Award Nominee ("Pojagi"/Ping Chong and Co.)
