= Cote de Pablo =

Chilean-American actress

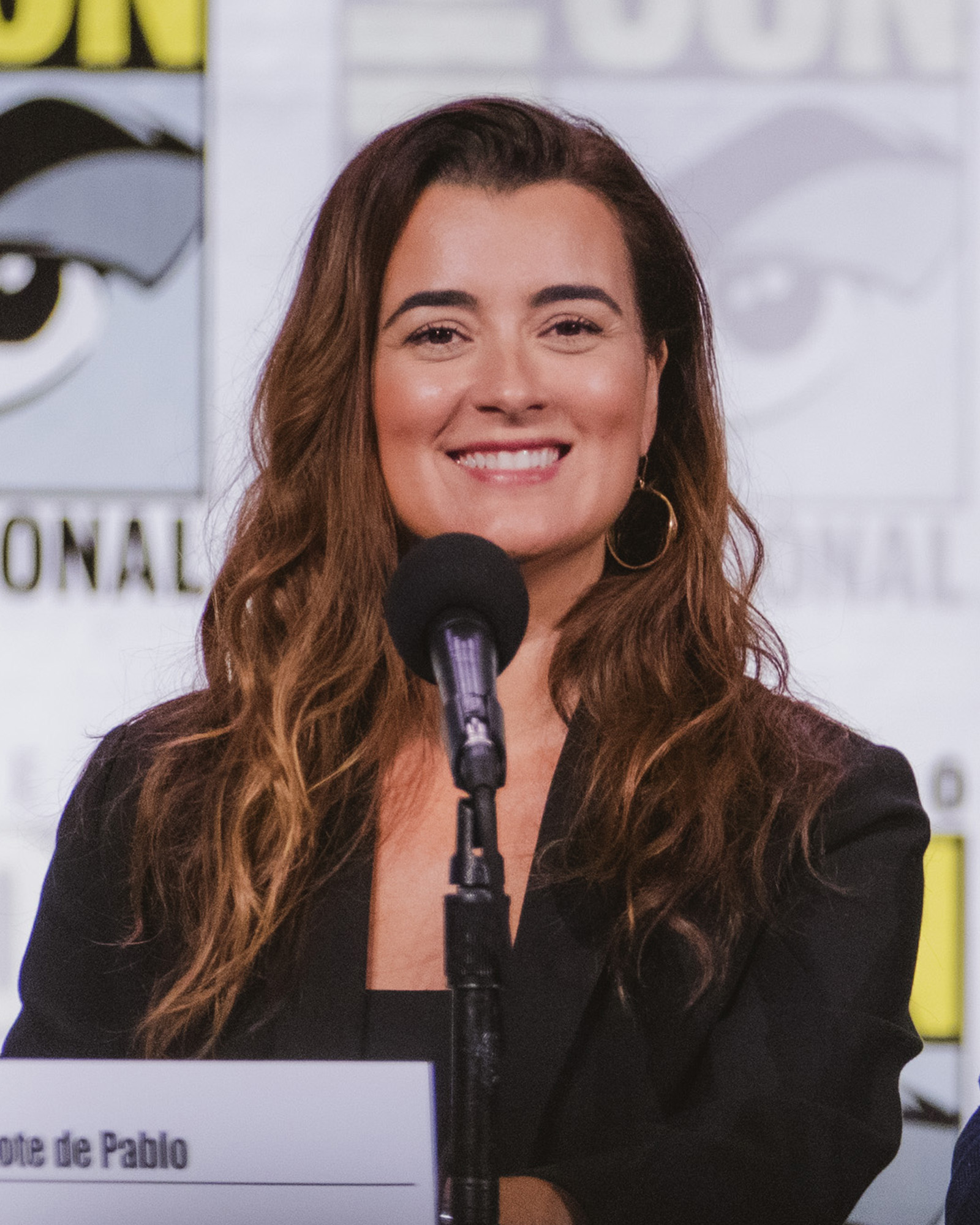
- De Pablo in 2025
- Born: María José de Pablo Fernández; November 12, 1979 (age 46); Santiago, Chile
- Education: Carnegie Mellon University (BFA)
- Occupation: Actress
- Years active: 1994–present
- Known for: Ziva David on NCIS and NCIS: Tony & Ziva
- Children: 1

María José de Pablo Fernández (born November 12, 1979), known professionally as Coté de Pablo, is a Chilean-American actress. Born in Santiago, Chile, she moved to the United States at the age of 10, where she studied acting.

De Pablo co-hosted episodes of the Latin-American talk show Control with former Entertainment Tonight host Carlos Ponce at the age of 15 before attending Carnegie Mellon University to study music and theater. After appearing in a number of television roles, she was cast to portray main character Ziva David in the CBS television series NCIS in 2005 and won an ALMA Award for the role in 2011.

== Early life ==
She was born on November 12, 1979 in Santiago, Chile, to Francisco de Pablo and María Olga Fernández. She has a younger sister, Andrea, and a brother, Francisco, who works as a DJ. When de Pablo was 10 years old, her mother took a job in Miami, Florida, at a Spanish-language television network. While there, de Pablo attended Arvida Middle School and New World School of the Arts, where she studied musical theater. In the fifth grade, she found many people could not pronounce her first name of "María José", so she asked them to call her "Coté", a common Chilean nickname for María José. De Pablo attended Carnegie Mellon University in Pittsburgh, Pennsylvania, where she studied drama and appeared in several plays, including And the World Goes 'Round, The House of Bernarda Alba, Indiscretions, The Fantasticks, and A Little Night Music. She graduated in 2000 with a Bachelor of Fine Arts in Drama.

== Acting career ==
=== Early roles ===
De Pablo began working in the entertainment industry at age 15, when she hosted some episodes of the talk show Control (1994–95) on Univision, alongside former Entertainment Tonight host Carlos Ponce.

After graduation, she moved to New York City to find work as an actress, working as a waitress in an Italian eatery in Brooklyn and doing babysitting to support herself. In 2000, she had roles in Fox's The $treet and the CBS-drama The Education of Max Bickford. She picked up parts in the New York City Public Theater, on the TV show All My Children, and in commercials. De Pablo played the role of Marguerite Cisneros in The Jury (broadcast on the Fox Network). The show was short-lived, screening only 10 one-hour episodes. In 2005, De Pablo was about to make her Broadway debut in The Mambo Kings as Dolores Fuentes, but the show closed after a short trial run in San Francisco.

=== NCIS ===
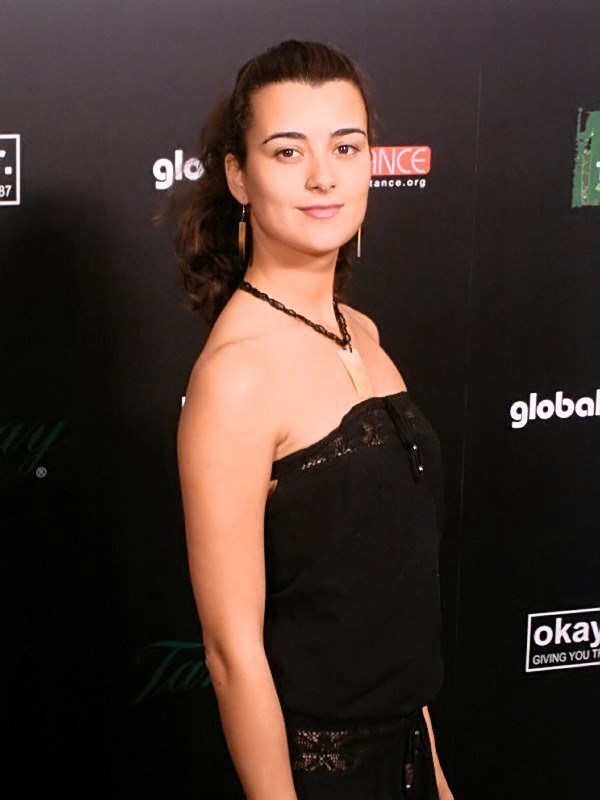
Cote de Pablo in 2007

De Pablo is primarily known for her portrayal of Ziva David, an Israeli Mossad officer turned NCIS agent, in the police procedural drama NCIS. She had submitted a videotape audition while waiting for The Mambo Kings to move forward and was asked to fly to Los Angeles for a screen test two days after it was canceled. Network executives arranged for her to act alongside series regular Michael Weatherly to test for chemistry during her second audition; he went off script by brushing her hair back and commenting, "You remind me of Salma Hayek". De Pablo's response to Weatherly was to stay in character and she "dismissed him completely". Afterward, producer Donald P. Bellisario met with her as she was waiting for a cab to take her back to the airport, telling her she had landed the part.

De Pablo described the character as "someone completely different from anyone else on the show because she's been around men all her life; she's used to men of authority. She's not afraid of men."

In 2006, she won an Imagen Award at the Imagen Foundation Awards for Best Supporting Actress in Television for NCIS. In 2008 and 2009, she was nominated for the same award. Also in 2008 and 2009, she was nominated for an ALMA Award for Outstanding Actress in a Drama Television Series. In 2011, de Pablo was nominated once again for an Imagen Award, but this time it was for Best Actress in Television, not Supporting Actress. She won the 2011 ALMA Award for Favorite Television Actress—Leading Role in Drama.

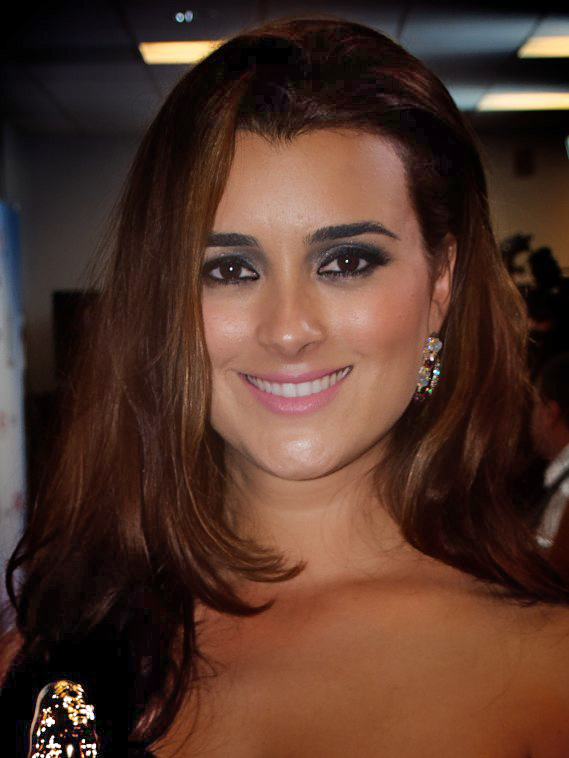
De Pablo at the 2011 ALMA Awards

On July 10, 2013, it was reported by CBS that de Pablo would be leaving NCIS for undisclosed reasons, although she remained long enough to conclude her character Ziva David's storyline at the beginning of season 11. Later, in a 2016 Q&A session, de Pablo stated that part of the reason why she left the show was because of the direction of her character's arc and feeling that the scripts were not good enough to make her stay.

De Pablo later told Cindy Elavsky that Ziva could come back because she did not die. However, in the season 13 finale of the series, it was stated that her character had apparently died in an explosion in Israel.

Three years later in 2019, the NCIS season 16 episode "She" revealed that Ziva is alive and has gone into hiding off-screen. De Pablo made a surprise unannounced return to the show in the last scene of the season 16 finale, which aired on May 21, 2019, in which Ziva arrives at Gibbs' basement to warn him that his life is in danger. Producers confirmed that de Pablo would appear in the first two episodes of the show's 17th season and then in the season's tenth and eleventh episodes as part of her storyline.

=== After NCIS ===
In 2014, de Pablo was cast in the film The 33, about the 2010 Copiapó mining accident, as the wife of one of the miners. She was also cast in the 2015 CBS miniseries The Dovekeepers, based on the Alice Hoffman novel. In March 2016, Deadline Hollywood reported de Pablo is slated to return to series television as Laura Kale in Syfy's thriller-drama, Prototype, pending negotiations. In April 2016, TVLine columnist Matt Mitovich confirmed de Pablo's return to series television. The show was to feature "three unlikely colleagues—two of them played by de Pablo and Jack Davenport—who inadvertently stumble upon an invention that challenges the very nature of quantum physics—a discovery which in turn puts their lives in grave danger." In August 2016, Deadline reported that Syfy passed on the show.

On August 28, 2018 Deadline announced that de Pablo and former NCIS castmate Michael Weatherly would be the executive producers of the upcoming CBS detective drama MIA, written by Shepard Boucher; however the series did not proceed to production.

In 2024, it was announced that de Pablo would reprise her role as Ziva David with on-screen love interest Michael Weatherly reprising his role as Tony DiNozzo in a new NCIS spin-off series called NCIS: Tony & Ziva on Paramount+.

In September 2025, the first three episodes of Tony & Ziva were made available on streaming services.

== Music ==
De Pablo performed a portion of Tom Waits' song "Temptation" on the NCIS episode "Last Man Standing", which first aired in the United States on September 23, 2008. Her full performance of the song, including some lyrics in French, appears on NCIS: The Official TV Soundtrack, which was released on February 10, 2009.

She is the singer in Roberto Pitre's Vivo en vida where she sings "Samba in Prelude" and "Cry Me a River". De Pablo was also featured on The 33's official soundtrack, singing "Gracias a la Vida".

== Personal life ==
De Pablo was in a long-term relationship with actor Diego Serrano as of 2010, but the relationship ended in June 2015.

In 2025, de Pablo revealed that she had become a mother.

== Filmography ==
Film and television roles
Year	Title	Role	Notes
1994–1995	Control	Co-host	Latin-American magazine show
2000	The $treet	Fiona	Episode: "Hostile Makeover"
2001	The Education of Max Bickford	Gina	Episode: "Do It Yourself"
2002	All My Children	Sally	1 episode
2004	The Jury	Marguerite Cisneros	10 episodes
2005–2013, 2019–2020	NCIS	Ziva David	Guest role (season 3, 16); Main role (season 3–season 11); Recurring role (season 17, 4 episodes); 194 episodes
2010	The Last Rites of Ransom Pride	Bruja	Film
2015	The 33	Jessica Vega	Film
2015	The Dovekeepers	Shirah	Miniseries
2016	Prototype	Laura Kale	TV movie
2019	Seneca	Celeste	Film
2025	NCIS: Tony & Ziva	Ziva David	Main role for 10 episodes; also executive producer,

=== Other Media ===
Year	Title	Role	Notes
2024	Off Duty: An NCIS Rewatch Podcast	Self	Co-hosted with Michael Weatherly and includes guest interviews with previous NCIS franchise cast members

Notes

Video game
Year	Title	Voice role	Notes
2002	TOCA Race Driver	Melanie Sanchez	

== Awards and nominations ==
Year	Association	Category	Work	Result	Ref.
2006	Imagen Awards	Best Supporting Actress in Television	NCIS	Won	
2008	Imagen Awards	Best Supporting Actress in Television	NCIS	Nominated	
2008	ALMA Awards	Outstanding Actress in a Drama Television Series	NCIS	Nominated	
2009	ALMA Awards	Outstanding Actress in a Drama Television Series	NCIS	Nominated	
2009	Imagen Awards	Best Supporting Actress in Television	NCIS	Nominated	
2011	Imagen Awards	Best Actress in Television	NCIS	Nominated	
2011	ALMA Awards	Favorite Television Actress—Leading Role in a Drama	NCIS	Won	
2012	ALMA Awards	Favorite TV Actress-Drama	NCIS	Nominated	
2016	Imagen Awards	Best Supporting Actress - Feature Film	The 33	Won	
2020	Imagen Awards	Best Supporting Actress in Television	NCIS	Nominated	
