= Christopher Maher =

American film and television actor (born 1955)

- Born: Maher Boutros; 1955 (age 70–71); Alexandria, Egypt
- Education: Neighborhood Playhouse School of the Theatre
- Occupations: Actor, chef
- Years active: 1978–present
- Spouse: Valerie
- Awards: James Beard Foundation
- Website: cookingstudiotaos.com

Christopher Maher (born as Maher Boutros; born 1955) is an Egyptian-American film and television actor, as well as a chef.

== Background ==
Born in Alexandria, Egypt, Maher's family moved to Toronto in the 1960s. He started pre-med studies but changed to acting at the University of Toronto. Arriving in New York in 1978, he studied acting further at the Neighborhood Playhouse School of the Theatre.

Maher worked at Tavern on the Green, where he met Drew Nieporent.

He broke into Entertainment with a year-long role as assassin Colonel Hashim on Another World.

== Career ==
=== Acting ===
In 1982, Maher moved to Los Angeles to pursue motion-picture roles. He changed his name from Maher Boutros to Christopher Maher. "I was typecast as a dumb Arab or a bad Arab, one or the other. It depressed me, and I just refused to do any more."

He has appeared in feature films and television episodes from Taxi and Hill Street Blues to Law and Order, 24, The West Wing and NCIS. He was in the film Olive, in which he starred with Gena Rowlands.

=== Cooking ===
Maher was also recognized by the James Beard Foundation as one of the great regional chefs of America and has cooked at the Beard House in New York City.

He runs a cooking school called "Cooking Studio Taos" plus natural and organic food venture in Taos. The food products are sold under the name "Caleb&Milo", named after their two sons. They sell their products in whole food markets and other gourmet markets.

== Personal ==
Maher lives in Taos, New Mexico, where he runs a cooking school called "Cooking Studio Taos" with wife Valerie

== Filmography ==
Year	Title	Role	Notes
1984	Best Defense	Sayyid, Landry's Tank Crew	
1987	Mannequin	Armand	
1989	Pucker Up and Bark Like a Dog	Emile	
1996	Executive Decision	Kahlil	
2002	Enough	Phil	
2004	The West Wing	Iranian ambassador	
2009	The Men Who Stare at Goats	Iraqi Driver	
2011	Olive	Cyrus	
