= List of NCIS cast members =

Below is a list of actors and actresses that are part of the cast of the American police procedural drama television series NCIS.

== Cast members ==
This table lists characters who have appeared in two, or more, episodes (excluding flashbacks) and the cast members who have portrayed them.

Character	Portrayed by	Season																							
Character	Portrayed by	1	2	3	4	5	6	7	8	9	10	11	12	13	14	15	16	17	18	19	20	21	22	23	24
Main cast
Leroy Jethro Gibbs	Mark Harmon	Main	Main	Main	Main	Main	Main	Main	Main	Main	Main	Main	Main	Main	Main	Main	Main	Main	Main	Main					
Leroy Jethro Gibbs	Sean Harmon (young) Micah Owens (young) (Note: Season 11)						R	R	R	R		R								R					
Caitlin Todd	Sasha Alexander	Main	Main	R					G (Note: Sasha Alexander reprised her role as Kate in an uncredited voice role in the season eight episode "A Man Walks Into a Bar...". Alexander did not appear in any new original material for the season nine episode "Life Before His Eyes" or the season twelve episode "The Lost Boys", only appearing using digitally manipulated CGI footage from the season two episode "SWAK" with the latter coming from the season one episode "Reveille".)	G			G												
Anthony DiNozzo	Michael Weatherly	Main	Main	Main	Main	Main	Main	Main	Main	Main	Main	Main	Main	Main								G			Main
Abby Sciuto	Pauley Perrette	Main	Main	Main	Main	Main	Main	Main	Main	Main	Main	Main	Main	Main	Main	Main									
Donald "Ducky" Mallard	David McCallum	Main	Main	Main	Main	Main	Main	Main	Main	Main	Main	Main	Main	Main	Main	Main	Main	Main	Main	Main	Main				
Donald "Ducky" Mallard	Adam Campbell (young)												G	G	G				G					G	
Timothy McGee	Sean Murray	R	Main	Main	Main	Main	Main	Main	Main	Main	Main	Main	Main	Main	Main	Main	Main	Main	Main	Main	Main	Main	Main	Main	Main
Ziva David	Cote de Pablo Gabi Coccio (young)			Main	Main	Main	Main	Main	Main	Main	Main	Main					G	R							
Jenny Shepard	Lauren Holly			Main	Main	Main				G (Note: Lauren Holly did not appear in any new original material for the season nine episode "Life Before His Eyes" as well as the season twelve episode "The Lost Boys", only appearing using digitally manipulated CGI footage from the season five episode "Judgement Day".)			G												
Leon Vance	Rocky Carroll					R	Main	Main	Main	Main	Main	Main	Main	Main	Main	Main	Main	Main	Main	Main	Main	Main	Main	Main	
Jimmy Palmer	Brian Dietzen	R (Note: Brian Dietzen was given guest star credits in seasons one through five, and "also starring" credits in seasons six through nine.)	R	R	R	R	R	R	R	R	Main	Main	Main	Main	Main	Main	Main	Main	Main	Main	Main	Main	Main	Main	Main
Ellie Bishop	Emily Wickersham											Main	Main	Main	Main	Main	Main	Main	Main					G	
Nick Torres	Wilmer Valderrama														Main	Main	Main	Main	Main	Main	Main	Main	Main	Main	Main
Alex Quinn	Jennifer Esposito														Main										
Clayton Reeves	Duane Henry													R	Main	Main									
Jack Sloane	Maria Bello															Main	Main	Main	Main						
Kasie Hines	Diona Reasonover															R	Main	Main	Main	Main	Main	Main	Main	Main	Main
Jessica Knight	Katrina Law																		R	Main	Main	Main	Main	Main	Main
Alden Parker	Gary Cole																			Main	Main	Main	Main	Main	Main
Family
Victoria Mallard	Nina Foch (Note: Season 2 & 3) Caroline Lagerfelt (Note: Season 14)		R	R											R										
Sarah McGee	Troian Bellisario		R		R																				
Kelly Gibbs	Mary Mouser (Note: Season 3 & 4) Brenna Radding (Note: Season 5) Sam Schuder (Note: Season 9) Mila Brener (Note: Season 13)			R	R	R				R				R											
Shannon Gibbs	Darby Stanchfield Aviva (young)			R		R	R	R		R															
Diane Sterling	Heather Scobie (Note: Season 4) Melinda McGraw				R					R	R	R	R				R								
Eli David	Michael Nouri Ben Morrison (young)						R	R	R		R														
Jackson Gibbs	Ralph Waite Rob Notron (young)						R	R	R	R	R	R													
Jackie Vance	Paula Newsome						R	R		R	R														
Jared Vance	Khamani Griffin (Note: Season 6) Akinsola Aribo						R			R	R	R													
Kayla Vance	China Anne McClain (Note: Season 6) Kiara Muhammad (Note: Season 9 - 12) Naomi Grace						R			R	R	R	R			R	R			R	R			R	
Anthony DiNozzo Sr.	Robert Wagner							R	R	R	R	R	R	R	R	R	R								
Breena Slater	Michelle Pierce							R		R		R	R							R					
Rachel Cranston	Wendy Makkena								R	R		R													
Kyle Davis	Daniel Louis Rivas									R	R														
Jake Malloy	Jamie Bamber												R	R											
NCIS and Navy employees
Tom Morrow	Alan Dale	R	R	R							R	R	R	R											
Gerald Jackson	Pancho Demmings	R		R																					
Bud Roberts	Patrick Labyorteaux	R													R	R									
Stan Burley	Joel Gretsch	R								R	R			R											
Paula Cassidy	Jessica Steen	R	R	R	R								R												
Chris Pacci	Tim Kelleher	R							R	R			R												
Cassie Yates	Tamara Taylor		R	R																					
Charles Sterling	Michael Bellisario			R																					
Cynthia Sumner	Stephanie Mello			R	R																				
Mike Franks	Muse Watson			R	R	R	R	R	R	R	R	R	R	R		R									
Michelle Lee	Liza Lapira				R		R																		
Nikki Jardine	Susan Kelechi Watson					R																			
Brent Langer	Jonathan LaPaglia					R	R																		
Chad Dunham	Todd Lowe						R																		
Phillip Davenport	Jude Ciccolella						R		R																
G. Callen	Chris O'Donnell						G														G				
Sam Hanna	LL Cool J						G														G		G	G	
Kensi Blye	Daniela Ruah						G															G			
Susan Grady	Jackie Geary							R	R			R													
Riley McCallister	Michael O'Neill								R	R															
E.J. Barrett	Sarah Jane Morris								R	R															
Simon Cade	Matt Willig								R	R															
Gayne Levin	Alimi Ballard								R																
Clayton Jarvis	Matt Craven								R	R	R														
Ned Dorneget	Matt Jones									R	R		R												
Jerome Craig	Greg Germann										R														
Sarah Porter	Leslie Hope											R	R	R											
Tony Francis	Tony Gonzalez												R		R										
Qasim Naasir	Rafi Silver												R		R										
Other agencies
Tobias Fornell	Joe Spano	R	R	R	R	R	R	R	R	R	R	R	R	R	R	R	R		R	R	R	R			
Faith Coleman	Alicia Coppola	R	R																						
Ron Sacks	Don Franklin			R	R																				
Hollis Mann	Susanna Thompson				R	R						R	R												
Trent Kort	David Dayan Fisher				R	R	R		R					R											
Michael Rivkin	Merik Tadros						R																		
Amit Hadar	Arnold Vosloo						R		R																
Danny Sportelli	Jack Conley							R		R						R									
Abigail Borin	Diane Neal							R	R	R	R	R	R												
Malachi Ben-Gidon	TJ Ramini							R	R																
Ray Cruz	Enrique Murciano								R	R															
Samantha Ryan	Jamie Lee Curtis									R															
Delilah Fielding	Margo Harshman											R	R	R	R	R	R		R	R	R	R	R		
Zoe Keats	Marisol Nichols												R												
Antagonists
Ari Haswari	Rudolf Martin	R	R	R						R															
Mamoun Sharif	Enzo Cilenti				R																				
René Benoit ("La Grenouille")	Armand Assante				R	R																			
Saleem Ulman	Omid Abtahi						R	R																	
Alejandro Rivera	Marco Sanchez							R	R			R				R									
Paloma Reynosa	Jacqueline Obradors							R	R																
Agah Bayar	Tamer Hassan								R	R			R												
Jonas Cobb	Kerr Smith								R																
Jonathan Cole	Scott Wolf									R															
Sean Latham	Philip Casnoff									R															
Harper Dearing	Richard Schiff									R	R														
Ilan Bodnar	Oded Fehr										R														
Paul Triff	French Stewart														R	R									
Gabriel Hicks	Graham Hamilton															R									
Other characters
Jeanne Benoit	Scottie Thompson				R	R								R											
Emily Fornell	Payton Spencer (Note: Season 4) Juliette Angelo				R							R	R	R	R		R		R						
Damon Werth	Paul Telfer					R		R																	
Leyla Shakarji	Tehmina Sunny							R	R			R													
Carol Wilson	Meredith Eaton							R		R		R								R			R		
Margaret Allison Hart	Rena Sofer							R																	
Dr. Cyril Taft	Jon Cryer													R											
Dr. Grace Confalone	Laura San Giacomo													R	R	R	R	R	R	R	R		R		
Jessica Shaeffer	Hilary Ward															R									
Phineas	Jack Fisher																	R	R						
Marcie Warren	Pam Dawber																		R	R					

== Crossovers ==
=== JAG ===
- Mark Harmon, Michael Weatherly, David McCallum, and Pauley Perrette all appeared in two episodes of season eight of JAG that served as a backdoor pilot.
- Patrick Labyorteaux appeared as his JAG character in three episodes of NCIS (one each in seasons 1, 14, and 15)
- John M. Jackson appeared as his JAG character in one episode of season ten of NCIS.
- Adam Baldwin appeared as his JAG character in one episode of season one of NCIS.
- Alicia Coppola appeared as her JAG character in three episodes of NCIS (one in season one and two in season two).

=== NCIS: Los Angeles ===
- Chris O'Donnell, Peter Cambor, Daniela Ruah, Barrett Foa, LL Cool J, and Brian Avers all appeared as their NCIS: Los Angeles characters in two episodes of NCIS' season six that served as a backdoor pilot.
- Rocky Carroll appeared in ten episodes of NCIS: Los Angeles as his NCIS character (seven in season one, and one each in seasons two, three, and six).
- Pauley Perrette appeared in two first-season episodes of LA.
- David Dayan Fisher appeared in one first-season episode of LA
- Michael Weatherly appeared in one seventh-season episode of LA
- Kelly Hu appeared in one episode of the seventh season of NCIS as her LA character.

=== NCIS: New Orleans ===
- Scott Bakula, Zoe McLellan, Lucas Black, and C. C. H. Pounder all appeared as their NCIS: New Orleans characters in two episodes of NCIS' season 11 that served as a backdoor pilot.
- Actors who appeared on the first season of NCIS: New Orleans as their NCIS characters include Diane Neal (three), Rocky Carroll (three), Pauley Perrette (one), Meredith Eaton (one), Joe Spano (one), David McCallum (one), Michael Weatherly (one), and Mark Harmon (one).
- Leslie Hope appeared in one second-season episode of NCIS: New Orleans as her NCIS character

== Guest stars ==
- Ray Abruzzo
- Jay Acovone
- Patrick J. Adams
- Tyrees Allen
- Laz Alonso
- Erich Anderson
- David Andriole
- John Asher
- Mackenzie Astin
- Sean Astin
- René Auberjonois
- Erick Avari
- Jack Axelrod
- Julian Bailey
- Adam Baldwin
- Bonnie Bartlett
- Michael Beach
- Gerry Becker
- Jason Beghe
- Julie Benz
- Brad Beyer
- Danielle Bisutti
- Claudia Black
- Lauren Bowles
- Katy Boyer
- Ciara Bravo
- Abigail Breslin
- Jason Brooks
- Richard Brooks
- Marcus Brown
- Millie Bobby Brown
- Sterling K. Brown
- Dylan Bruno
- Carlease Burke
- K Callan
- Matt Caplan
- Clare Carey
- Drew Carey
- Enrique Castillo
- Christina Chang
- Robert Cicchini
- Shelly Cole
- Misha Collins
- Jack Conley
- Erin Cottrell
- Christina Cox
- Jon Cryer
- Brett Cullen
- Merle Dandridge
- Josie Davis
- Catherine Dent
- Michael Des Barres
- Seamus Dever
- Keith Diamond
- Charles Durning
- Meredith Eaton
- Zac Efron
- David Eigenberg
- Chris Ellis
- Mike Erwin
- Al Espinosa
- Nasser Faris
- Sherilyn Fenn
- Alex Fernandez
- Louis Ferreira
- John Finn
- Sheila Frazier
- Jordan Garrett
- Michael Gaston
- Kathleen Gati
- Michael Gilden
- Sarai Givaty
- Iddo Goldberg
- Charles Gómez
- Julie Gonzalo
- Cameron Goodman
- Bruce Gray
- Jason Gray-Stanford
- Scott Grimes
- Gary Grubbs
- Stacy Haiduk
- Colin Hanks
- Melora Hardin
- Marcy Harriell
- Brad Hawkins
- Lance Henriksen
- Sandra Hess
- Torri Higginson
- Stephanie Hodge
- Charlie Hofheimer
- David Hoflin
- Alexandra Holden
- Josh Holloway
- Mark Holton
- Kelly Hu
- Jon Huertas
- Gregory Itzin
- Penny Johnson Jerald
- Anne-Marie Johnson
- Chris J. Johnson
- Vernee Watson-Johnson
- Asante Jones
- Adam Kaufman
- David Keith
- Sheila Kelley
- Alex Kingston
- Chaney Kley
- Eric Allan Kramer
- Jenya Lano
- Fredric Lehne
- Samm Levine
- Christopher Lloyd
- Karina Lombard
- Louise Lombard
- Michael Lowry
- Jamie Luner
- Scott MacDonald
- Vinicius Machado
- Marguerite MacIntyre
- Christopher Maher
- William Mapother
- Matt Malloy
- Jonathan Mangum
- Matthew Marsden
- Mercedes Masohn
- Suleka Mathew
- Merrick McCartha
- Kevin McClatchy
- Tom McCleister
- Gerald McCullouch
- Chris McGarry
- Kate McNeil
- Alex Meneses
- Dina Meyer
- Larry Miller
- James Morrison
- Glenn Morshower
- William R. Moses
- Kieran Mulroney
- Ben Murphy
- Jaime Murray
- Alex Nesic
- Bob Newhart
- Jaime Ray Newman
- Michelle Obama
- Peter Onorati
- Terry O'Quinn
- Erik Palladino
- Robert Patrick
- Amanda Payton
- Elizabeth Peña
- Sofia Pernas
- Paul Perri
- Rick Peters
- Ely Pouget
- Glen Powell
- Lawrence Pressman
- Lindsay Price
- Francesco Quinn
- Dominic Rains
- Ethan Rains
- David Ramsey
- Jim Rash
- Perrey Reeves
- Mercedes Renard
- Terry Rhoads
- Beth Riesgraf
- Leonard Roberts
- Mark Rolston
- Cristine Rose
- John Rosenfeld
- Gena Rowlands
- John Rubinstein
- Betsy Rue
- Tim Russ
- Leon Russom
- Vik Sahay
- Hilary Salvatore
- Susan Santiago
- Sam Sarpong
- Elena Satine
- Doug Savant
- Stelio Savante
- Paul Schulze
- Ashley Scott
- Rodney Scott
- Noah Segan
- Parry Shen
- W. Morgan Sheppard
- Jamey Sheridan
- Kent Shocknek
- Christopher Shyer
- Jocko Sims
- Marina Sirtis
- Haaz Sleiman
- Cotter Smith
- Forry Smith
- Nick Spano
- Gina St. John
- Corey Stoll
- Mathew St. Patrick
- Eric Stonestreet
- Tehmina Sunny
- Oleg Taktarov
- Barbara Tarbuck
- Iqbal Theba
- Brian Thompson
- Susanna Thompson
- T. J. Thyne
- Kenneth Tigar
- Noa Tishby
- Lily Tomlin
- Joe Torry
- Connor Trinneer
- Andy Umberger
- Steve Valentine
- Gloria Votsis
- Jonathan Wade-Drahos
- Lindsay Wagner
- Dee Wallace
- Amanda Walsh
- Audrey Wasilewski
- Norbert Weisser
- Michael Welch
- Michael Whaley
- Billy Dee Williams
- Kirk B.R. Woller
- Aloma Wright
- Kathleen York
- Bellamy Young
- Vincent Young
- Kirsten Zien
