= Enemies Foreign =

- NCIS episode
- Episode no.: Season 8 Episode 8
- Directed by: Dennis Smith
- Written by: Jesse Stern
- Original air date: November 16, 2010

Guest appearances
- Michael Nouri as Mossad Director Eli David; TJ Ramini as Mossad Officer Malachi Ben Gidon; Sarai Givaty as Mossad Officer Liat Tuvia; Arnold Vosloo as Mossad Officer Amit Hadar; Catherine Dent as Former NCIS Special Agent Whitney Sharp; Michael O'Neill as Former NCIS Special Agent Riley McCallister; Oren Dayan as Karif Yasin; Stan Ivar as Former NCIS Special Agent Ben Robinson; Leslie-Anne Huff as Hillary Lange; Alex Morris as Former NCIS Special Agent Kurt Nelson; Maura Soden as Former NCIS Special Agent Melora Koss

Episode chronology
← Previous "Broken Arrow"	Next → "Enemies Domestic"
- NCIS season 8

"Enemies Foreign" is the eighth episode of the eighth season of the American police procedural drama NCIS and the 170th episode overall. It originally aired on CBS in the United States on November 16, 2010. The episode is the first of a two-part story arc and continues the long-term storyline within the series of the complex relationship between protagonist Ziva (Cote de Pablo) and her father, Mossad Director Eli David (Michael Nouri). During the first installment, the NCIS team is assigned to protect Eli when he arrives in Washington D.C. for an inter-agency conference and must deal with three Palestinian terrorists who are attempting to assassinate him.

A number of recurring actors appeared in the episode to portray the Mossad officers, including TJ Ramini as Malachi Ben Gidon and Arnold Vosloo as Amit Hadar. Israeli actress Sarai Givaty was cast for a new role as Liat Tuvia, the officer who replaced Ziva on the Kidon unit.

The episode is written by Jesse Stern and directed by Dennis Smith. It was watched live by 19.43 million viewers.

== Background ==
NCIS follows a team of government agents who work for the Naval Criminal Investigative Service. The main cast includes Mark Harmon as team leader Leroy Jethro Gibbs, Michael Weatherly as Senior Agent Anthony "Tony" DiNozzo, Cote de Pablo as Mossad Liaison Officer turned NCIS Agent Ziva David, Pauley Perrette as Forensic Specialist Abby Sciuto, Sean Murray as Special Agent Timothy McGee, David McCallum as Autopsy Technician Donald "Ducky" Mallard, Rocky Carroll as NCIS Director Leon Vance, and Brian Dietzen as Medical Assistant Jimmy Palmer.

== Plot ==
In the opening scene, the team arrests a young woman on suspicion of espionage and terrorism. Shortly thereafter, they learn that she had only used an electronic device to steal credit card details from the actual terrorist. The investigation leads to Ziva's former team leader, Mossad Officers Malachi Ben Gidon (TJ Ramini), and replacement Liat Tuvia (Sarai Givaty). They inform her that her father, Director Eli David (Michael Nouri), is set to arrive in Washington D.C. to attend an NCIS conference. Ziva is at first incredulous, as Eli has not left Israeli soil in over a decade, but he appears the following day.

On learning that three Palestinian terrorists are planning an attempt on Eli's life, the NCIS team is designated to protect him during his stay in the United States. The assignment is complicated by Ziva and Eli's estrangement, though she asserts that she can operate as normal, a claim that Gibbs backs. Liat still questions this, and Ziva agrees to a practice exercise to determine if she is fit to defend her father.

Ziva later confronts Eli about his nonchalant attitude towards her ordeal in the desert and the prospect of his own death. He responds that the responsibility of his work renders him unable to allow his personal emotions to dictate his choices. He further reminds her that there had been a time when "things were different". The episode ends on a cliffhanger when, after an attack by the terrorists at the conference apparently fails, Vance and David go to a safe house. Gibbs cannot reach them on the radio and Officer Hadar is shown to be lying dead at the safe house.

== Production ==
=== Writing ===
In August, executive producer Shane Brennan was asked if the show would delve more deeply into the storyline surrounding Ziva's captivity and torture in Somalia that took place in the previous season. He did not directly address this but divulged, "In November sweeps, we dip again into a story that perhaps everyone thought was played out. It involves Ziva." A month later, Brennan stated that this would be brought about through the return of Ziva's father, Eli David, who had sent her on the suicide mission a year prior. Described as "an emotion-charged reunion", the two-part episode arc would reportedly "[reveal] much about the enigmatic Eli David, and one of the other team members". In an interview before the episode aired, Cote de Pablo (portraying Ziva), said, "It's a two-part episode where the whole Israeli team comes back from Israel, including Ziva's father. So obviously that's going to be a big thing for Ziva because she finally gets to confront her father for sending her away on, basically, what I would call a suicide mission. They get to see each other after all of that and there's conflict." She added that the episode "affects [Ziva's] relationship with her father" and that "People will have to watch to see exactly how, but maybe there will be an unspoken forgiveness between father and daughter."

=== Casting ===
Israeli actress Sarai Givaty was cast to depict Mossad Officer Liat Tuvia in Enemies Foreign and Enemies Domestic. Givaty's casting was reported in the Israeli news, and ADD agent Yaron Lichtenstein commented, "We are proud of Sarai for joining the agency's series of international success stories." Brennan elaborated on the character's role in the story arc, saying that Liat's presence would leave Ziva feeling replaced "personally and professionally". Givaty commented, "There's a bit of tension there, and it gets to high levels. But there's a good ending!" Jesse Stern remarked on the recurring appearance of Mossad agents within the series:

I love our Israelis. I love when they're right and I love when they're wrong and I love trying to figure out why they do things so differently from our Americans. And maybe that's an intercontinental curiosity since our five Israelis are played by people from five different countries, each of them bringing their own unique take, their own attitude to the set everyday. I'm grateful to all of them for taking the ball and running with it since I was barely on set this episode.

Michael Nouri returned to portray Ziva's father, Eli. Arnold Vosloo and TJ Ramini also appeared again to depict Mossad Officers Amit Hadar and Malachi Ben Gidon respectively.

=== Filming ===
Cote de Pablo divulged, "Stuff is going to be blowing up, and not only that, but it was a crazy episode to shoot because there were sooo many stunts for me. And so that was a little hard. I had a big fight sequence, I had to shoot a lot—there was a lot of gunfire—and there was one huge explosion in which a whole kitchen blows up and I'm in the middle of it! Needless to say it was fun, but incredibly challenging."

== Reception ==
Mandi Bierly from Entertainment Weekly wrote, "For viewers, however, those scenes of the joint NCIS-Mossad protection detail running through an ambush scenario in the hotel parking garage, Ziva confronting her father about why he wasn't begging her forgiveness for leaving her for dead in the desert, and the actual ambush itself, were the highlight of the episode." BuddyTV contributor Jacky Jackman enjoyed the Liat and Ziva's interactions and wrote, "The dynamics between the two women is interesting. Ziva extols her achievements with Mossad, but Liat has chops of her own."
