= Baltimore (NCIS) =

- NCIS episode
- Episode no.: Season 8 Episode 22
- Directed by: Terrence O'Hara
- Written by: Steven D. Binder
- Original air date: May 3, 2011

Guest appearances
- Brian Dietzen as Jimmy Palmer; Scott Grimes as Detective Danny Price; Sean Cullen as Police Major Frank Raimey; Chad Lindberg as Joey Peanuts; Ed O'Ross as Dao Huang; Tim Kelleher as NCIS Special Agent Christopher Pacci; Stefan Marks as Navy Lieutenant Ian Floyd; Jeff Skowron as Peter Sears; D. Elliot Woods as Detective; Nika Williams as Sapphire

Episode chronology
← Previous "Dead Reflection"	Next → "Swan Song"
- NCIS season 8

"Baltimore" is the 22nd episode in the eighth season, and the 184th overall episode, of the American crime drama television series NCIS. It first aired on CBS in the United States on May 3, 2011. The episode is written by Steven Binder and directed by Terrence O'Hara, and was seen by 17.87 million viewers.

In the episode, Special Agent Anthony DiNozzo must dig into his past as a detective with the Baltimore Police Department when his old partner is murdered, including his first meeting with Gibbs and the circumstances that lead DiNozzo to join NCIS. The episode also acts as a lead-in to the two that comprise the season finale, "Swan Song" and "Pyramid", when the suspected killer is finally revealed.

== Plot ==
The serial killer nicknamed the "Port to Port Killer" (last referenced in the prior episode "Two-Faced") strikes again, leaving his victim dressed in an Admiral's uniform at the Navy Lodge in Washington, D.C. Anthony DiNozzo (Michael Weatherly) is jolted to recognize the victim as Danny Price (Scott Grimes), his former partner in the Baltimore Police Department's homicide squad. Believing that the Port to Port Killer may be targeting DiNozzo, or the NCIS team as a whole, the team begins to concentrate on his time in Baltimore.

A series of flashbacks shows DiNozzo and Price working together in Baltimore. The two detectives first met Leroy Jethro Gibbs (Mark Harmon) when the latter came to Baltimore on an undercover assignment, linking a Navy officer to a money laundering scheme. Since Gibbs is undercover, the Baltimore detectives take the lead. When they finally arrest the money launderer, DiNozzo uncovers evidence that Price is corrupt and has been working with the launderer. DiNozzo confronts Price in secret, but is unwilling to expose him. Equally unable to continue working with him, DiNozzo considers quitting the police force, but Gibbs, impressed by his abilities, invites him to join NCIS. Price develops a drinking problem and is dismissed from the police a few years later.

In the present, Ducky (David McCallum) discovers a typo in his autopsy report about the details of the Port to Port Killer's previous victims that is reflected in Price's murder, indicating that a copycat killer is responsible. When DiNozzo retrieves his misplaced cell phone, he finds a voicemail from Price before he died, saying they need to talk. Price had realized that the money launderer never exposed him because there was a second, higher-ranking accomplice in the Department — his and DiNozzo's former captain, who killed Price to keep his corruption secret, then disguised his crime as an act by the Port to Port Killer, using details from Ducky's report, which had been emailed to the Baltimore Police by NCIS.

Gibbs and DiNozzo arrest the captain, but Ducky and Abby (Pauley Perrette) announce that they have a worse problem: the email alerting Ducky to the typo in his report did not come from Abby, as he first thought, but from the Port to Port Killer himself, who not only knows that NCIS is tracking him, but has access to their internal records and computer system.

== Production ==
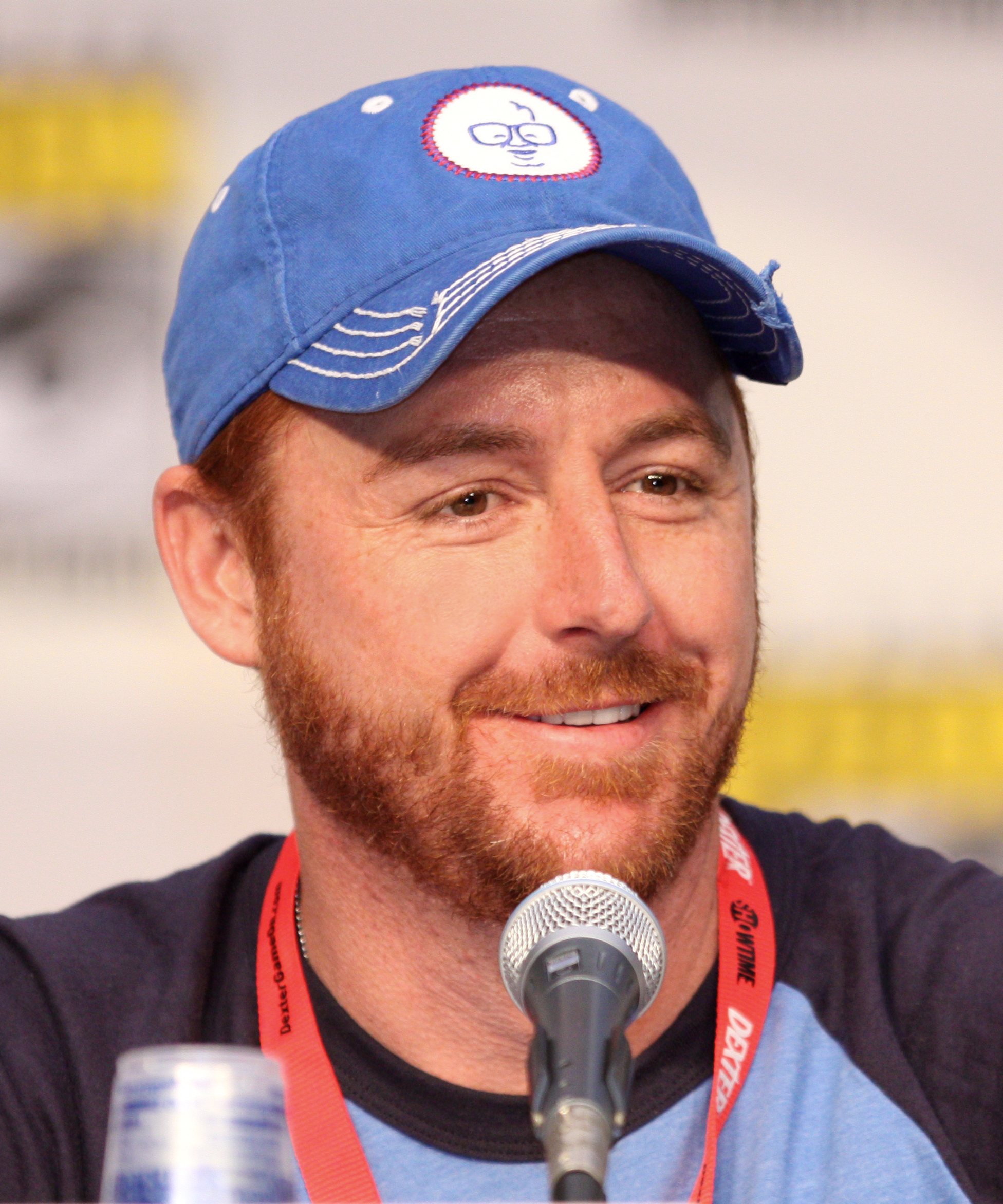
Scott Grimes guest starred as Tony's former colleague Danny Price.

The episode is written by Steven D. Binder and directed by Terrence O'Hara. Executive producer Gary Glasberg wanted to include and explain many little moments from NCIS' past. "So many little origin moments are sort of touched on, from Tony's wardrobe to the head slap. And it's fun, because there's nothing blatant about it. It's all very well structured and built into the mystery. And as you're going through the story, you find yourself going 'Wait a minute, they just explained one thing'. That was our goal, to come up with an origin story that presented all this information in as natural a way as possible — and sets up what Tony's and Gibbs' dynamic would be for the next decade".

According to Mark Harmon, Gibbs recruited DiNozzo after listening to his contributions during the case. "We did a scene [...], and every bit of the dialogue in the scene is a test, as far as Gibbs is concerned. He's listening the entire time to what Tony says. And the end of the scene depends on what he says. I mean, DiNozzo doesn't know that. But the scene ends the way it does because of what DiNozzo says, and because of Gibbs' belief in him. And from that, his gut instinct is that this kid is good". In connection with this, Gibbs' rule #5 is introduced: "Don't waste good", referring to DiNozzo wanting to quit. It's in this situation Gibbs' head slap is shown for the first time, which would be a trademark between them on NCIS. On how the head slap began back in Season 1 episode "The Curse": "It was totally spontaneous, though I've heard a lot of people claim it! Michael was doing his thing to a young Navy female petty officer on a ship, and it just seemed appropriate at the time to bring him back toward some sort of reality, which certainly the head slap did".

Tim Kelleher returns in a flashback as NCIS Special agent Christopher Pacci, a former colleague who was last seen in Season 1 episode "Dead Man Talking" where he was killed in the line of duty.

== Gibbs' rules ==
Rule number 5 and 35 are revealed for the first time in this episode:

- No. 5 "Don't waste good"
- No. 35 "Always watch the watchers"

== Reception ==
"Baltimore" was seen by 17.87 million live viewers following its broadcast on May 3, 2011, with an 11/17 share among all households, and a 3.7/11 share among adults aged 18 to 49. A rating point represents one percent of the total number of television sets in American households, and a share means the percentage of television sets in use tuned to the program. In total viewers, "Baltimore" easily won NCIS and CBS the night, while the spin-off NCIS: Los Angeles drew second and was seen by 14.16 million viewers. It also became the fourth largest ratings for the week it aired. Compared to last episode "Dead Reflection", "Baltimore" was down a bit in both viewers and adults 18–49.

Steve Marsi from TV Fanatic gave the episode 4.5 (out of 5) and stated that "it was a great nod to the fans, but still relevant to the present", and "episodes like this walk a fine line, but what could have been a head-slapping (and not in that affectionate Gibbs way) resolution was sold by the strong writing and acting". Julian Spivey from Examiner.com included "Baltimore" in his compile of the "10 greatest episodes of 'NCIS'" in January 2012, saying, "I don't think there has been another 'NCIS' character that has matured as much in the series' nine seasons as Michael Weatherly's Tony DiNozzo. When the writers give DiNozzo a meaty storyline, and they do a few times a year, Weatherly is at the top of his game as an actor. The 'Baltimore' episode from season eight is one of Weatherly's finest performances as it's an origins episode that shows how the brash Baltimore detective came to join Gibbs' NCIS team."
