= NCIS season 8 =

Season of television series

NCIS
- Season 8
- Season 8 U.S. DVD cover
- Starring: Mark Harmon; Michael Weatherly; Cote de Pablo; Pauley Perrette; Sean Murray; Rocky Carroll; David McCallum
- No. of episodes: 24

Release
- Original network: CBS
- Original release: September 21, 2010 – May 17, 2011

Season chronology
- ← Previous; Season 7 Next → Season 9

The eighth season of the police procedural drama NCIS premiered on CBS on September 21, 2010, and ended on May 17, 2011. The season maintained the time slot of the previous season, airing on Tuesdays at 8 pm for the entire season.

The season story arc involves Ziva's largely-unseen boyfriend, Ray, and the CIA continuing to meddle in NCIS's day-to-day workings. Notable events include the terrorism and internal affairs threat during the "Enemies" two-parter, and the arrival of another Major Case Response Team from Rota, Spain, the team that Tony was offered to be lead of in the beginning of season four. The season ends on a five-part story arc involving the Port-to-Port killer that menaced both teams.

== Cast and characters ==
=== Main ===
- Mark Harmon as Leroy Jethro Gibbs, NCIS Supervisory Special Agent (SSA) of the Major Case Response Team (MCRT) assigned to Washington's Navy Yard
- Michael Weatherly as Anthony DiNozzo, NCIS Senior Special Agent, Second in Command of MCRT
- Cote de Pablo as Ziva David, NCIS Probationary Special Agent
- Pauley Perrette as Abby Sciuto, Forensic Specialist for NCIS
- Sean Murray as Timothy McGee, NCIS Special Agent
- Rocky Carroll as Leon Vance, NCIS Director
- David McCallum as Dr. Donald "Ducky" Mallard, Chief Medical Examiner for NCIS

=== Also starring ===
- Brian Dietzen as Jimmy Palmer, Assistant Medical Examiner for NCIS

=== Recurring ===
- Joe Spano as Tobias Fornell, FBI Senior Special Agent
- Muse Watson as Mike Franks, retired Senior Special Agent for NCIS and Gibbs' former boss
- David Dayan Fisher as Trent Kort, CIA Agent
- Michael Nouri as Eli David, Mossad Director and Ziva's father
- Ralph Waite as Jackson Gibbs, Gibbs' father
- Jude Ciccolella as Phillip Davenport, departing Secretary of the Navy
- Arnold Vosloo as Amit Hadar, Mossad Officer
- Bruce Boxleitner as Vice Admiral C. Clifford Chase
- Robert Wagner as Anthony DiNozzo, Sr., Tony's father
- Diane Neal as Abigail Borin, CGIS Special Agent in Charge
- TJ Ramini as Malachi Ben-Gidon, Mossad Officer
- Jacqueline Obradors as Paloma Reynosa, leader of a Mexican drug cartel
- Wendy Makkena as Dr. Rachel Cranston, a psychiatrist and Caitlin Todd's sister
- Michael O'Neill as Riley McCallister, retired Senior Special Agent for NCIS
- Sarah Jane Morris as E.J. Barrett, NCIS Senior Special Agent
- Matt Willig as Simon Cade, NCIS Special Agent
- Alimi Ballard as Gayne Levin, NCIS Special Agent
- Matt Craven as Clayton Jarvis, new Secretary of the Navy
- Enrique Murciano as Ray Cruz, CIA Agent
- Tamer Hassan as Agah Bayar, NCIS target
- Kerr Smith as Jonas Cobb, NCIS target and killer of Mike Franks

=== Guest appearances ===
- Sasha Alexander as Caitlin Todd, deceased NCIS Special Agent who was killed by Ari Haswari
- Jason Beghe as Blake Martin
- Tim Kelleher as Chris Pacci, deceased NCIS Special Agent
- Meredith Monroe as April Ferris

== Episodes ==
No. overall	No. in season	Title	Directed by	Written by	Original release date	Prod. code	U.S. viewers (millions)
163	1	"Spider and the Fly"	Dennis Smith	Gary Glasberg	September 21, 2010	801	19.41
Part 4 of 4 : Following Jackson Gibbs' confrontation with drug cartel leader Paloma Reynosa (Note: Jacqueline Obradors as Paloma Reynosa) (in "Rule Fifty-One") Jackson is placed in NCIS protective custody at his son's house. A few months later, the death of a helicopter pilot embroils the team in the Reynosa Cartel's vendetta with Gibbs, making each team member a target. Paloma plays a game of cat and mouse with NCIS as she builds a new drug pipeline through the US, expanding her cartel's influence. Tensions erupt when Alejandro Rivera (Note: Marco Sanchez as Alejandro Rivera) from the Mexican Justice Department calls Abby on her bluff to send the report on the Pedro Hernandez murder and threatens her in front of Gibbs. Aware of his involvement in the Reynosa Cartel, NCIS leads Rivera into a trap at a safehouse, tricking him into thinking his sister Paloma is dead and those responsible are in protective custody. Rivera takes the bait and intends to exact revenge, but ends up fatally shooting his own sister. Meanwhile, Leon Vance, whilst putting the report implicating Gibbs in a place no one will find it, receives a mysterious text message from Eli David, Director of Mossad claiming "I found him".
164	2	"Worst Nightmare"	Tony Wharmby	Steven D. Binder	September 28, 2010	802	19.15
A teenage girl is kidnapped from her middle school on the Quantico marine base, prompting NCIS to investigate. The missing girl's grandfather Nicolas Mason, (Note: William Devane as Nicolas Mason) complicates matters when he arranges a ransom drop without informing NCIS. While the team are working to find out the identity of the kidnapper and motive, Gibbs is worried Mason will take the law into his own hands and potentially cause more damage. Meanwhile, three interns are assigned to NCIS; Abby is suspicious of hers after her last assistant Chip Sterling attempted to kill her (in Season 3, "Frame Up"), Palmer feels ineffective after Ducky bonds with his intern, and McGee must contend with an intern who shows no interest in law enforcement or field work at all.
165	3	"Short Fuse"	Leslie Libman	George Schenck & Frank Cardea	October 5, 2010	803	19.81
NCIS responds to an emergency phone call after Heather Dempsey, a Marine bomb technician, shoots and kills an intruder in her home. Dempsey initially claims she was alone at the time, but the team quickly finds evidence she was not. Her lover is revealed to be a senior FBI agent, the intruder a hitman. They learn that Dempsey's brother was shot and paralyzed by a man named Abbott in a gang war, and that the FBI lover recommended witness protection for him after he testified to escape jail time. Meanwhile, Tony is excited to be chosen as the face of NCIS' new recruitment campaign, but Director Vance decides Gibbs promotes the qualities NCIS is looking for more than Tony does.
166	4	"Royals and Loyals"	Arvin Brown	Reed Steiner	October 12, 2010	804	19.20
The team is involved in an international incident as they investigate the murder of an American petty officer whose case is connected with a Royal Navy ship. Complications ensue when someone tries to get the ship to depart before NCIS can properly investigate. They discover that the murder was over a large amount of stolen CIA money, used to pay off warlords and dictators in Afghanistan. At first, the team suspects that the Royal Navy liaison officer is responsible, but quickly find out that he is actually an MI6 agent who was framed for the theft.
167	5	"Dead Air"	Terrence O'Hara	Christopher J. Waild	October 19, 2010	805	19.41
The team investigates the death of a radio DJ and a naval officer who were both killed live on air, and their job becomes more difficult by the discovery of various suspects. While searching for the murderer, they inadvertently uncover a large domestic terrorist group composed mostly of wealthy homeowners living in a gated community. The terrorist group feel that America should be spending more money defending itself rather than on foreign wars, and attempted to recruit the DJ to their cause. When the DJ refused, they had him killed to silence him. The NCIS team raids the community and arrests all of the members, only to find out that they have something much more sinister planned.
168	6	"Cracked"	Tony Wharmby	Nicole Mirante-Matthews	October 26, 2010	806	20.18
The NCIS team investigate the death of a Navy researcher who was hit by a bus in the middle of a busy street. They are surprised to find that her entire body is covered in elaborate chemical formulae, but begin to suspect her death was nothing more than an accident after finding evidence that she was becoming increasingly paranoid. Meanwhile, Tony's latest fling causes trouble when she suggests role playing, but refuses to tell Tony what she has in mind. Her fantasy is later revealed to be Tony Manero from Saturday Night Fever, evidenced by a very uncomfortable Tony attempting to sneak out of the Navy yard in a white disco suit.
169	7	"Broken Arrow"	Arvin Brown	George Schenck & Frank Cardea	November 9, 2010	807	19.87
When investigating a murder of a former Navy Commander and friend of Vice Admiral Chase, the team stumbles across a piece of an old nuclear bomb that had been lost during the Cold War. Because the victim had connections to Tony's father, they track him down and question him. Eventually, much to Tony's annoyance, Gibbs recruits DiNozzo Sr. to use his contacts to infiltrate a private party attended by arms dealers.
170	8	"Enemies Foreign"	Dennis Smith	Jesse Stern	November 16, 2010	808	19.43
Part 1 of 2 : The team is designated to protect Eli David (Mossad Director & Ziva's father) during a NCIS conference. They must deal with three Palestinian terrorists trying to kill him. The episode ends on a cliffhanger when, after an attack by the terrorists at the conference apparently fails, Vance and David go to a safe house. Gibbs cannot reach them on the radio and Officer Hadar is shown to be lying dead at the safe house.
171	9	"Enemies Domestic"	Mark Horowitz	Jesse Stern	November 23, 2010	809	18.78
Part 2 of 2 : Gibbs arrives at the scene to find Hadar dead, Vance critically injured, and Eli missing. Eventually, the team tracks down Eli, who had gone into hiding to elude his assassins. They then deduce that the man who planted the bomb is an insider at NCIS. During the episode, Gibbs revisits Operation Trident, Vance's first job with NIS and when he met Eli David. Gibbs originally comes to the conclusion that Eli tried to have Vance killed during the op by tipping off his primary target: a Soviet operative called the Russian. When Eli is found, it is revealed that Vance and Eli had actually worked together during the op to stop the Russian and his hit team, which was the career builder for Vance.
172	10	"False Witness"	James Whitmore Jr.	Steven D. Binder	December 14, 2010	810	19.87
The NCIS team investigates the disappearance of a Navy Petty Officer who is the sole witness in an upcoming murder trial. Meanwhile, Ziva and McGee attempt to discover the reason for Tony's strange behavior.
173	11	"Ships in the Night"	Thomas J. Wright	Reed Steiner & Christopher J. Waild	January 11, 2011	811	21.93
Gibbs and the NCIS team partner with Coast Guard Investigative Service (CGIS) Agent Abigail Borin to investigate the murder of a Marine First Lieutenant on a dinner cruise. The team learns of the victim's wealth, opening up new lines of investigation. The victim was the heir of a multimillion dollar corporation, and was intending to use his ownership to turn the corporation into a charity organization.
174	12	"Recruited"	Arvin Brown	Gary Glasberg	January 18, 2011	812	21.09
A petty officer's recruitment session at a college fair comes to a fatal end, prompting the NCIS team to solve his murder. The team learns of the petty officer's homosexuality, leading Gibbs to classify the murder as a possible hate crime. Meanwhile, Ducky's predecessor at NCIS, Dr. Walter Magnus, (Note: Bob Newhart as Dr. Walter Magnus) pays a visit and reveals he is suffering from Alzheimer's disease and he was hoping that coming back to NCIS would help him regain his memories.
175	13	"Freedom"	Craig Ross Jr.	Nicole Mirante-Matthews	February 1, 2011	813	22.85
The team investigates the death of a marine, which reveals that his wife has been abused.
176	14	"A Man Walks Into a Bar…"	James Whitmore Jr.	Gary Glasberg	February 8, 2011	814	20.35
A naval commander is found dead in his rack aboard ship, apparently murdered. The NCIS team investigates while having to deal with mandatory psychological evaluations conducted by Dr. Rachel Cranston, who is eventually revealed to be the older sister of their former colleague and friend, Agent Caitlin Todd.
177	15	"Defiance"	Dennis Smith	George Schenck & Frank Cardea	February 15, 2011	815	19.40
A botched assassination attempt in Belgravia forces NCIS to protect the Defense Minister's daughter Adriana, who is studying in the U.S. While the team is busy guarding Adriana, Gibbs attempts to investigate the death of the Marine who was killed protecting the minister. Meanwhile, Adriana begins developing a crush on McGee, but she is suddenly kidnapped by two armed attackers. Furious at their failure, Vance orders the team to solve the case in 48 hours or he will take McGee and Dinozzo's badges.
178	16	"Kill Screen"	Tony Wharmby	Teleplay by : Steven D. Binder; Story by : Steven Kriozere	February 22, 2011	816	21.32
The discovery of some extracted teeth and dismembered digits in a purse results in an NCIS investigation when they are identified as belonging to a Marine. As the team tries to track down the killer, an investigator from an electronic security firm, Blake Martin (Note: Jason Beghe as Blake Martin) arrives, having traced the source of a number of computer hacks to NCIS. This makes McGee nervous as he had regularly illegally hacked into government computers under Gibbs' orders. The team manages to track down Maxine, (Note: Beth Riesgraf as Maxine / Max Destructo) who is the dead Marine's girlfriend and is an avid gamer and computer expert. The team tracks down the programmer responsible and shuts down his program, but he is found dead. Later, DiNozzo manipulates events to get McGee to start dating Maxine.
179	17	"One Last Score"	Michael Weatherly	Jesse Stern	March 1, 2011	817	19.21
NCIS discovers that one of its former investigative assistants found brutally stabbed to death was selling details for how to rob a warehouse full of valuable possessions.
180	18	"Out of the Frying Pan"	Terrence O'Hara	Teleplay by : Reed Steiner & Christopher J. Waild; Story by : Leon Carroll, Jr.	March 22, 2011	818	19.46
Director Vance has Gibbs and his team assigned to the case of a drug-addicted teenager accused of patricide. Gibbs begins to question Vance's motives when the NCIS team begin to find inconsistencies in the investigation that lead him to believe his suspect is innocent. Tensions between Gibbs and Vance – fuelled by budget cuts and re-assignments in previous episodes – come to a head when Vance admits the victim was a close friend.
181	19	"Tell-All"	Kevin Rodney Sullivan	Andrew Bartels	March 29, 2011	819	18.73
A dying message from a naval officer attached to the Defense Intelligence Agency leads Gibbs' team in search of a manuscript containing military information. As the team investigates further, they find the body of a murdered FBI agent, and discover that both victims were involved in the writing of a book exposing secret anti-terrorist operations. However, the team is forced to track down the anonymous author of the book when Navy intelligence officers destroy all copies of the book. With the author's help (who is also a former Marine Lieutenant who was discharged for a failed anti-terrorist operation), they manage to arrest an arms dealer who had stolen a shipment of military weapons, but find out that she wasn't the killer. Meanwhile, Gibbs gets an invitation to a wedding, and throws it in the bin. Tony spends the entire episode trying to figure out who it is from only to learn it was from one of his ex-wives (the same wife who married and divorced Fornell).
182	20	"Two-Faced"	Thomas J. Wright	Nicole Mirante-Matthews & Reed Steiner	April 5, 2011	820	19.40
Part 1 of 5 : The body of a seaman is found wrapped in plastic and doused with a hospital-grade cleanser, hallmarks of a serial killer known as the "Port-to-Port" killer who kills service personnel when they make landfall. Vance creates a task force to catch the killer, appointing Barrett as lead investigator as she had been tracking the killer since he struck in Rota, Spain. Tensions arise when Gibbs suspects Barrett and DiNozzo are sleeping together, compromising the loyalties of the team. Meanwhile, Ziva discovers her boyfriend Ray is a secret CIA liaison to NCIS and questions the entire nature of their relationship when she catches him in a lie. After several dead ends and the discovery of another victim (bringing the known total to five), the episode ends with Ziva and DiNozzo in a bar, discovering a human eyeball floating in a glass of gin and tonic sent by an unidentified patron.
183	21	"Dead Reflection"	William Webb	George Schenck & Frank Cardea	April 12, 2011	821	19.87
Part 2 of 5 : The Major Case Response Team investigates a murder in the Pentagon that was caught on camera. Complications arise when the killer himself is found dead in an apparent car accident, but Ducky claims it was impossible for him to have committed the murder that was caught on tape as he died two days earlier. The team discovers the real killer was using an advanced silicone mask to impersonate the deceased to tamper with evidence implicating him in a botched special forces mission. Meanwhile, after trying to figure out the mystery of the eyeball (from the previous episode "Two-Faced"), E.J. and Palmer discover that it can open the door to the Multiple Threat Assessment Center (MTAC) when scanned, leaving everyone including Gibbs and the team shocked at the revelation.
184	22	"Baltimore"	Terrence O'Hara	Steven D. Binder	May 3, 2011	822	17.87
Part 3 of 5 : Special agent Anthony DiNozzo must dig into his past as a cop with the Baltimore Police District when his old partner Det. Danny Price is murdered with the same M.O. as the Port-to-Port killer. In flash backs to an older murder case he and Price worked, it is revealed how he first met, and was recruited by, NCIS Special Agent Gibbs. Still trying to solve the mystery of the eyeball (from "Two-Faced"), Agent E.J. Barrett discovers that the name of the person matching the eye's retinal pattern in MTAC's access directory is marked "classified" but it is unclear who classified it.
185	23	"Swan Song"	Tony Wharmby	Jesse Stern	May 10, 2011	823	17.62
Part 4 of 5 : While chasing the Port-to-Port killer, NCIS is placed on high alert when evidence comes to light that he has infiltrated the Navy Yard and the NCIS office. They learn that his latest victim survived because somebody intervened and lost an eye in the process; the team's on-again, off-again enemy, Trent Kort. Kort names the Port-to-Port killer as Lt. Jonas Cobb, (Note: Kerr Smith as Lt. Jonas Cobb) the first member of a CIA assassination team who cracked under inhumane training. Kort was sent to locate Cobb and eliminate him. As the NCIS team close in on Cobb, they suffer a personal tragedy when Mike Franks is killed after attempting to apprehend him. Agent Barrett is then baited by Cobb into locating a witness to his last attack in Hawaiʻi, allowing Cobb to go after Barrett's teammates, NCIS Special Agents Gayne Levin and Simon Cade. Cobb shoots Levin and wounds Cade before struggling with Barrett. The episode ends with Cobb gaining the advantage over Barrett with Frank's .45 automatic pointed under Berrett's jaw.
186	24	"Pyramid"	Dennis Smith	Gary Glasberg	May 17, 2011	824	18.62
Part 5 of 5 : Having finally learned the identity of the Port-to-Port killer after the death of Mike Franks, Gibbs and his team prepare for the worst when he makes his final strike close to the heart of NCIS, leading Ziva into a trap. When Ziva is found by McGee, DiNozzo, Gibbs and Ray Cruz, she reveals that it was misdirection while the killer, Lt. Jonas Cobb, infiltrates NCIS to target the people he holds responsible for turning him into a killer as a part of "Operation Frankenstein": Leon Vance, Trent Kort and the SECNAV Phillip Davenport. Cobb escapes the NCIS office, taking Palmer and E.J. hostage to lure Davenport into a trap; he has also abducted Kort. Gibbs and Vance kill Cobb to free the hostages. "C.I. Ray" is summoned to Tel Aviv to deal with Kort. Cade goes home to heal, while E.J. steps down from her post, telling Tony's she's staying in D.C.. Davenport, in disgrace from the failure of "Frakenstein," resigns as SECNAV, paving the way for Clayton Jarvis to take his place. As his first act as the new SECNAV, Jarvis gives Tony a special assignment; find out who in Vance's NCIS organization is selling top-secret information, and to do so without informing anyone else at NCIS, including Gibbs and Tony's teammates.

== Ratings ==
Episode	Ratings			
Episode	Original airdate	Viewers (millions)	Rank	
Episode	Original airdate	Viewers (millions)	Night	Week
"Spider and the Fly"	September 21, 2010	19.41	1	2
"Worst Nightmare"	September 28, 2010	19.15	1	3
"Short Fuse"	October 5, 2010	19.81	1	2
"Royals & Loyals"	October 12, 2010	19.20	1	2
"Dead Air"	October 19, 2010	19.41	1	2
"Cracked"	October 26, 2010	20.18	1	2
"Broken Arrow"	November 9, 2010	19.87	1	3
"Enemies Foreign"	November 16, 2010	19.43	1	3
"Enemies Domestic"	November 23, 2010	18.78	2	4
"False Witness"	December 14, 2010	19.87	1	2
"Ships in the Night"	January 11, 2011	21.93	1	3
"Recruited"	January 18, 2011	21.09	1	5
"Freedom"	February 1, 2011	22.85	1	5
"A Man Walks Into a Bar... (NCIS)"	February 8, 2011	20.35	1	4
"Defiance"	February 15, 2011	19.40	1	3
"Kill Screen"	February 22, 2011	21.32	1	5
"One Last Score"	March 1, 2011	19.21	2	4
"Out of the Frying Pan"	March 22, 2011	19.46	1	4
"Tell-All"	March 29, 2011	18.73	2	5
"Two-Faced"	April 5, 2011	19.40	1	5
"Dead Reflection"	April 12, 2011	19.87	1	4
"Baltimore"	May 3, 2011	17.87	1	4
"Swan Song"	May 10, 2011	17.62	1	4
"Pyramid"	May 17, 2011	18.62	1	4

== DVD special features ==
- "I Have a Question For..." – Questions from the fans- The main NCIS cast answer fan questions.
- Technically Speaking – A conversation with Technical adviser Leon Carroll, Jr.- A talk with Leon Carroll Jr, a former agent with the real-life NCIS agency and also a technical adviser.
- Practical Magic: Turning Back Time on Director Vance- A behind-the-scenes feature on how the NCIS make-up team managed to create a younger version of Leon Vance played by Rocky Carroll.
- Lights! Camera! Weatherly! – Michael Weatherly directs an episode- A behind-the-scenes feature documenting how Michael Weatherly (NCIS Special Agent Anthony DiNozzo) made his directional debut by directing the Season 8 episode, "One Last Score".
- Grab Your Gear: A Look at Season 8 - A behind-the-scenes look at NCIS Season 8.
- Very Special Effects - A behind-the-scenes glimpse at the special effects and visual effects used during episodes of NCIS Season 8.
- Murder, They Wrote – The Writers talk about NCIS- Various NCIS writers discuss the episodes they've written during NCIS Season 8.
- Cast and Crew Commentaries on Selected Episodes (Region 1 and 2): Commentary on "Cracked" by Pauley Perrette and Tony Wharmby. Commentary on "Enemies Domestic" by Rocky Carroll, Jesse Stern and Mark Horowitz. Commentary on "A Man Walks Into a Bar..." by Mark Harmon, Gary Glasberg and James Whitmore, Jr. Commentary on "One Last Score" by Michael Weatherly and Mark Horowitz
