= Enemies foreign and domestic =

"Enemies, foreign and domestic" is a phrase out of the US oath of office. It may also refer to:

- "Enemies Foreign and Domestic", an episode of The West Wing (season 3)
- "Enemies Foreign" and "Enemies Domestic", a two-part episode of NCIS (season 8)
