= NCIS season 24 =

NCIS
- Season 24
- Starring: Sean Murray; Wilmer Valderrama; Katrina Law; Brian Dietzen; Diona Reasonover; Michael Weatherly; Gary Cole
- No. of episodes: 6

Release
- Original network: CBS
- Original release: October 6, 2026

Season chronology
- ← Previous; Season 23

The twenty-fourth season of the American police procedural television drama series NCIS was announced on January 22, 2026 by CBS, and it premiered on October 6, 2026.

This season features the return of Michael Weatherly as series regular since 2016, the 500th episode for Sean Murray (currently the series' longest-serving cast member) as well as Katrina Law and Gary Cole’s respective 100th episodes.

== Premise ==
NCIS revolves around a fictional team of special agents from the Naval Criminal Investigative Service, which conducts criminal investigations involving the United States Navy and Marine Corps. Based at the Washington Navy Yard in Washington, D.C., the NCIS team is led by Supervisory Special Agent Alden Parker, an ex-FBI Special Agent and a skilled investigator.

== Cast and characters ==
=== Main ===
- Sean Murray as Timothy McGee, NCIS Senior Special Agent, Second in Command of the Major Case Response Team (MCRT) assigned to Washington's Navy Yard
- Wilmer Valderrama as Nick Torres, NCIS Special Agent
- Katrina Law as Jessica Knight, NCIS Special Agent
- Brian Dietzen as Dr. Jimmy Palmer, Chief Medical Examiner for NCIS
- Diona Reasonover as Kasie Hines, Forensic Specialist for NCIS
- Michael Weatherly as Anthony DiNozzo, NCIS Director and former NCIS Senior Special Agent
- Gary Cole as Alden Parker, NCIS Supervisory Special Agent (SSA) of MCRT and former FBI Special Agent

=== Recurring cast ===
- Patrick Keleher as Mateo Garcia, McGee's son from a previous relationship
- Victoria Kelleher as Barbara Dunsley, NCIS Accountant
- Mary Cole as Aubrey the barista

=== Notable guests ===
- Seamus Dever as Gabriel LaRoche, newly appointed and subsequently fired NCIS Director
- Jillian Armenante as Helen Marsh, Secretary of the Navy (SECNAV)
- Mike O'Malley as Walt Keller, Torres' old undercover handler
- William Katt as Doctor. Katt cameoed towards the end of "Like and Subscribe".

== Episodes ==
No. overall	No. in season	Title	Directed by	Written by	Original release date	Prod. code	U.S. viewers (millions)
508	1	"Wayward Son"	Diana Valentine	Steven D. Binder & Christopher J. Waild	October 6, 2026	2401	6.45
Mateo is revealed to have grazed the arm of former NCIS agent Tony DiNozzo before fleeing. Tony explains to McGee and Torres that he is in D.C. to open a new office for his security firm Salus Mondiale; he only ran into Torres and Mateo following a hint from his colleague Boris regarding a planned hit on NCIS. New NCIS director Gabriel LaRoche clashes with the agents, forbidding them from investigating due to the personal ties to the case and firing Parker. It escalates into a mission to rescue SecNav Helen Marsh's daughter from kidnappers that had used Mateo for revenge after his search for his mother some months back. After recognizing that appointing LaRoche was a mistake following his handling of the case, Marsh reinstates Parker and his team and appoints Tony as the new NCIS director. Cast: Michael Weatherly rejoins in the main cast after ten years.
509	2	"Clean Slate"	Marc Roskin	Steven D. Binder & Christopher J. Waild	October 13, 2026	2402	5.92
As Tony's tenure as NCIS director begins, he gets involved with the MCRT team during a case which evolves from a dinner party gone wrong to a potentially massive infiltration of the US by long-term deep cover operatives. Knight is tasked by Ziva (who is living in Boston to keep an eye on Tali as she attends boarding school) to make sure Tony sticks to his diet; while Tony, refusing to evict McGee and Delilah from his former apartment, sleeps on Palmer's couch while looking for a new place. Tony confesses to McGee that he plans on getting involved with the team on a part-time basis in order to not let the stress of being an NCIS director completely consume him like it did to Vance. He also reveals that Marsh only passed McGee over for NCIS director because she wants McGee to succeed her as SecNav after she steps down in the future.
510	3	"Sleeping Dogs"	José Clemente Hernandez	Marco Schnabel	October 20, 2026	2403	6.20
McGee has breakfast with SecNav Marsh, who confirms that she is indeed vetting him as her possible successor after her tenure ends in two years' time. Torres is rattled when a hitman persona he had invented for deep undercover work 13 years ago, Dante Navarro, becomes linked to four recent murders in the city. Torres reconnects with his former handler, Walt Keller, who resents him for leaving undercover work behind to become a field agent. Keller realizes that the victims had previously testified against Baltimore mafia boss Sergio Cimino in exchange for new identities. After a fifth informant is killed before Torres and Keller can interrogate him, Keller rebukes Torres for refusing to admit that he enjoyed his undercover past and says that he thinks that NCIS has made Torres too "soft". One of Cimino's bookkeepers confesses to NCIS that he stole $10 million from Cimino and gave it to Keller; and Tony admits he has observed Keller making phone calls at odd hours, causing the team to believe Keller is the killer. However, upon viewing Keller's monthly payments to a woman, Torres recognizes her as the daughter of a bartender whose family he had promised to protect; he realizes that the bartender and his family had been murdered by the Ciminos and that the daughter is the real killer, committing the murders to avenge her family. Torres confronts Keller at the bar, who admits that he gave the daughter the money so that she could start a new life because he felt guilty for failing to protect her family, but that he has since come to realize that she is dangerous and he intends to arrest her. When the daughter shoots Keller, Torres tries to talk her down, but Keller shoots her dead to prevent her from firing her second weapon at Torres. A shaken Torres later visits Keller and asks him if a side undercover job offer with the CIA is still open.
511	4	"Like and Subscribe"	Tawnia McKiernan	Sydney Mitchel & Amy Rutberg	October 27, 2026	2404	5.98
512	5	"Speechless"	Marc Roskin	Scott Williams	November 10, 2026	2405	6.10
Cast: Michael Weatherly does not appear in this episode.
513	6	"Ride or Die"	James Whitmore Jr.	Andrew Bartels	November 17, 2026	2406	5.87
514	7	"Lucky Shot"	Michael Zinberg	Marco Schnabel & Rob Wright	December 1, 2026	2407	TBD
515	8	"The Chair"	Lee Friedlander	Christopher J. Waild	December 8, 2026	2408	TBD

== Production ==
The show was renewed for a 24th season by CBS on January 22, 2026.

On July 1, 2026 it was announced that former cast member Michael Weatherly would reprise his role as Tony DiNozzo for a season-long arc. On July 12, Weatherly revealed at a UK fan convention that season 24 will not retcon the events of Tony & Ziva. Full production of season 24 began on July 14.

The trailer for Season 24 was uploaded online on September 1, 2026.
