= One Last Score =

- NCIS episode
- Episode no.: Season 8 Episode 17
- Directed by: Michael Weatherly
- Written by: Jesse Stern
- Original air date: March 1, 2011

Guest appearances
- Brian Dietzen as Jimmy Palmer; Sarah Jane Morris as NCIS Special Agent Erica Jane 'E. J.' Barrett; Enrique Castillo as Ruleo Medilla; K Callan as Grace Mullen; Scott Lowell as Terry Thomas; Leonard Earl Howze as Security Guard Wilson; Jimmy Pinchak as Jason; Zoey Deutch as Lauren

Episode chronology
← Previous "Kill Screen"	Next → "Out of the Frying Pan"
- NCIS season 8

"One Last Score" is the 17th episode of the eighth season, and the 179th episode overall, of the American crime drama television series NCIS. Written by Jesse Stern and directed by Michael Weatherly, it originally aired on CBS on March 1, 2011, and was seen by 19.21 million viewers.

In the episode, the team must investigate the death of a former NCIS investigative assistant, while a new NCIS agent is coming back to the Navy Yard.

The episode marks the directing debut for Michael Weatherly, who also portrays Special agent Anthony DiNozzo on NCIS. It also introduces a new female NCIS agent, Special Agent Erica Jane Barret (Sarah Jane Morris), as a recurring character on the show.

== Plot ==
NCIS discovers that one of its former investigative assistants found brutally stabbed to death was selling details for how to rob a warehouse full of valuable possessions. They discover that the warehouse contains items seized from a former Navy officer (JoBeth Williams) who used a Ponzi scheme to cheat many people out of their money. While investigating the warehouse, the team finds that something hidden in one of her desks was stolen. In order to find the killer, Gibbs makes a deal with the officer to downgrade her sentence to house arrest in return for divulging his identity. However, it is a ploy by Gibbs to lure out the real killer, a robber who lost his money trying to launder it through the officer's accounts. The officer grabs her notebook containing the accounts where she hid her money and flees, technically breaking her house arrest agreement. Gibbs and Ziva swoop in, arresting both the killer and the officer while at the same time getting the evidence they needed to put her away for life. Meanwhile, budget cuts cause personnel to be reorganized in NCIS, including the transfer of the Spain team to Washington DC. Tony immediately becomes infatuated with the new team leader, who apparently returns his feelings.

== Production ==
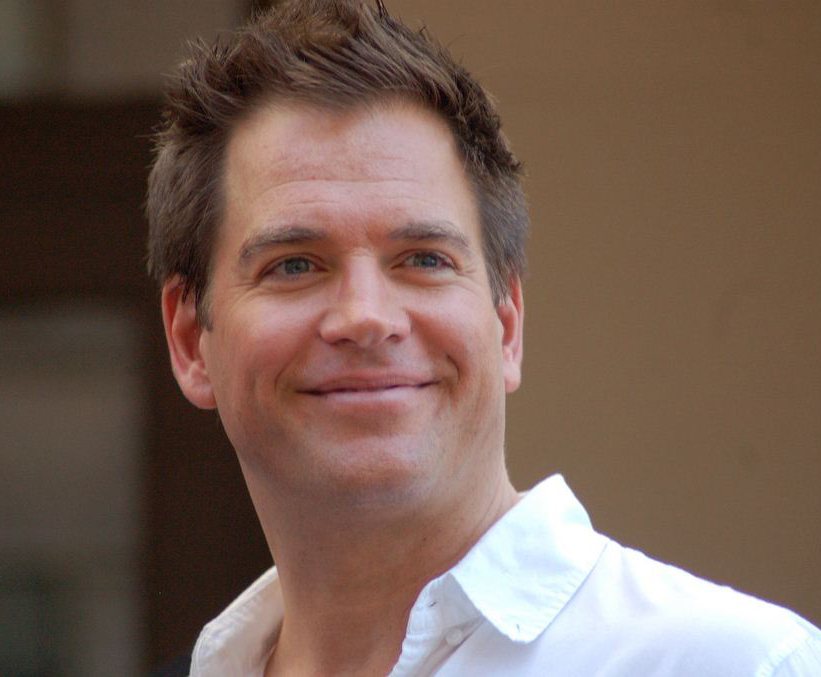
Michael Weatherly debuted as director in "One Last Score"

The episode is written by Jesse Stern and directed by Michael Weatherly. This is the first episode directed by Weatherly, who originally portrayed Special agent Tony DiNozzo on NCIS. "Believe me, I knocked on the door a long time". According to Weatherly himself, "it’s been a building interest. I’ve been really lucky to work with some really great film people in the past, but television works on a much quicker schedule, and it’s the TV directors I’ve worked with that I looked to and became a big fan of. I know I’m geeking about it a bit, but I just love the technical aspects of it all, and this was an incredible opportunity in a very safe environment". To begin with, Weatherly thought it would be an easy job to direct an episode. "Hey, I'm going to be there anyway, how hard can it be? It's very hard because as an actor [...] you flee the authority, but as a director you are the authority. It's a very tough job".

NCIS Special agent Erica Jane "EJ" Barret is introduced in this episode as a new recurring character. She is much like Tony's character, and did accept the job in Rota, Spain which Tony passed back in Season 4. "With the appearance of EJ, suddenly there’s a renewed spirit that Tony has always had in him – it’s what made him to go Africa and rescue Ziva with McGee. Sometime he acts like a goofball because that’s what people expect, but in this episode he comes away from that place".

== Reception ==
"One Last Score" was seen by 19.21 million live viewers following its broadcast on March 1, 2011, with an 11.7/18 share among all households, and a 3.8/11 share among adults aged 18 to 49. A rating point represents one percent of the total number of television sets in American households, and a share means the percentage of television sets in use tuned to the program. In total viewers, "One Last Score" made NCIS and CBS second for the night, only behind FOX's American Idol with 21.39 million. The spin-off NCIS: Los Angeles drew third and was seen by 15.67 million viewers. NCIS also got the fourth largest ratings for the week it aired. Compared to last week's episode "Kill Screen", "One Last Score" was down a bit in both viewers and adults 18-49.

Steve Marsi from TV Fanatic gave the episode 4.4 (out of 5) and stated that "if [Michael Weatherly] hadn't already left an indelible mark on NCIS in seven-plus seasons, [he] directed a compelling, unique and thoroughly entertaining episode Tuesday. Michael deserves praise all around, because while "One Last Score" was definitely unusual as NCIS episodes go, it was still terrific, well-acted and perfectly paced".
