= The Mystery of Natalie Wood =

2004 TV film

- Based on: Natasha: the Biography of Natalie Wood by Suzanne Finstad; Natalie & R.J. by Warren G. Harris
- Written by: Elizabeth Egloff
- Directed by: Peter Bogdanovich
- Starring: Justine Waddell; Michael Weatherly; Matthew Settle; Colin Friels; Elizabeth Rice and Alice Krige
- Theme music composer: Richard Marvin
- Countries of origin: United States; Australia
- Original language: English

Production
- Producers: Richard Fischoff; Randy Sutter
- Cinematography: John Stokes
- Editor: Scott Vickrey
- Running time: 172 minutes

Original release
- Network: ABC
- Release: March 1, 2004

The Mystery of Natalie Wood is a two-part 2004 made-for-TV biographical film directed by Peter Bogdanovich. Partly based on the biographies Natasha: the Biography of Natalie Wood written by Suzanne Finstad and Natalie & R.J. written by Warren G. Harris, the film chronicles the life and career of actress Natalie Wood from her early childhood in 1943 until her death in 1981.

== Plot ==
=== Part 1 ===
The film begins on November 28, 1981, on Catalina Island, California, where 43-year-old Natalie Wood (Justine Waddell) falls off her yacht, Splendour, and drowns. Flashing back to 1943, five-year-old, then named Natasha (Grace Fulton), grows up in a violent household in Santa Rosa, California. Her overbearing mother, Maria Gurdin (Alice Krige), is obsessed with making her daughter a film star. When a film is shooting in town, Maria arranges a role for Natasha. She kills a butterfly in order to get Natasha to cry on cue. Her performance impresses the director, Irving Pichel (John Noble), and a year later she reluctantly moves to Hollywood to start her career. Her mother dictates every career move, and gives her a new name: Natalie Wood. In 1946, Natalie is working on three films at a time, and is not allowed to enjoy spare time with her friends. Three years later, teenage Natalie (Elizabeth Rice) is unable to prevent her neglected older half-sister, Olga (Leanne Simic), from leaving home. While working on the set of The Green Promise, Natalie breaks her wrist. Fearing that her daughter will lose roles if she has it treated, Maria rejects medical help. Natalie's wrist does not heal properly as a result.

While in high school, 15-year-old Natalie falls in love with classmate Jimmy Williams (Jason Smith), and starts to rebel against her mother. Afraid that Natalie will get pregnant, Maria manipulates Natalie into breaking up with Jimmy. Jimmy shoots himself in a suicide attempt. Heartbroken, Natalie severs all ties with her mother. By the mid-1950s, she (Waddell) and her friend Margaret O'Brien (Sophie Mentis) decide that Natalie should play the female lead in Rebel Without a Cause opposite James Dean (Nick Carpenter). In order to get the role, she allows herself to be seduced by director Nicholas Ray (Robert Taylor). Ray does not cast her initially, but her involvement in a car accident caused by Dennis Hopper (Jarrod Dean), changes his mind. Simultaneously, she auditions for director Roy Tremaine (Andy Rodoreda) to please her mother; he rapes her. Fearful for her career, she does not report the crime. She focuses on Rebel, which is a great success. Natalie achieves stardom and becomes romantically involved with many Hollywood men. Worried about her many boyfriends, Maria arranges a date with Robert Wagner (Michael Weatherly), an actor whom Natalie has adored since she was a child.

Shortly before they are married, Natalie promises her mother that she will not have children with Robert, even though she wants to do so. By 1959, she distances herself from Robert and regularly meets with a therapist to discuss her troubled childhood and her frustrated desire for motherhood. Meanwhile, she works on Splendor in the Grass in New York City with Elia Kazan (Christopher Pate). The film requires nudity, and she becomes upset when her malformed wrist is exposed for the first time. Another scene requires her to swim, forcing her to confront a traumatizing fear of drowning instilled in her by her mother. She eventually overcomes her fear and celebrates with her co-star Warren Beatty (Matthew Settle). Wagner becomes jealous of her interaction with other men. While filming West Side Story, Robert announces that he wants a divorce because he never sees Natalie anymore; he is also jealous of her rise to stardom.

=== Part 2 ===
The film continues to reflect on her marriage with Robert Wagner, as well as her relationship with Warren Beatty. Natalie's nightmare of drowning comes true, when in 1981 she falls off a boat and drowns in the freezing water.

== Cast ==
- Justine Waddell as Natalie Wood
  - Elizabeth Rice as Teenage Natalie Wood
  - Grace Fulton as Young Natalie Wood
- Michael Weatherly as Robert Wagner
- Matthew Settle as Warren Beatty
- Colin Friels as Nick Gurdin
- Robert Taylor as Nicholas Ray
- Alice Krige as Maria Gurdin
- Malcolm Kennard as Christopher Walken
- Christopher Pate as Elia Kazan
- John Noble as Irving Pichel
- Barry Langrishe as Jack L. Warner
- Steven Vidler as Richard Gregson
- Sophie Monk as Marilyn Monroe
- Nathalie Roy as Lana Wood
- Jason Smith as Jimmy Williams
- Nick Carpenter as James Dean
- Lewis Fitz-Gerald as Dr. Thayer
- Rupert Reid as Henry Jaglom
- Paul Pantano as Sal Mineo
- Stephen Anderton as Dennis Davern
- Rachael Taylor as Maryann Marinkovich
- Nikki Osborne as Jackie Estes
- Mark Lee as William Russell
- Leanne Simcic as Olga Tatuloff
- Andy Rodoreda as Roy Tremaine
- Jeremy Cumpston as John Payne
- Amanda Crompton as Marilyn Wayne
- Jarrod Dean as Dennis Hopper
- Sophie Mentis as Margaret O'Brien
- David Baldwin as William Goetz
- Patrick McGrath as Edmund Gwenn
- Brett Sheerin as Charlie
- Paul Barry as Robert Vaughn
- Rachel Scobie as Joan Collins
- Phillip Lye as Joseph L. Mankiewicz
- Inga Romantsova as Gypsy Lady

== Production ==
Director Bogdanovich was initially reluctant to produce a biopic, because he was unsatisfied about being the subject of a biopic himself, in Star 80 (1983). He explained: "I didn’t know if I wanted to do it, because I knew the people a little bit. I’d met Natalie a few times, nodded at her at parties, and same thing with Robert Wagner. I also knew I didn’t like being portrayed in the films about Dorothy Stratten. But then I decided: Somebody’s gonna do this, and I thought I’d be more sensitive because of my experiences. Besides, by then I had fallen in love with Natalie and her work. In Love With the Proper Stranger, Inside Daisy Clover, This Property Is Condemned, her performances are brilliant, really brilliant. I realized she was really underrated as an actress — and that, up until then, I had been one of the people who underrated her."

Parts of the film were shot around the Palm Beach area in New South Wales, Australia. The film was shot in early 2003.

== Reception ==
Slate magazine called the film a "standard" production, and criticized Bogdanovich for using real-life interview footage in the film: "Bogdanovich layers in archival material like newspaper headlines and stills of the real Wood, as well as talking-head interviews with her surviving relatives and friends, a choice that brings little to the proceedings, since whatever stories the witnesses tell are subsequently presented in painfully literal tableaux." Its reviewer praised the cast, though, for its performances: "Justine Waddell is competent and appealing; she's no Judy Davis, but she avoids the biopic trap of overly mannered impersonation. Indistinguishable Ken dolls Michael Weatherly and Matthew Settle offer uncanny vocal impressions of Robert Wagner and Warren Beatty, while Alice Krige (Star Trek's Borg Queen) is perfect as Maria, Natalie's monstrous, self-mythologizing Russian mother, who pulls the wings off butterflies to get little Nat to cry on cue."
