= NCIS season 21 =

NCIS
- Season 21
- Season 21 U.S. DVD cover
- Starring: Sean Murray; Wilmer Valderrama; Katrina Law; Brian Dietzen; Diona Reasonover; David McCallum; Rocky Carroll; Gary Cole
- No. of episodes: 10

Release
- Original network: CBS
- Original release: February 12 – May 6, 2024

Season chronology
- ← Previous; Season 20 Next → Season 22

The twenty-first season of the American police procedural television drama series NCIS was announced on February 21, 2023, by CBS, and premiered on February 12, 2024, and concluded on May 6, 2024. This is the first season not to feature David McCallum (as Dr. Donald "Ducky" Mallard), who died on September 25, 2023, though he is still posthumously credited in the first two episodes. Due to the 2023 Writers Guild of America and SAG-AFTRA strikes, the season consists of only 10 episodes, the smallest number in the show's history, shorter even than season 18, which was shortened due to the COVID-19 pandemic in the United States. This season also includes the 1,000th episode of the entire NCIS franchise, which aired on April 15. The previous season finale and this season's premiere episode were broadcast nine months apart, making it the longest break in the series's history.

On April 9, 2024, CBS renewed the show for a 22nd season.

== Premise ==
NCIS revolves around a fictional team of special agents from the Naval Criminal Investigative Service, which conducts criminal investigations involving the United States Navy and Marine Corps. Based at the Washington Navy Yard in Washington, D.C., the NCIS team is led by Supervisory Special Agent Alden Parker, an ex-FBI Special Agent and a skilled investigator.

== Cast and characters ==
=== Main ===
- Sean Murray as Timothy McGee, NCIS Senior Special Agent, Second in Command of the Major Case Response Team (MCRT) assigned to Washington's Navy Yard and NCIS Acting Director
- Wilmer Valderrama as Nick Torres, NCIS Special Agent
- Katrina Law as Jessica Knight, NCIS Special Agent
- Brian Dietzen as Dr. Jimmy Palmer, Chief Medical Examiner for NCIS
- Diona Reasonover as Kasie Hines, Forensic Specialist for NCIS
- David McCallum as Dr. Donald "Ducky" Mallard, NCIS Historian and former Chief Medical Examiner (episodes 1–2; credit only due to McCallum's death in 2023)
- Rocky Carroll as Leon Vance, NCIS Director
- Gary Cole as Alden Parker, NCIS Supervisory Special Agent (SSA) of MCRT and former FBI Special Agent

=== Recurring cast ===
- Joe Spano as Tobias Fornell, Private Detective and former FBI Senior Special Agent
- Margo Harshman as Delilah Fielding-McGee, DoD Intelligence Analyst and McGee's wife
- J. Claude Deering as Curtis Hubley, NCIS Technical Operator

=== Crossover ===
==== NCIS: Hawaiʻi ====
- Vanessa Lachey as Jane Tennant, NCIS Special Agent in Charge

==== NCIS: Los Angeles ====
- Daniela Ruah as Kensi Blye, NCIS Special Agent

=== Special guest star ===
- Michael Weatherly as Anthony DiNozzo, former NCIS Senior Special Agent

=== Notable guests ===
- Al Sapienza as Maurice Riva
- Kim Matula as former FBI Agent Rose
- Michael Garza as Reymundo De Leon
- Chris Petrovski as Lev Trotski
- David Starzyk as Allan Berger, US councilman
- Chris McKenna as Eric Webb, former NCIS agent turned CIA agent
- Jake Thomas as Derek Bailey, Navy Petty Officer
- Russell Wong as Feng Zhao, NCIS Special Agent in Charge and Knight's father
- T. J. Thyne as Fletcher Voss, CEO of Bandium
- Spence Moore II as Jared Vance, Vance’s son
- Christina Kirk as Dr. Clara Logan
- Tim Russ as Dr. Erik Harper
- Alastair Duncan as Ron Davenport

== Episodes ==
No. overall	No. in season	Title	Directed by	Written by	Original release date	Prod. code	U.S. viewers (millions)
458	1	"Algún Día"	Diana Valentine	Christopher J. Waild	February 12, 2024	2101	7.32
The FBI arrests Torres for the murder of Maurice Riva, the man who tormented Torres's family when he was a child. They realize he was covering for his sister who he presumed had killed him upon hearing her voicemail saying "algún día", their family code for getting justice. Torres had beaten up Riva but kept from shooting him. The episode ends with Parker receiving a frantic phone call from Palmer.
459	2	"The Stories We Leave Behind"	Michael Zinberg	Brian Dietzen & Scott Williams	February 19, 2024	2102	7.43
Palmer visits Ducky the morning after he had called to discuss an old case that was recently brought up to him again, only to find that Ducky has died in his sleep. Prior to his death, he was helping a young woman uncover the truth behind scathing accusations against her father (a Marine veteran) by a councilman who is running for Senate. After the case is solved, the team recalls fond memories of Ducky, and Tony DiNozzo shows up to pay his respects and offer words of comfort to Palmer. Note: This episode was dedicated to David McCallum, who died on September 25, 2023, five months before this season premiered. Final episode to feature McCallum on the opening credits.
460	3	"Lifeline"	Rocky Carroll	Marco Schnabel	February 26, 2024	2103	7.00
Parker introduces "Walk-a-Mile" day to give the team insight on other departments, putting McGee in the auto garage, Torres in accounting, Knight in janitorial services, and Kasie in dispatch. The latter takes a call from a mysterious man in trouble, and the team soon learns he is a former agent.
461	4	"Left Unsaid"	Daniela Ruah	Yasemin Yilmaz	March 4, 2024	2104	6.91
A Petty Officer who was working on classified documents is seemingly kidnapped during his third attempt at a marriage proposal. The case leads the team to the officer's father, a big-name businessman who had no idea of his existence and is in a rush to pay the ransom to try and get his son back.
462	5	"The Plan"	Lionel Coleman	Katherine Beattie & Chad Gomez Creasey	March 25, 2024	2105	6.15
An undercover agent from the far east office is found murdered and his handler, special agent in charge Feng Zhao, who happens to be Knight's father, assists in the investigation that culminates in the disappearance of bioweapons. Meanwhile, Knight deals with some family drama as it is revealed that she had never told her father about her relationship with Palmer. Also, McGee discovers via a DNA test that he has a half-sister he never knew of beforehand.
463	6	"Strange Invaders"	Claudia Yarmy	Gina Gold & Aurorae Khoo & Steven D. Binder	April 1, 2024	2106	5.90
A Navy pilot is murdered in an unusual fashion, and evidence points the team towards a possible alien invasion. The investigation leads to something far more sinister when put in the wrong hands. Meanwhile, McGee reveals that Delilah wants his facial hair shaved and sets up an online poll for the team to vote.
464	7	"A Thousand Yards"	Diana Valentine	Christopher J. Waild	April 15, 2024	2107	6.70
Director Vance is shot while visiting his late wife's gravestone, and the investigation eventually reveals that the entire agency is a target for revenge because of a case Gibbs worked on years earlier that involved Air Force One. Meanwhile, while recovering, Vance attempts to reconcile with his son, Jared, over the former's reasons of wanting to stay as the NCIS director. Note: This episode is the 1,000th episode of the entire NCIS franchise.
465	8	"Heartless"	Michael Zinberg	Sydney Mitchel & Brendan Fehily	April 22, 2024	2108	6.29
The team looks for a motive behind the kidnapping and death of a famous heart surgeon (Tim Russ). Meanwhile, Torres reveals he and Parker are in a two-on-two basketball tournament, only for Parker to show up with a stiff neck.
466	9	"Prime Cut"	Diana Valentine	Teleplay by : Marco Schnabel; Story by : Chad Gomez Creasey & Marco Schnabel	April 29, 2024	2109	6.66
When the remains of a Marine captain are found, Knight and Torres travel to Texas to find the suspected killer. Meanwhile, Delilah hires a home renovation reality TV star to redo the McGee kitchen, much to Tim’s annoyance.
467	10	"Reef Madness"	José Clemente Hernandez	Scott Williams	May 6, 2024	2110	6.84
Vance tells Knight that she is being offered a job as chief of training for the REACT team; while Palmer, who has already suffered through losing Gibbs and Ducky, threatens to break up with Knight if she takes the job. Meanwhile, the team investigates when three bodies are found on a Navy ship that is about to be retired and turned into artificial reef. Knight and Parker get trapped when a suspect locks them in.

== Production ==
On February 21, 2023, NCIS was renewed for a twenty-first season, which premiered on February 12, 2024. The production of the season was delayed due to the WGA and SAG-AFTRA strikes in the United States.

David McCallum, who played Dr. Donald "Ducky" Mallard in the show's first 20 seasons, died on 25 September 2023. The second episode of the season paid tribute to him with various clips from past episodes to celebrate Ducky's life and memories with the team, as well as the appearance of former cast member Michael Weatherly, with DiNozzo showing support to Palmer moments before the funeral.

On January 5, 2024, it was announced that NCIS: Los Angeles star Daniela Ruah would be directing an episode this season, later revealed to be episode 4, titled "Left Unsaid".

On March 14, 2024, it was revealed that both Ruah and Vanessa Lachey would make an appearance as Kensi Blye and Jane Tennant, respectively, in the 1,000th overall episode of the franchise, though neither Kensi nor Jane appeared “in person” alongside the D.C. team.

== Ratings ==
Viewership and ratings per episode of NCIS season 21
No.	Title	Air date	Rating/share (18–49)	Viewers (millions)	DVR (18–49)	DVR viewers (millions)	Total (18–49)	Total viewers (millions)
1	"Algún Día"	February 12, 2024	0.5/5	7.32	—N/a	4.18	—N/a	11.50
2	"The Stories We Leave Behind"	February 19, 2024	0.5/6	7.43	—N/a	—N/a	—N/a	—N/a
3	"Lifeline"	February 26, 2024	0.4/5	7.00	—N/a	—N/a	—N/a	—N/a
4	"Left Unsaid"	March 4, 2024	0.5/5	6.91	—N/a	—N/a	—N/a	—N/a
5	"The Plan"	March 25, 2024	0.4/4	6.15	—N/a	—N/a	—N/a	—N/a
6	"Strange Invaders"	April 1, 2024	0.4/4	5.90	—N/a	—N/a	—N/a	—N/a
7	"A Thousand Yards"	April 15, 2024	0.4/5	6.70	—N/a	—N/a	—N/a	—N/a
8	"Heartless"	April 22, 2024	0.4/5	6.29	—N/a	—N/a	—N/a	—N/a
9	"Prime Cut"	April 29, 2024	0.4/4	6.66	—N/a	—N/a	—N/a	—N/a
10	"Reef Madness"	May 6, 2024	0.4/4	6.84	—N/a	—N/a	—N/a	—N/a
