= Tim Kelleher (actor) =

American writer, actor and director

- Born: January 9, 1956 (age 70); The Bronx, New York, U.S.
- Occupations: Writer; actor; director
- Years active: 1989–present
- Spouse: Billie Livingston (m. 2008)

Tim Kelleher is an American writer, actor and director.

== Biography ==
=== Early life ===
Born in the Bronx, Kelleher grew up across the five boroughs of New York City, including Staten Island. After college he entered the Maryland Province of the Society of Jesus (Jesuit). After the novitiate, he chose to return to New York and train as a stage actor, studying under Robert Patterson.

=== Career ===
With friends, Kelleher founded the Colony Theatre and served as its artistic director, staging the work of new playwrights as well as classics. His acting career has included guest appearances on numerous TV shows, and a turn as the resident villain on NBC's sci-fi series Dark Skies. Kelleher‘s more than two dozen film credits include Malcolm X, Operation Dumbo Drop, Independence Day, The Negotiator, Thirteen Days, Flash of Genius, Seven Pounds and Inception.

Kelleher directed the short-form film The Skell, and in 2008, he wrote and directed Wake-Up Call, a pilot that did not go to series.

=== Personal life ===
Kelleher is married to Canadian novelist Billie Livingston. Religion has remained an interest of his and in 1995 he was received into the Ukrainian Greek Catholic Church. In keeping with his faith, in 2011 he wrote and produced The Creed: What Christians Profess, and Why it Ought to Matter, a documentary film for First Things magazine featuring scholars and thinkers. He also serves as new media editor for First Things, where he writes on topics related to religion, politics and culture. In 2019, he was ordained a deacon in the Ukrainian Orthodox Church.

== Filmography ==
Film
Year	Title	Role	Notes
1988	The Understudy: Graveyard Shift II	Duke / Larry	
1989	Blue Vengeance	Detective	
1989	Black Rain	Bobby	
1991	Late for Dinner	Man at Catering Truck	
1992	Malcolm X	Cop at Harlem Station #3	
1993	Teenage Mutant Ninja Turtles III	Raphael	Voice
1994	Terminal Velocity	Jump Junkie #1	
1995	Operation Dumbo Drop	C-123 Pilot	
1995	Clockers	Narc #2	
1995	Never Talk to Strangers	Wabash	
1996	The Birdcage	Waiter in Club	
1996	Executive Decision	Bulldog	
1996	Independence Day	Technician	
1998	Desperate Measures	Helicopter Shooter	
1998	The Negotiator	Argento	
1999	Made Men	Deputy Conley	
2000	Thirteen Days	Ted Sorensen	
2003	Matchstick Men	Bishop	
2008	Flash of Genius	Charlie Defao	
2008	Seven Pounds	Stewart Goodman	
2010	Inception	Thin Man	
2011	NCIS	Chris Pacci	season 8, episode 22: "Baltimore"
