= Anthony DiNozzo =

Fictional character from television series NCIS

Anthony DiNozzo Jr.
- NCIS character
- Michael Weatherly as Anthony DiNozzo Jr in a screencap from the NCIS season 2 premiere episode, "See No Evil".
- First appearance: "Ice Queen" (JAG)
- Portrayed by: Michael Weatherly; Tanner Stine (young DiNozzo)
- Voiced by: Adam Epstein (NCIS: The Video Game)

In-universe information
- Alias: Tony DiNardo (during an undercover mission with Jenny Shepard)
- Gender: Male
- Occupation: NCIS Director; Senior Field Agent (former); Police Detective (former)
- Family: Anthony D. DiNozzo Sr. (father); Unknown Paddington (mother; deceased)
- Significant other: Ziva David
- Children: Tali DiNozzo (daughter; with Ziva David)
- Relatives: Clive Paddington (uncle; deceased); Crispian Paddington (cousin); Vincenzo DiNozzo (uncle)
- Nationality: American

Career at NCIS
- Position: NCIS Director; Former Very Special Agent
- Rank: NCIS Director; Former Senior Field Agent
- Years of service: c. 2001/2002–2016, 2026
- Born: July 8, 1972

Anthony D. "Tony" DiNozzo Jr. (/dɪˈnoʊzoʊ/) is a fictional character in the CBS series NCIS, portrayed by Michael Weatherly. Created by Donald P. Bellisario, he appears as the senior field agent on Leroy Jethro Gibbs’ team for the first thirteen seasons, known for his charm, pop-culture humor and investigative skill. Early reception was mixed due to his chauvinistic behavior, though the character grew more positively received over time.

DiNozzo departs the series in season thirteen after learning he has a daughter with Ziva David, who is believed to have died. Weatherly later made a cameo in the season 21 episode "The Stories We Leave Behind" and subsequently reprised the role alongside Cote de Pablo (who played Ziva) for the spin-off NCIS: Tony & Ziva.

DiNozzo returns as the new Director of NCIS in the season 24 premiere, “Wayward Son,” initially helping the team with an investigation while opening a Washington, D.C., office for his private security firm. At the end of the episode, he is appointed Director of NCIS.

== Character creation and casting ==
Michael Weatherly was cast for the role of Anthony DiNozzo in 2003. Series creator Don Bellisario related the events that led to Weatherly being selected:

I liked him from the first moment I met him. I first met him in Australia, where he was doing The Natalie Wood Story [sic] [the movie is actually called The Mystery of Natalie Wood], and he was playing R.J. and the agents called me, or the casting director called me, and said, "I would like you to meet Michael Weatherly." And I was on my last day down there, and I said, "Yeah, I'm going home tomorrow. You know, I'll meet him when he comes back to the States. I'm going out to dinner with my family tonight. I just don't have the time." I received a phone call from Michael, and Michael knows how to flatter you. He started off by saying, "Oh, I love Magnum, P.I...." And then he started telling me all the things he knew about Magnum. And I said, "Look, if you want to go to dinner with me and my wife and two of my boys, you're welcome." Well, that ended up to be a three-hour dinner. It might have gone longer. I liked him so much that I cast him in the show after that meeting.

On another occasion, Bellisario stated, "I can't say enough about Michael Weatherly...He started out on NCIS [playing] a character who was just very unlikable to some women because he was just such a chauvinist, and he has gradually over the [seasons] changed—taken his character and softened it."

Weatherly said that he had initially been reluctant to join a JAG spin-off and explained, "But I went and had this dinner with Don Bellisario in Australia and his personality, his storytelling and his presence and everything kind of won me over." He later commented, "I got very lucky with Don Bellisario. He directed two of the first three episodes, and he really pushed me to try things and experiment and some of the wacky comedy came out of that. And it was kind of unexpected and I didn't really know what I was going to find."

At another point, Weatherly said, "It's kind of fun to play a total dinosaur in terms of sexual politics... The shallow end of the philosophical pool is obviously where Tony paddles around." In the same interview, actress Cote de Pablo (who portrays character Ziva David) added, "There's something deeper about that character. We always talk about the superficial element and the things that make us laugh. But he wouldn't be doing what he does if he wasn't really good at it. He's a complex character, and that's why people love him."

Weatherly directed his own performance of the character in the 2011 episode "One Last Score" and the 2013 episode "Seek". In 2016, the character was written out of the series due to Weatherly having tired of the grind of production, stating that he felt "like a circle that had gone all the way around and I really felt happy with the resolution of character and my time on the show".

== Fictional character background ==
Anthony DiNozzo is the senior field agent of the fictional Major Case Response Team (MCRT) led by Leroy Jethro Gibbs (Mark Harmon) a former Marine Gunnery sergeant. The team investigates major crimes involving military personnel, often dealing with local law enforcement officers (LEOs). A former police detective, he is characterized as an outgoing, joking, charismatic former jock and frequent lothario. His charisma helps him do undercover work and to deal with intra-agency conflicts. He often leads the team's crime scene investigations. Over the course of the series, he carries a few storylines, including an undercover assignment that goes through seasons four and five to catch an international arms dealer. DiNozzo provided some comic relief for an otherwise serious drama, regularly spouting movie trivia, especially in the early seasons, and as a Casanova, his dating provided many roguish experiences. The death of agent Caitlin Todd and DiNozzo's relationship with agent Ziva David become fundamental to his subtle shift in attitude and character development.

=== Fictional work history ===
At the end of his 2-year run with the Baltimore Police Department's homicide division, he was hired by NCIS in 2001 after discovering that his partner, Danny Price, was a dirty cop. According to Season 1, episode 6 "High Seas", prior to his time at Baltimore PD, DiNozzo worked for the Philadelphia and Peoria Police Departments.

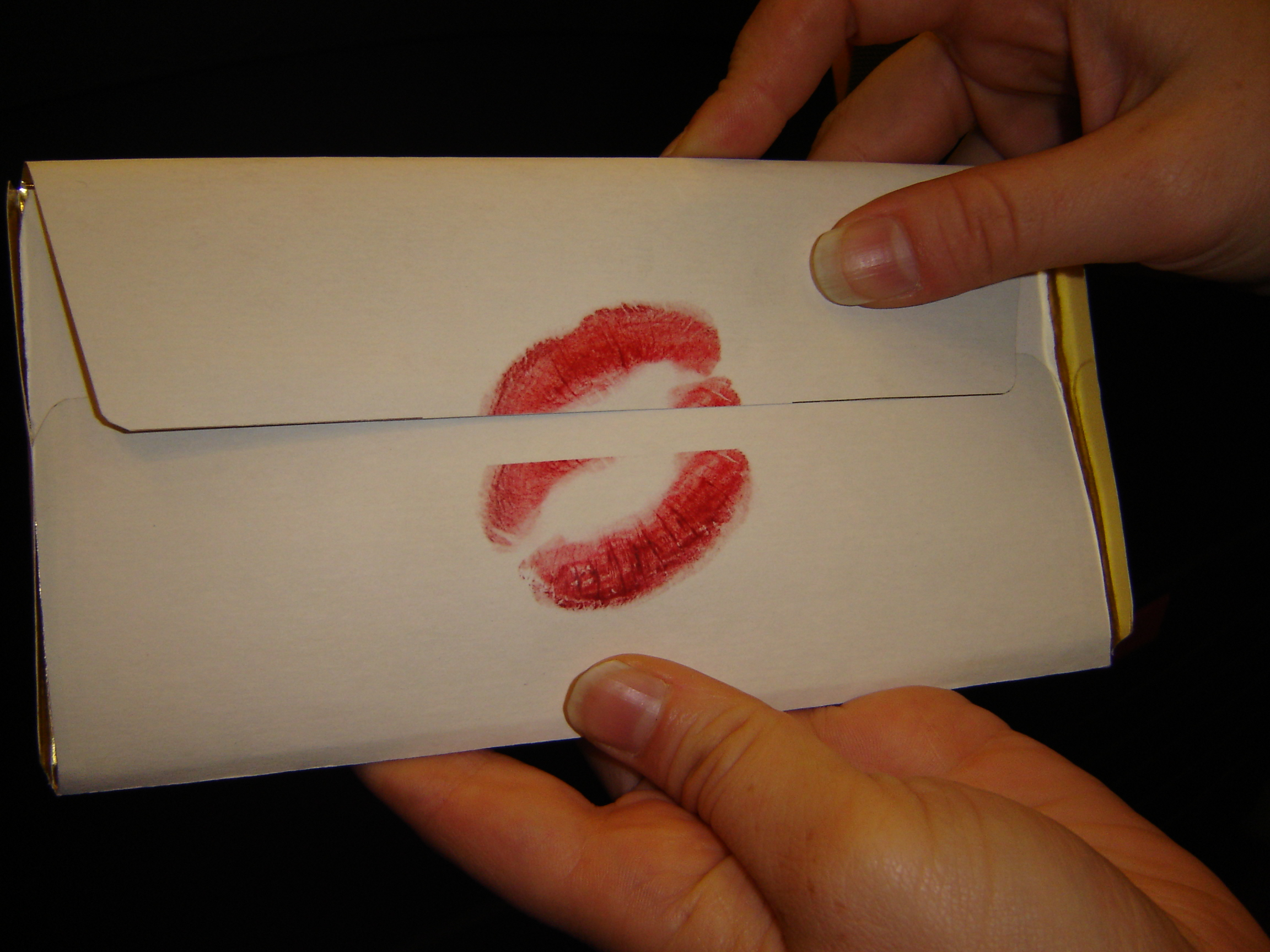
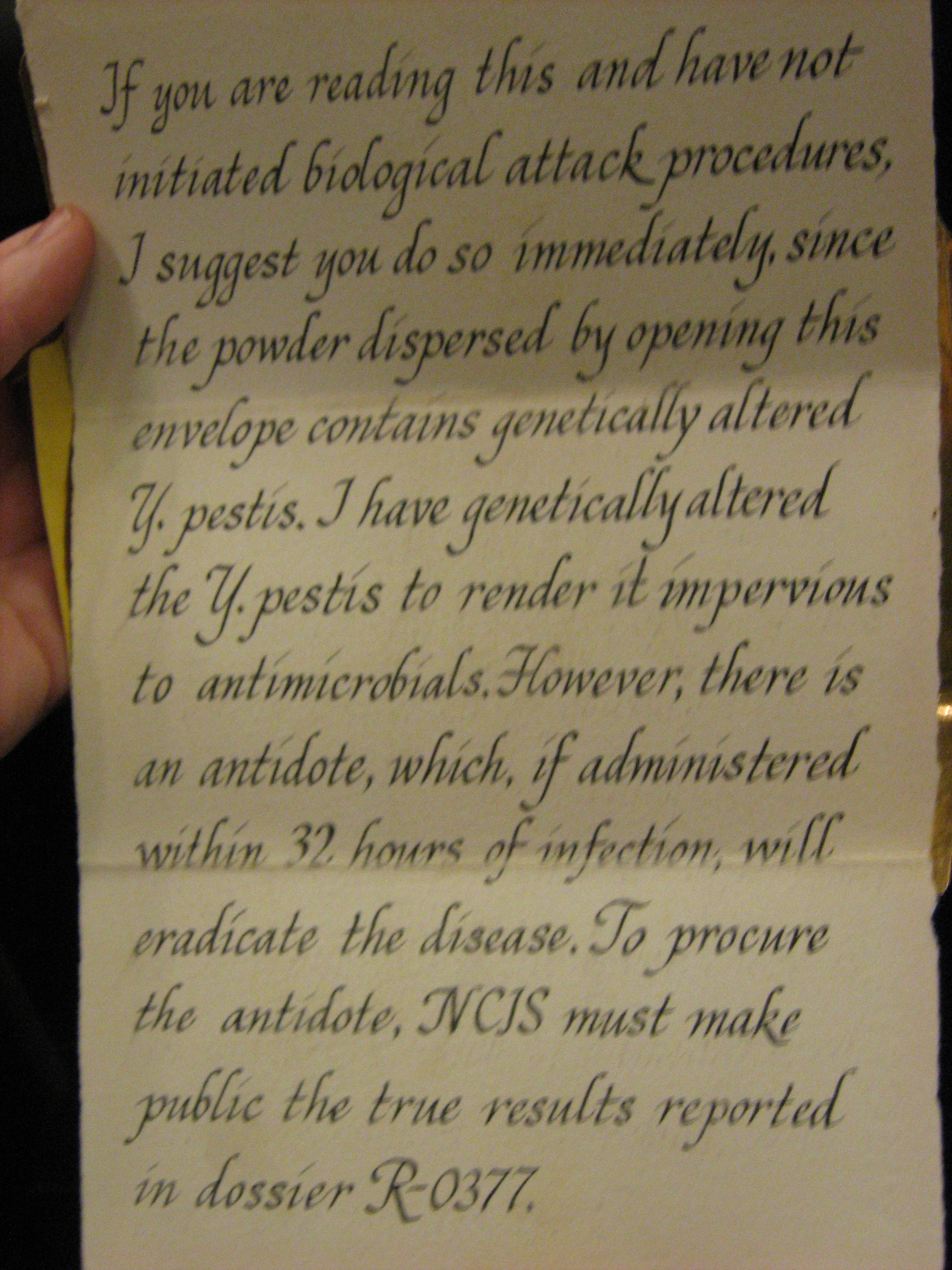
Letter sent containing Y. pestis that led to Tony's near-death experience in season two

During his tenure as a NCIS special agent, Tony operated as a supervisory special agent and undertook a long-term undercover operation throughout season four. In season two, he nearly dies from a bout with the pneumonic plague after a woman sends a letter filled with genetically altered Yersinia pestis to NCIS for revenge for what she believed to be neglect of a cold case. Tony ably leads the team in Gibbs's absence when the latter retires to Mexico after recovering from a coma. When Gibbs returns to lead the team, Tony declines an offer to lead his own team and resumes his former position to support Gibbs. At the end of season five, Tony is assigned as a Special Agent Afloat to the USS Ronald Reagan and later to the USS Seahawk. At the beginning of season six, he is reassigned to his original team at NCIS headquarters in Washington, D.C.

In the season 8 finale, Clayton Jarvis, the new Secretary of the Navy, tells Director Vance that he wants to include DiNozzo in NCIS's black operations program after the death of Lt. Jonas Cobb and the resignation of Jarvis's predecessor, Philip Davenport. Although Vance seems reluctant, Jarvis overrules him and gives DiNozzo his first assignment; stop an NCIS agent who is leaking information, who in the season nine premiere "Nature of the Beast" is purported to be the NCIS Special Agent Simon Cade. At the end of the episode, DiNozzo is shot by an impostor FBI agent who had killed Cade and attempted to frame DiNozzo for the murder.

== Characterization ==
Tony is written as a streetwise promiscuous former homicide detective. His behavior toward women is occasionally noted by other characters to be chauvinistic, and throughout the series Tony is shown flirting with most women he encounters. He does not respect personal boundaries, going so far as to rifle through his colleagues' possessions, both at work and in their homes, and to listen to private phone calls. In the episode "SWAK", Caitlin Todd described him as an "X-rated Peter Pan" who is "annoying" but whose absence is nevertheless keenly felt. The targets of this behavior are either victims of Tony's quests for new sources of amusement, or those for whom he believes he has reason to be concerned. Michael Weatherly commented on Tony's characterization: "Part of the dynamic of the show is that Tony irritates people, but when he's not around, they kind of miss him."

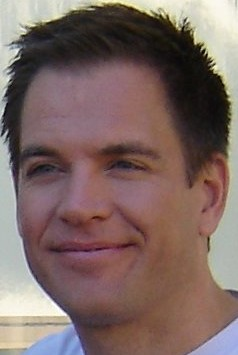
Michael Weatherly as Anthony DiNozzo filming in 2008

Although Tony is in his thirties when introduced, he is typically written as possessing a juvenile sense of humor that manifests itself in name-calling, teasing, and pranks directed at his colleagues. He delights in quoting movies in everyday life, often mimicking the original actor when quoting them;

In a nod to NCIS creator Donald P. Bellisario, Tony has also been established as a fan of Bellisario television series Magnum, P.I. and Airwolf. In the episode "Dead Man Talking", Tony introduces himself to a suspect as Airwolf character "Stringfellow".

Although his immature behavior often gets Tony into trouble, on more than one occasion he surprises his colleagues when an outwardly immature action on his part causes new evidence to be uncovered. McGee has described Tony's interrogation style as "Dirty Harry meets Keystone Cop". He is generally written as a highly capable agent, and in season four is offered a prized position as a supervisory/senior special agent in charge in Rota, Spain, which he turns down. By season ten, he is the only one out of Gibbs's field team who has been allowed to head an investigation. As Gibbs's senior field agent, he often pulls rank by ordering junior agents around and playing pranks on them. He most notably calls McGee "Probie" until Ziva is made a full-fledged agent. With the addition Ellie Bishop, Tony and McGee begin calling her "Probie" and similarly order her around, claiming that "it's part of the job".

The character is initially portrayed as a "technophobe" who, like his superior, has limited patience with the scientific method and technical terms. However, he develops an aptitude for technology in later episodes, and has been depicted hacking into computer systems.

== Relationships ==
=== Women ===
During the run of NCIS, Tony consistently speaks at great length about women. He pursues women on a regular basis, typically indiscriminately. Most of these relationships fail to progress past a certain point and have occasionally ended with humorously disastrous results. He has admitted to having commitment issues. The show's writers made reference to one of Weatherly's real-life relationships in the episode "Hiatus (Part 1)" when he states, "I've got a better chance of hooking up with Jessica Alba..." His real-life relationship with Alba occurred while both were performing on the television series Dark Angel.

==== Abby Sciuto ====
Tony has a friendly platonic relationship with Abby Sciuto. Abby describes this as progressive: "You're like a piercing, Tony. Takes a while for the throbbing to stop and the skin to grow back". The strength of their friendship was demonstrated when she helped clear his name after her assistant framed him for murder, or when he is seemingly killed in an explosion, or when he returns from his time as an agent afloat. Abby once states, "I love you, and would hate to see you hurt". She sometimes becomes upset with him, but these feelings are often resolved quickly.

==== Dr. Jeanne Benoit ====
In season four, Tony's new girlfriend, Dr. Jeanne Benoit, is introduced and appears as a recurring figure and subplot throughout the season. Tony initially wants to "take it slow" out of fear of their relationship becoming like his earlier ones. They subsequently consummate their relationship in the episode "Smoked" and Tony takes inspiration from movies to make their relationship special. Despite good intentions, Tony is unable to tell Jeanne that he loves her, until the death of a fellow agent convinces him to do so.

In the episode "Angel of Death", it is revealed that Jeanne's father is a wanted arms dealer. In the episode "Bury Your Dead", it is revealed that Tony is using Jeanne to infiltrate an arms smuggling network. Jeanne leaves Tony a greeting card in her apartment, as she leaves the Washington, D.C. area. In the episode "Family", Tony is shown struggling with how his relationship with Jeanne ended, with flashbacks of their relationship. Ziva tries to console Tony, but he rejects her attempts, insisting that he is fine. Contemplating whether he should leave NCIS to be with Jeanne, he rejoins the team. Jeanne reappears in the episode "Internal Affairs", when she accuses Tony of murdering her father. At the end of the episode, Tony apologizes for letting her get involved in something that was not her fault. Asked if their relationship was real, Tony answers "No". Jeanne then tells him she wishes she had never met him. In the episode "Saviors", Jeanne and Tony are shown to be on amicable terms. Later, in "Loose Cannons" Tony encounters Jeanne and her husband while investigating a case, where she worries about it being connected with her father. This proves to be correct, and they both struggle emotionally with the conflict that ended their relationship.

=== Female Agents ===
==== Special Agent Caitlin Todd ====
Tony's relationship with Kate is depicted as a sibling rivalry. Kate is often critical of Tony's attitude towards women and his disrespect for personal boundaries. In one episode, Tony sneaks into the bathroom while Kate was having a shower, to brush his teeth, which infuriates her. In "Bikini Wax", he threatens to expose a picture of Kate during a wet t-shirt contest. In the episode "Pop Life" they seek counseling for their bickering.

Tony buys flowers as a peace offering after annoying her in the episode "Vanished" and shows concern for her in "Left For Dead" and "Bête Noire", when she is held hostage by Ari. In the episode "The Bone Yard", Tony pretends to be Kate's lover. He appears close to jealousy when Kate accepts a date with the victim's brother in "Black Water". In "My Other Left Foot", Tony is obsessed by the idea of Kate having a tattoo and tries to ascertain its location. The producers state that it was intended for there to be a relationship between these two characters, and the series creator Don Bellisario said that if Kate hadn't died, she and Tony would have embarked on a relationship at one point during the series. In the episode "SWAK", after Kate is found uninfected, she continues to stay with Tony, lying about her condition to him even though she knows that the risk of infection is still imminent. She is devastated as he seemed about to die, and relieved as he survives.

Kate's death would have a serious impact on Tony, which along with other events make Tony "grow up" during the following seasons. As shown in the episodes "Kill Ari 1 & 2", the team struggles to deal with the shooting, culminating in a scene in which Tony and McGee mourn over the dead body of their deceased colleague in Ducky's autopsy room. After Kate's death, like the other characters, DiNozzo also has a vision of her postmortem. Typical to Tony's chauvinistic personality, Kate appears in the Catholic schoolgirl uniform that he had been asking about in the episode "Bikini Wax". After telling him that she always knew what he was thinking, she realizes that she is wearing the uniform and quickly berates him. This "sexual fantasy" is portrayed after Tony offers to go back out in the pouring rain to find the bullet that killed Kate.

==== Special Agent Ziva David ====
Throughout seasons four to ten, Ziva and Tony exhibit a high level of chemistry. Although their relationship was not explicit until the beginning of season 11 when Ziva left NCIS, the close bond between the two ultimately resulted in their daughter, Tali.

==== Special Agent E.J. Barrett ====
E.J. is introduced in the season eight episode "One Last Score". She took the lead investigator position in Rota, Spain, which Tony declined. Tony and E.J. begin a sexual relationship shortly after her arrival, much to the disapproval of Gibbs.

In a flashback in the season nine premiere, "Nature of the Beast", Tony confronted E.J. about her removal of a microchip from the body of a victim of the Port-to-Port killer. Subsequently, Tony suffers memory loss and E.J. disappears while another agent is killed. E.J. emerges from hiding in the episode "Housekeeping" and discusses events with Tony at a safe house while he is furious with her for her abrupt disappearance, but they go their separate ways after the killer is apprehended, with E.J. urging Tony to try to pursue a relationship with Ziva.

==== NCIS Director Jenny Shepard ====
In the fourth season, Tony's relationship with Jenny Shepard is shown to have warmed considerably in comparison to the end of the third season, with Tony occasionally being caught referring to her by her first name with even Gibbs joking about how close they were. This was due to Tony's involvement in an ongoing operation of personal importance to Shepard, in which they develop a strong level of trust. Their interactions become more frequent when Tony assumes Gibbs's responsibilities, and they become increasingly familiar as seen in the episode "Shalom". Tony was particularly upset at Shepard's death in "Judgment Day (Part 1)", and blames himself for following Shepard's instruction to abandon her protection detail. In the episode "Agent Afloat", Ziva reveals that, in the aftermath of Shepard's death, Tony has been drinking out of guilt.

=== Male Agents ===
==== Special Agent Leroy Jethro Gibbs ====
Through flashbacks in the episode "Baltimore", it is shown that Tony first met Gibbs in 2001 when, as a Baltimore PD officer, Tony arrested an undercover Gibbs while they were investigating the same suspect in different cases. When Tony realized that his partner was corrupt, Gibbs took the opportunity to recruit Tony to NCIS and became a mentor to him.

Tony greatly respects Gibbs and claims to have a mentor/protégé or father/son relationship with him, a feeling supported by the "tough love" Gibbs often demonstrates. Gibbs has the tendency to smack Tony on the back of the head whenever he says or does something inappropriate, starting with the last flashback sequence of "Baltimore". Tony tolerates being smacked only by Gibbs, reacting angrily when this is done by Todd and Ziva. When Gibbs starts "being nice" in the episode "Kill Ari (Part 1)", Tony irritates Gibbs until he elicits a slap to the back of the head.

Tony prides himself on knowing many of the military terms, acronyms, and slang that Gibbs regularly mimics. Tony explains these to others (serving as exposition), as well as Gibbs's unorthodox interrogation techniques, often accurately predicting Gibbs's next moves. Throughout the first several seasons, Tony's coworkers remark that he is becoming more and more like Gibbs, much to Tony's annoyance.

Emotionally scarred when his relationship with Jeanne Benoit ends, Tony begins confiding in Gibbs on personal issues, especially after DiNozzo Sr. is introduced in season seven and the frosty love-hate relationship between father and son is revealed. Gibbs confronts DiNozzo Sr. about his lifelong neglect of his son and calls Tony the best young agent with whom he has ever worked. Although he thinks very little of DiNozzo Sr., Gibbs does encourage the two to repair their relationship. As of season ten, Gibbs and DiNozzo Sr. are on friendlier terms.

==== Special Agent Timothy McGee ====
Tony's relationship with Timothy McGee was initially problematic. Tony largely ignored or degraded McGee's work and later began actively hazing McGee, as the least-experienced member of the team, from name-calling to making McGee carry all the gear and equipment to a crime scene. He would largely take advantage of McGee's naiveté and unfamiliarity with the team's "customs".

Contrary to appearances, Tony values his relationship with McGee, as seen in the episode "Probie", where Tony goes out of his way to support McGee and is the first to try to allay McGee's guilt after he accidentally shoots an undercover police officer. While Tony is the field leader, McGee becomes the senior field agent, and Tony shows him much more respect and confidence in his abilities. In the seventh season, the relationship between the two agents is on a much more equal footing, and Tony frequently calls McGee by his first name, Tim.

By the eleventh season, Tony is a lot closer to McGee and they confide in one another. Tony admits to McGee that he has been attending a support group to get over the events surrounding Ziva's departure, and McGee goes to Tony for advice when he is considering asking his girlfriend to move in with him.

== Reception ==
DiNozzo was included in TV Guide's list of "TV's Sexiest Crime Fighters". In November 2011, DiNozzo won TVLine's "Ultimate Male Law-Enforcement Crushes Bracket Tournament", and Ziva David won the "Ultimate Female Law-Enforcement Crushes Bracket Tournament" a month later.

His flirtation with Ziva received significant media coverage over the years, with the characters being referred to as a "power couple" by Entertainment Weekly. In 2009, TV Guide dubbed their interactions "TV's hottest love-hate relationship" and in 2012, they were listed in Entertainment Weekly's "30 Best 'Will They/Won't They?' TV Couples". EW.com also included them in its list of 10 "TV pairs who have us hooked as they dance around their attraction".

During the first season of NCIS in 2004, Ross Warneke of The Age described the character as "fearless but a bit wet behind the ears". A year later, Bill Keveny from USA Today commented that DiNozzo was "competent but immature". At the beginning of the third season, Noel Holston from Sun Sentinel described him as "a self-styled ladies' man, handsome yet hapless".

In 2011, one critic from Slate called him a "womanizing doofus given to spouting movie trivia" but added that all the characters on the MCRT team (Tony, Gibbs, Ziva, and McGee) "are men and women of honor, heroes who have all made significant sacrifices for their country". In 2012, Sandra Gonzalez from Entertainment Weekly wrote, "I have a deep appreciation for everything about Tony DiNozzo. I love his goofball ways, his pop culture references, and his endless supply of ways to get under McGee's skin. But like any perpetually lovable character on a TV drama, he also has a host of dark secrets, and when said secrets have a chance to come to the surface as part of a meaty and revealing storyline, it's a treat for us all." He was referred to as a "charming goofball/special agent" by AOL TV's Michael Maloney in 2010.
