= Michael Weatherly =

American actor and director (born 1968)

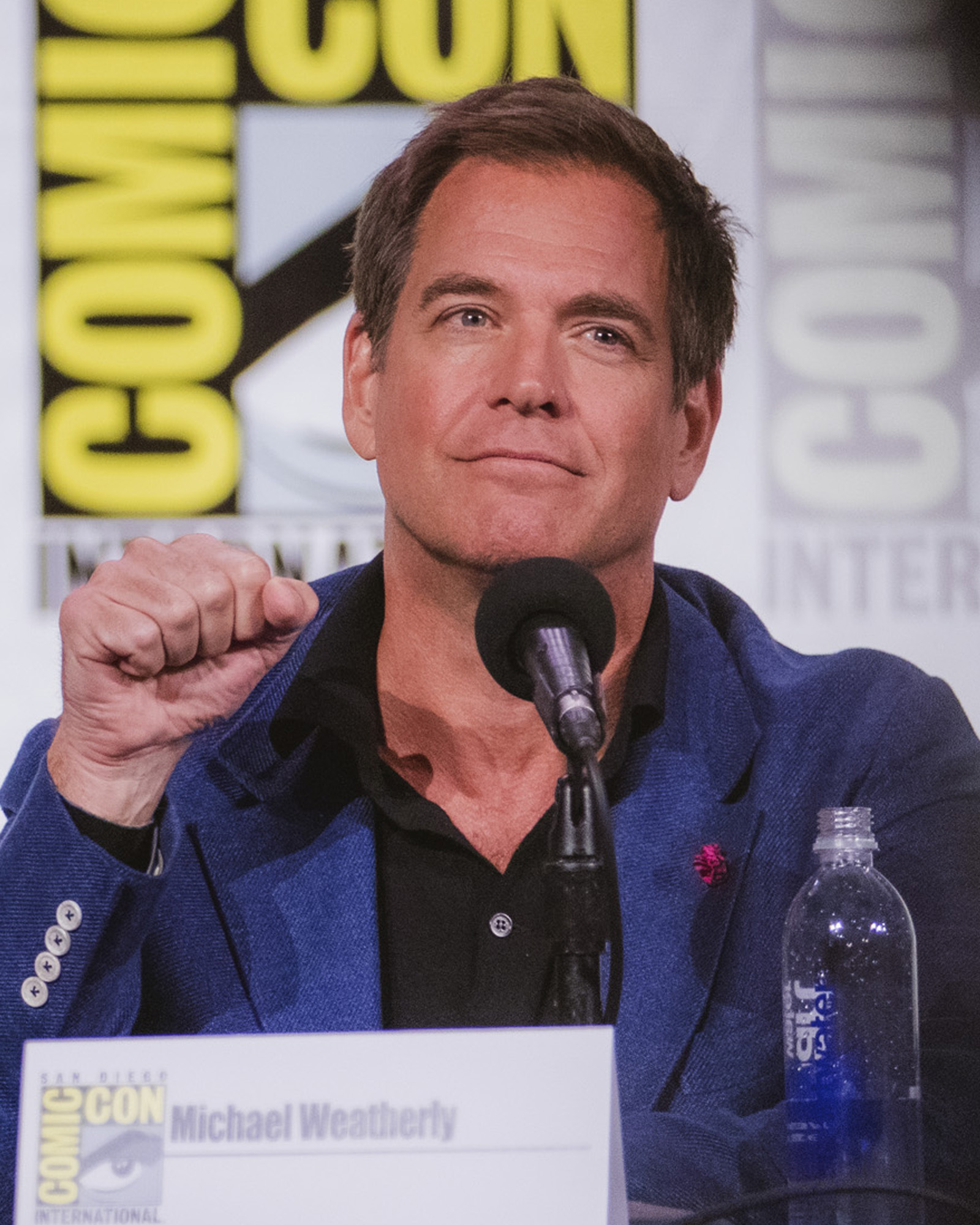
- Weatherly at the 2025 San Diego Comic-Con
- Born: July 8, 1968 (age 58); New York City, U.S.
- Occupations: Actor; producer; director
- Years active: 1990–present
- Spouses: Amelia Heinle (m. 1995; div. 1997) Bojana Janković (m. 2009)
- Partner: Jessica Alba (2000–2003)
- Children: 3
- Relatives: Alexandra Breckenridge (niece)
- Website: www.michaelweatherly.com

Michael Weatherly Jr. (born July 8, 1968) is an American television actor, producer, and director, known for playing the roles of Logan Cale in the television series Dark Angel (2000–2002), Anthony DiNozzo in NCIS (2003–2016, 2024, 2026–present) and in NCIS: Tony & Ziva (2025), and Dr. Jason Bull in Bull (2016–2022).

== Early life and education ==
Weatherly was born in New York City and raised in Fairfield, Connecticut. His parents are Patricia (née Hetherington) and Michael Weatherly Sr. He is of Irish descent.

Weatherly attended Fairfield Country Day School and graduated from Brooks School in North Andover, Massachusetts in 1986. He attended Boston University, Menlo College, American University, and the American University of Paris, but left college to pursue acting.

== Career ==
Weatherly began his acting career with a minor television role on The Cosby Show as Theo Huxtable's roommate. He played the role of Cooper Alden in Loving and later, The City, appearing in the role from 1992 until 1996.

Weatherly moved to Los Angeles, soon landing a role as a series regular on the FOX television series Significant Others with Jennifer Garner, though the show only lasted six episodes. He then met director Whit Stillman, who cast him in the 1998 film The Last Days of Disco as Hap, opposite Chloë Sevigny. Weatherly also appeared as a conflicted warlock in the series Charmed during its first season in 1998.

His movie credits include Meet Wally Sparks (1997) with Rodney Dangerfield, Gun Shy (2000) with Liam Neeson, Cabin by the Lake (2000) with Judd Nelson, and the independent film Trigger Happy opposite Rosario Dawson.

Weatherly starred in Dark Angel for the two seasons it was on the air. This role earned him three award nominations, two Saturn Awards for best supporting actor on television in 2001 and 2002, and one Teen Choice award for choice actor in 2001.

In 2003, he appeared as Senior NCIS Special Agent Anthony DiNozzo in two episodes of the CBS series JAG, a role he continued to portray in the spin-off series NCIS. He made subsequent guest appearances on both NCIS: New Orleans (2014) and NCIS: Los Angeles (2015). Together with Pauley Perrette, who played Abby Sciuto, he is one of only two actors who have appeared in all four shows (JAG, NCIS, NCIS: LA, NCIS: NO). In 2004, he starred in the television film The Mystery of Natalie Wood, portraying Robert Wagner. Since 2010, Robert Wagner had made 12 guest appearances on NCIS as Anthony DiNozzo Sr., the father of Weatherly's character.

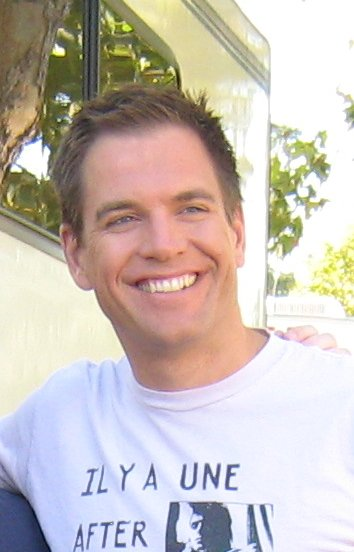
Weatherly on the set of NCIS in 2008

He was a guest presenter at the Australian Logie Awards of 2007 on May 6, 2007, and was a guest on Rove Live.

Weatherly made his directing debut with the season-eight episode of NCIS titled "One Last Score", which aired March 1, 2011, and also directed the NCIS season-10 episode "Seek", which aired March 19, 2013.

He portrayed Jesus Christ in a YouTube video that also featured comedian Sarah Silverman and was sponsored by a pro-choice organization. In 2015, Weatherly participated in the #Tapped challenge by posting a video of himself dancing to raise money for Broadway Cares/Equity Fights AIDS.

CBS announced in January 2016 that Weatherly would be leaving NCIS after 13 seasons of starring as main character Anthony DiNozzo. At the same time, the network announced he would star in a new series called Bull in fall 2016, loosely based on the real-life trial consultancy of Dr. Phil McGraw. In 2024, after a cameo appearance on NCIS the week before, CBS announced that Weatherly would reprise his role as DiNozzo with on-screen love interest Cote de Pablo reprising as Ziva David in a new NCIS spin-off series called NCIS: Tony & Ziva on Paramount+.

Weatherly was a presenter at the 68th Primetime Emmy Awards in 2016, and the 40th People's Choice Awards in 2014. He has appeared on numerous talk shows including The Rachel Ray Show, CBS This Morning, Live with Kelly and Ryan, the Today Show, the Late Show, and The Late Late Show with James Corden.

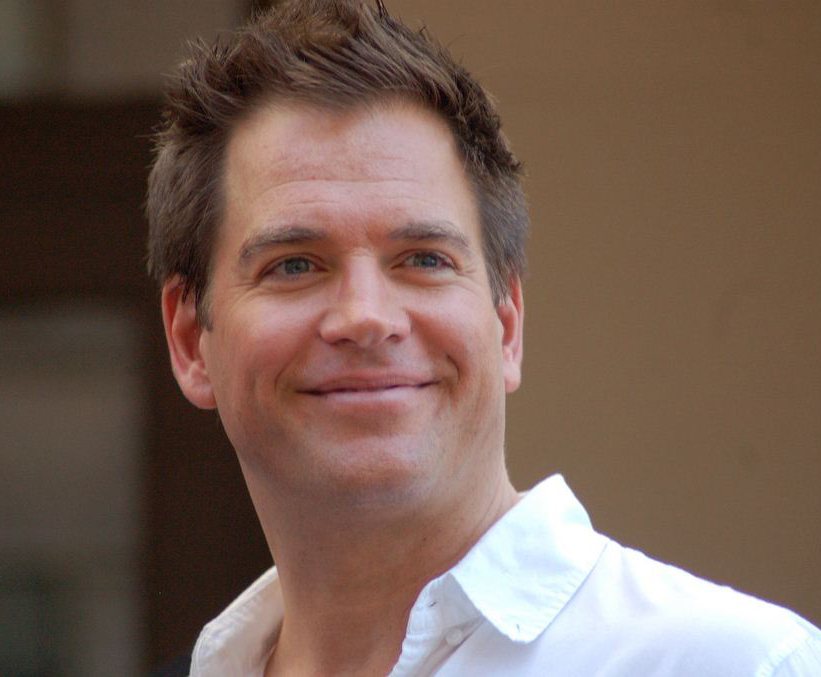
Weatherly in 2012

=== Directing ===
Weatherly has directed numerous short films and television episodes from the series NCIS and Bull. He directed the 2017 documentary Jamaica Man, about the life of British expatriate Nigel Pemberton, which premiered at the 2017 Telluride Film Festival. Jamaica Man won "Best Documentary Portrait" at the 2017 Doc LA - Los Angeles Documentary Film Festival, and "Best Documentary" at the 2018 NYC Independent Film Festival. The film was also screened at the 2018 Tiburon International Film Festival and TMFF festival.

=== Music ===
Weatherly sings and plays several instruments, including piano and guitar. He has written several songs, including two songs from the NCIS soundtracks, "Bitter and Blue" and "Under the Sun". He played in a band and performed music on his own while pursuing his early career in New York City. Another early project was a video shoot for a karaoke CD: A Taste of Honey's version of "Sukiyaki".

== Philanthropy ==
Weatherly and his wife are involved with nonprofit organizations such as the Tryall Fund, which focuses on improving education and public health in Hanover Parish, Jamaica. They are also involved with Environmental Working Group, an organization focused on environmental consciousness, and Healthy Child Healthy World, a children's health initiative.

== Personal life ==
Weatherly married his Loving/The City co-star Amelia Heinle in February 1995. Their son was born in 1996. They divorced in 1997.

During filming of Dark Angel in January 2000, Weatherly began a relationship with co-star Jessica Alba, leading to their engagement in 2001. The relationship ended in August 2003.

Weatherly married Serbian-Canadian internist Bojana Janković on September 30, 2009. As of 2013, the couple lives in Fairfield, Connecticut, with their two children: a daughter and a son.

Weatherly is the uncle of actress Alexandra Breckenridge.

=== Legal issues ===
In January 2018, CBS settled for $9.5 million with actress Eliza Dushku after she was fired from a recurring role on Bull after informing producers of Weatherly's inappropriate behavior on the set. According to documents from the official mediation, Weatherly was recorded on video making comments about spanking Dushku over his knee, soliciting a threesome, alluding to sexual assault in his "rape van", and other inappropriate remarks. After Dushku spoke with producers, Weatherly texted CBS Television Studios' president David Stapf, saying he wanted to talk about Dushku's sense of humor, though Stapf pushed back, saying, "Ms. Dushku made the show better." Days later, showrunner Glenn Caron terminated Dushku's expected role on the show despite opposition from studio executives.

In November 2021, Dushku testified in front of the House Judiciary Committee about her sexual-harassment accusations during her time on Bull. She said in her testimony: "In 2017, I was aggressively pursued by CBS to become a co-lead in a show called Bull. I was told that the role would be a six-year commitment to play a smart, strong leading lady—a competent, high-powered lawyer meant to counterbalance the existing male lead, and that the role had been written specifically with me in mind. However, in my first week on my new job, I found myself the brunt of crude, sexualized, and lewd verbal assaults. I suffered near constant sexual harassment from my co-star." Dushku added that Weatherly called her "legs" and talked about his sperm.

In December 2018, when the settlement was reported, Weatherly publicly apologized for the comments, saying "During the course of taping our show, I made some jokes mocking some lines in the script. When Eliza told me that she wasn't comfortable with my language and attempt at humor, I was mortified to have offended her and immediately apologized. After reflecting on this further, I better understand that what I said was both not funny and not appropriate and I am sorry and regret the pain this caused Eliza." Dushku responded that Weatherly broke the terms of their settlement by speaking to the press and characterized his apology as "more deflection, denial, and spin." Pauley Perrette and Sasha Alexander, Weatherly's co-stars from NCIS, tweeted in support of him following the accusations. In 2019, he was arrested for DUI in Hollywood. In August 2019, it was reported that both Weatherly and Caron were undergoing leadership training following the settlement.

== Filmography ==
=== Film ===
Year	Film	Role	Credited as	Notes
1990	A Taste of Honey: Sukiyaki (Karaoke)	The Boy	Actor, producer, director	Music video
1997	Meet Wally Sparks	Dean Sparks	Actor	
1998	The Last Days of Disco	'Hap'	Actor	
1999	Winding Roads	Mick Simons	Actor	
2000	Gun Shy	DEA Agent Dave Juniper	Actor	
2000	The Specials	Verdict, Crusader Industries	Actor	
2001	Venus and Mars	Cody Battle Vandermeer	Actor	
2001	Trigger Happy	Bill	Actor	
2005	Her Minor Thing	Tom Lindeman	Actor	
2010	Charlie Valentine	Danny Valentine	Actor	Short
2013	Under the Sun		Director, writer, executive producer	Short
2017	Jamaica Man		Director, producer	Documentary

=== Television ===
Year	Title	Role	Notes
1991	The Cosby Show	Theo's Roommate	Episode: "Theo's Final Final"
1992–1995	Loving	Cooper Alden	480 episodes
1995–1996	The City	Cooper Alden	11 episodes
1996	Pier 66	Decker Monroe	Television movie
1997	Asteroid	Dr. Matthew Rogers	Television movie (NBC)
1997	Spy Game	James Cash	Episode: "What Family Doesn't Have its Ups and Downs?"
1998	The Advanced Guard	Kevin, The Captive	Television movie (Sci Fi); also known as The Colony
1998	Significant Others	Ben Chasen	Recurring role; 6 episodes
1998	Jesse	Roy	Recurring role; 6 episodes
1999	Charmed	Brendan Rowe	Episode: "When Bad Warlocks Go Good"
1999	The Crow: Stairway to Heaven	James Horton	Episode: "A Gathering Storm"
2000	Cabin by the Lake	Boone	Television movie (USA)
2000	Grapevine	Jack Vallone	Episode: "Jack"
2000	Ally McBeal	Wayne Keeble	Episode: "Sex, Lies and Second Thoughts"
2000–2002	Dark Angel	Logan Cale	Main role; 42 episodes
2001	27th Annual People's Choice Awards	Himself	TV special
2001	2001 ALMA Awards	Himself	TV special
2001	2001 Teen Choice Awards	Himself	TV special
2002	28th Annual People's Choice Awards	Himself	TV special
2002	Nickelodeon Kids' Choice Awards	Himself	TV special
2003	JAG	Agent Anthony "Tony" DiNozzo Jr.	Episodes: "Ice Queen", "Meltdown" (NCIS backdoor pilot)
2003	29th Annual People's Choice Awards	Himself	TV special
2003–2012	CBS Cares	Himself	7 episodes
2003–2016, 2024, 2026–	NCIS	Anthony "Tony" DiNozzo Jr.	Main Role; (seasons 1–13, 24–Present), Cameo (season 21)
2004	The Mystery of Natalie Wood	Robert Wagner	Television movie (ABC)
2004	The Wayne Brady Show	Himself	Episode: "Whose Line Is It Anyway?"
2010	Stand Up to Cancer	Himself	TV special
2011	BAFTA Britannia Awards	Himself	TV special
2011	You Ask They Tell	Himself	Miniseries
2012	Major Crimes	Thorn Woodson	Episode: "The Ecstasy and the Agony"
2012	Dr. Phil	Special Agent Tony DiNozzo	Performer, episode: "Overwhelmed and Frazzled"
2013	Do Something Awards	Himself	TV special, Presenter
2014	Whose Line Is It Anyway?	Himself	Contestant; 1 episode
2014	40th People's Choice Awards	Himself	TV special, Presenter
2014	Hollywood Game Night	Himself	Contestant; Episodes: "We'll Need to See Your TV; ID" and "The Pittsburgh Steal-ers!"
2014	NCIS: New Orleans	Agent Anthony "Tony" DiNozzo Jr.	Episode: "Carrier"
2015	NCIS: Los Angeles	Agent Anthony "Tony" DiNozzo Jr.	Episode: "Blame It on Rio"
2016	68th Primetime Emmy Awards	Presenter	TV special
2016–2022	Bull	Dr. Jason Bull	Main role; 125 episodes Director: 2 episodes
2020	Lead with Love	Himself	TV special
2025	NCIS: Tony & Ziva	Anthony "Tony" DiNozzo Jr.	Main role; production; 10 episodes
2026	NCIS: Origins	Director Anthony "Tony" DiNozzo Jr.	Episode: "Return of the Mack"

=== Interviews ===
Year	Venue	Notes
2004	Good Day Live	1 episode
2004	The Late Late Show with Craig Kilborn	1 episode
2004	The Sharon Osbourne Show	1 episode
2007–2010	Journal de 20 heures	2 episodes
2007–2010	Le Grand Journal	2 episodes
2007–2012	E! True Hollywood Story	3 episodes
2007–2017	Extra with Billy Bush	26 episodes
2009–2010	The Early Show	3 episodes
2010	Chelsea Lately	1 episode
2010	The Bonnie Hunt Show	1 episode
2010–2018	Rachael Ray	3 episodes
2010–2018	Live with Kelly and Ryan	9 episodes
2011	Today Show	1 episode
2011	Rove LA	1 episode
2012	Late Show with David Letterman	1 episode
2012–2013	The Ellen DeGeneres Show	2 episodes
2012–2016	The Insider	8 episodes
2012–2018	CBS This Morning	4 episodes
2013	KTLA Morning News	1 episode
2013	The Arsenio Hall Show	1 episode
2013	The Late Late Show with Craig Ferguson	1 episode
2014	The Queen Latifah Show	1 episode
2016–2017	The Late Late Show with James Corden	2 episodes
2016–2018	The Late Show with Stephen Colbert	4 episodes
2017	Celebrity Page	1 episode

=== Other media ===
Year	Title	Role	Notes
2024	Off Duty: An NCIS Rewatch Podcast	Self	Released on Spotify in June 2024 with 25 weekly episodes expected. Co-hosted with Cote de Pablo. Episodes include guest interviews with former and curet NCIS cast members including Sasha Alexander and Sean Murray.

== Discography ==
Year	Title	Album
2013	"Under the Sun"	NCIS: Benchmark (Official TV Soundtrack)
2009	"Bitter and Blue"	NCIS: The Official TV Soundtrack - Vol. 2
2009	"All Fall Apart"	NCIS: The Official TV Soundtrack - Vol. 2
2009	"Motionless Man"	NCIS: The Official TV Soundtrack - Vol. 2
2009	"Pretty Baby"	NCIS: The Official TV Soundtrack - Vol. 2
2009	"Suffer for Me"	NCIS: The Official TV Soundtrack - Vol. 2
2009	"Another Fear Confirmed"	NCIS: The Official TV Soundtrack - Vol. 2
2009	"Genie in My Dreams"	NCIS: The Official TV Soundtrack - Vol. 2
2009	"Every Time I Turn Around"	NCIS: The Official TV Soundtrack - Vol. 2
2009	"California"	NCIS: The Official TV Soundtrack - Vol. 2
2009	"That's What I Said"	NCIS: The Official TV Soundtrack - Vol. 2

== Awards and nominations ==
Saturn Awards

- 2001: Nominated, "Best Supporting Actor in a Television Series" – Dark Angel
- 2002: Nominated, "Best Supporting Actor in a Television Series" – Dark Angel

Soap Opera Digest Awards

- 1994: Nominated, "Hottest Male Star" – Loving
- 1995: Nominated, "Outstanding Younger Lead Actor" – Loving

Teen Choice Awards

- 2001: Nominated, "Choice TV Actor" – Dark Angel

Doc LA - Los Angeles Documentary Film Festival

- 2017: Won, "Best Documentary Portrait" – Jamaica Man
