= Lucy Montgomery (As the World Turns) =

- As the World Turns character
- Portrayed by: Amanda Seyfried (2000); Peyton List (2001–05); Spencer Grammer (2006); Sarah Glendening (2008–10)
- Duration: 1991; 2000–2006; 2008–10
- First appearance: December 14, 1991
- Last appearance: August 13, 2010
- Created by: Douglas Marland
- Introduced by: Laurence Caso (1991); Christopher Goutman (2000)
In-universe information
- Other names: Lucinda Marie Montgomery; Princess (nickname)
- Occupation: Doctor; Intern at Memorial Hospital
- Parents: Craig Montgomery; Sierra Estaban
- Stepmother: Rosanna Cabot
- Brothers: Bryant Montgomery
- Half-brothers: Gabriel Caras; Johnny Montgomery
- Grandparents: Bart Montgomery; Lyla Crawford; Jacobo Estaban; Lucinda Walsh
- Aunts and uncles: Margo Montgomery Hughes; Cricket Montgomery Ross; Katie Peretti; Bianca Walsh (adoptive); Lily Walsh Snyder (adoptive)
- First cousins: Adam Munson; Casey Hughes; William Ross; Suzanne Ross; Luke Snyder (adoptive); Faith Snyder (adoptive); Natalie Snyder (adoptive); Ethan Snyder (adoptive)

Lucy Montgomery is a fictional character in the daytime soap opera As the World Turns.

== Casting ==
The character has been played by five actresses. The role was originated in 1991 by an unknown baby. Amanda Seyfried portrayed Lucy in two episodes in December 2000, before being let go due to difficulties between her and the creators. One year later, Peyton List stepped into the role on December 14, 2001. Lucy's popular pairing with older bad boy Dusty Donovan (played by Grayson McCouch) earned her many fans and a lot of publicity. List opted not to renew her contract, and her final appearance on the show was on January 24, 2005. Nearly two years later, Spencer Grammer took over the role on May 31, 2006. Melissa Claire Egan subsequently auditioned and tested for the role, with Grammer being cast. After six months of playing Lucy, Spencer was let go, and the character was written out. Her final airdate was December 14, 2006. On December 24, 2008, newcomer Sarah Glendening took over the role of a grown-up Lucy. She departed from the role on January 7, 2009. Glendening returned to the role on February 26, 2009, and left again on May 13, 2009. She returned to the role once again on July 22, 2010, and left on August 13, 2010.

== Storylines ==
Two years later, Alison Stewart received text message "Can I trust you? LM". It was from Lucy, and they soon met. She was now back in Oakdale with Johnny, who has gotten sick again and needs a bone marrow transplant as soon as possible. The two girls teamed up to take blood tests from every person related to Johnny, in order to find a match for the transplant. They soon discovered Katie was the perfect match, and Lucy took off to tell Katie. When she got back, Dusty was in the hotel room, having heard about her return and demanding Johnny back. However, Johnny's temperature was rising again and the three went to the hospital. Dusty found himself unable to be angry with Lucy, and he made plans with her to flee from Oakdale as soon as Johnny recovered. Unfortunately, Katie told Craig about Lucy's return with Johnny, and Craig went to the hospital where Johnny had the procedure. While Craig, at first, had forgiven Lucy for taking off two years ago, he later overheard a conversation between his daughter and Dusty, discussing their plan to flee Oakdale. Craig called Margo with the request to arrest Lucy for kidnapping.

After Craig called Margo to arrest Lucy for kidnapping Dusty asked Josie to listen for any news. When the police are after Lucy, Dusty asked Lucy to go to the warehouse and stay there. Together they plan for Lucy to escape and Josie gives Margo and Craig the place where they are but they were gone. Lucy quickly went to see Johnny before she left town promising him she would come back. Dusty arranges the plane and kissed briefly before Lucy left Oakdale.

Lucy returned to town February 26, 2009 to make amends with her father and Dusty and also to be there for Johnny.

== See also ==
- Dusty Donovan and Lucy Montgomery
