= Dusty Donovan and Lucy Montgomery =

Fictional characters from the soap opera As the World Turns

Dustin "Dusty" Donovan and Lucinda Marie "Lucy" Montgomery are fictional characters from the long running CBS daytime soap opera As the World Turns, and have been deemed a very popular couple during their time together. Dusty, a character who has been with the show on and off since 1983, was the older bad boy on the show, and Lucy, daughter of legacy characters Craig Montgomery and Sierra Esteban, was the spoiled, younger brat. These aspects made them very popular among the fans.

== Casting ==
Dusty was first seen on the soap in 1983, when Brian Bloom originated the role, where he was thrown into a love triangle with Holden Snyder and Lily Snyder, who’s also Lucy's aunt. Bloom was extremely popular during his time on the show, becoming the youngest winner ever to win the Emmy for Outstanding Younger Actor. Bloom remained with the show until 1988, after he grew tired of the scheduling involved in that field and eventually left the series to star in several television movies and numerous guest appearances. Dusty would not be seen on the show until 15 years later, when in 2003, Grayson McCouch, who was already familiar with daytime due to his role on Another World, took over. In 2006, McCouch got nominated for this role in the Outstanding Supporting Actor category. McCouch briefly left the show in early 2008, when his character was supposedly killed off, but returned in the fall of the same year, and remained with the show until its last episode on September 17, 2010.

Though Lucy has been seen as a baby during the nineties, in 1999, Amanda Seyfried was the first to portray Lucy as a teenager. Seyfried portrayed the role for only a month and then left due to difficulties between her and the creators. In 2001, Peyton List stepped into the role and quickly became an overnight sensation, especially after her pairing with Dusty. List opted not to renew her contract, and thus left the show on January 25, 2004. The character returned almost two years later, in 2006, now portrayed by Spencer Grammer. Grammer only remained with the show for 6 months, and was then let go because the fans never came to accept her the way they did with Peyton, and due to lack of chemistry between her and McCouch. Her final airdate was December 14, 2006. As of December 24, 2008, newcomer Sarah Glendening took over the role of a completely grown up Lucy. She departed from the role on January 7, 2009, but then returned to the role on February 26, 2009, and left again May 13, 2009. She returned to the role once again on July 22, 2010, and left on August 13, 2010.
