= Saturday Morning (2007 film) =

- Directed by: Rob Greenberg
- Written by: Rob Greenberg
- Produced by: Rob Greenberg; Jennifer Lieberman; Frank Nugent
- Starring: Joey Piscopo; George Wendt; Valerie R. Feingold; Louis Mandylor; Ashley Carin; Victor Raider-Wexler; Beth Ostrosky; Lillo Brancato, Jr.
- Cinematography: Tristan G. Sheridan
- Edited by: Harris Demel; James Manno; Joey Piscopo
- Music by: James Manno
- Distributed by: Vivendi Entertainment; Lightyear Entertainment
- Release date: 2007
- Running time: 81 minutes
- Country: United States
- Language: English

Saturday Morning is a 2007 American comedy film written and directed by Rob Greenberg and starring Joey Piscopo, George Wendt, Valerie R. Feingold, Louis Mandylor, Ashley Carin, Victor Raider-Wexler, Beth Ostrosky and Lillo Brancato, Jr.

Saturday Morning was Greenberg's first feature film, shot independently after years of failing to break into the industry. The film was inspired in combination by waking up early on a Saturday morning, an episode of Night Court, and driving into New York City for a date. Exterior filming was done in the town of Westfield, NJ, were the TV Series Ed was also shot.

== Premise ==
A dull, office dwelling loser named Wes Selman gets a strange birthday present from an uncle to get his house painted forcing him to awake at 6 a.m. and leading him on a two-hour odyssey through a strange other world where everything magically goes his way till 8 a.m. that Saturday morning.

== Cast ==
- Joey Piscopo as Wes Selman
- Valerie Feingold as Lisa Mangione (credited as Valerie R. Feingold)
- Louis Mandylor as Frankie Cicotelli
- Ashley Acarino as Tiffany (credited as Ashley Carin)
- George Wendt as Harold
- Lillo Brancato as Alan Delucci
- Victor Raider-Wexler as Abe
- Beth Stern as Beth (credited as Beth Ostrosky)
- Paul Haller as Mr. Goodman
- Danielle Carin as Sheila
- M.J.J. Cashman as Cousin Sidney
- Brooke Derosia as Brooke
- Dana Galinsky as Angela Hobart (credited as Dana Galinski)
- Mark Licht as "Babe"
- Vincent Maggio as Clay
- Dominic Resigno as Officer Briggs
- Kimberly Fitch as Runner
- Iris Gonen as The Waitress
- Zulay Henao
