= Stephen Mendel =

Canadian film and television actor

- Born: Stephen Charles Mendel; 1952 or 1953 (age 73–74); Montreal, Quebec, Canada
- Education: Bishop's University
- Occupations: Film and television actor

Stephen Charles Mendel (born 1952/1953) is a Canadian film and television actor. He is best known for playing Detective Freddie Carson in the Canadian crime drama television series Night Heat.

== Life and career ==
Mendel was born in Montreal, Quebec. He attended Bishop's University, earning his degree in theatre. He began his screen career in 1978, appearing in the film Tomorrow Never Comes. In 1981, he appeared in the film Les chiens chauds.

Later in his career, in 1985, Mendel starred as Detective Freddie Carson in the CTV crime drama television series Night Heat, starring along with Scott Hylands, Jeff Wincott, Allan Royal, Sean McCann and Eugene Clark. After the series ended in 1989, he guest-starred in television programs including Father Dowling Mysteries, Hart to Hart, Saved by the Bell, L.A. Law, The West Wing and JAG, and played the recurring role of Dr. Simons in the CBS soap opera television series The Bold and the Beautiful. He voiced Master Splinter in the Fox Kids television series Ninja Turtles: The Next Mutation. He also appeared in films such as The Terminal, Provocateur, Scanners: The Showdown, Angry Video Game Nerd: The Movie, Exception to the Rule and The Vindicator.
