= Sarah Glendening =

American actress (born 1982)

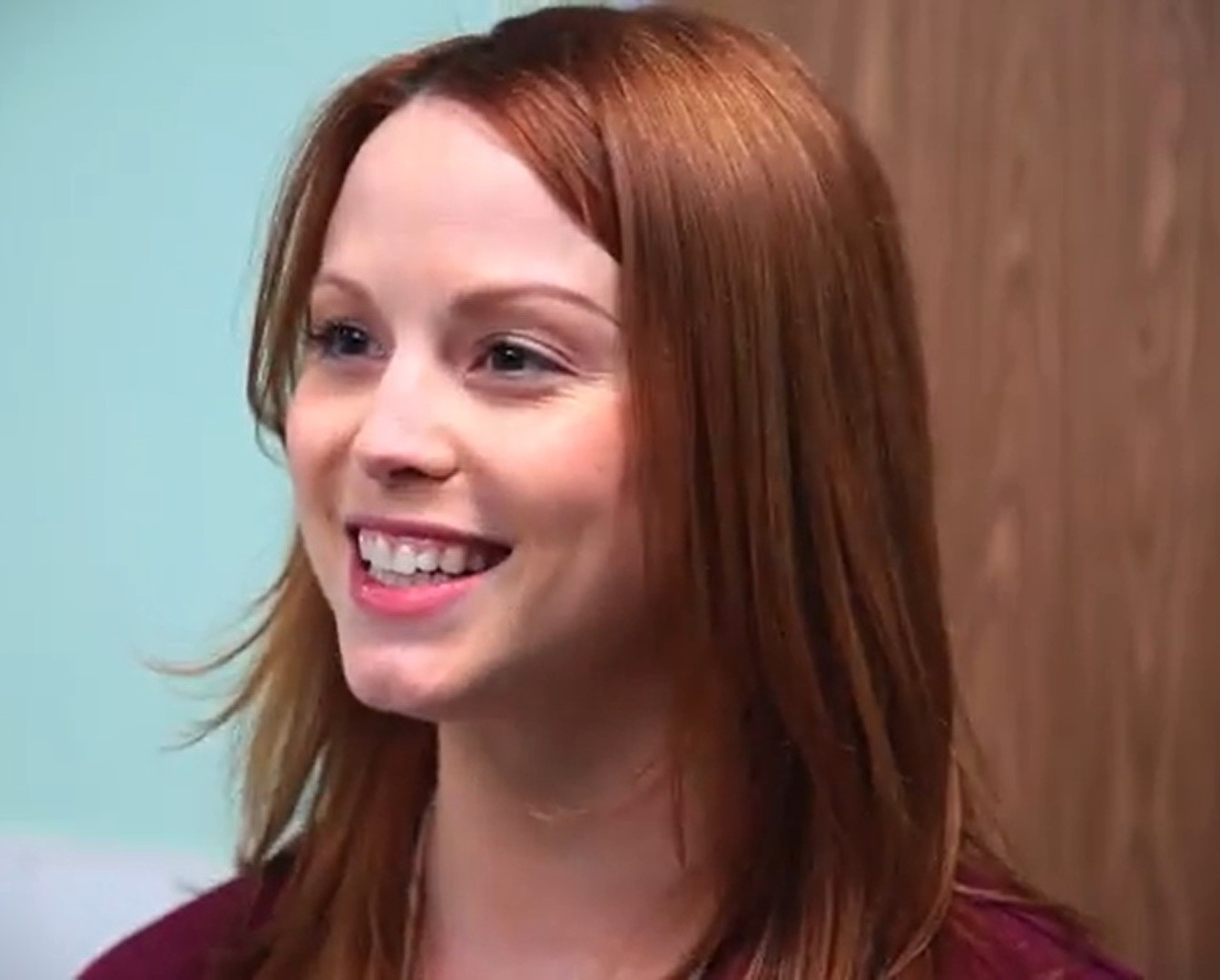
- Glendening in Heal Thyself, 2012
- Born: Sarah Marie Glendening; September 20, 1982 (age 44); Bradenton, Florida, U.S.
- Education: Carnegie Mellon University (BFA)
- Occupations: Actress, singer
- Years active: 2005–2016
- Notable work: Lucy Montgomery on As the World Turns Marissa Tasker on All My Children
- Spouse: Brandon Wardell (m. 2008)

Sarah Marie Glendening (born September 20, 1982) is an American former actress. In 2009, she joined the cast of the CBS soap opera As the World Turns, where she became the fifth actress to portray Lucy Montgomery. She played the role until the show's cancellation in September 2010. In the following month, she joined All My Children and became the second actress to portray Marissa Tasker.

== Theater ==
Glendening participated in multiple productions during her time at Carnegie Mellon including Wild Party with classmate Megan Hilty, Me and My Girl, Hello, Dolly!, and The Music Man (which was featured in the film Pittsburgh).

In 2005, Glendening made her Broadway debut in Good Vibrations, as part of the Ensemble and as understudy for the role of "Caroline", alongside future-husband Brandon Wardell who played the lead "Dave".

In July 2007, Glendening played the lead "Susan" in tick, tick...BOOM at the Adirondack Theatre Festival in Glens Falls, NY. The show was so well received that an additional performance was added, a first in the company's thirteen-year history.

In the spring of 2008, Glendening starred as "Diana" in the world premiere of the stage production of Mask, adapted from the film of the same name, at Pasadena Playhouse in Pasadena, CA.

During the summer of 2008, Glendening performed with Joe Iconis and The Black Suits alongside Krysta Rodriguez during The Summer Play Festival in New York City.

From April 13 to May 23, 2010, Glendening appeared on stage as "Molly" in the world premiere of Nightmare Alley, adapted from the William Lindsay Gresham's book of the same name, at Geffen Playhouse in Los Angeles.

From October 29 to November 4, 2010, Glendening participated in the stage workshop production of Loveless, Texas with Boomerang Theatre Company at Peter Jay Sharp Theater in New York City.

In the fall of 2012, Glendening and husband Brandon served as production managers on Delusion: The Blood Rite, an interactive haunted play in Los Angeles, created by Hollywood stuntman Jon Braver and produced by Neil Patrick Harris.

During the fall 2013, Sarah and Brandon produced the third installment of Jon Braver's Haunted Play, Delusion: The Masque of Mortality.

In December 2013, Glendening performed in the Open Fist Theatre Company production of BOTH: A Hard Day's Silent Night, a Beatles Nativity in Los Angeles.

Glendening has also participated in Neil Patrick Harris's interactive theater experience Accomplice: The Show in Los Angeles and New York City, which describes itself as "Part Game. Part Theater. Part Tour. All Fun."

In 2014, Sarah and Brandon produced the fourth iteration of Delusion: Lies Within.

== Television ==
Glendening started her Daytime career with a guest role on Guiding Light. She later joined CBS' As the World Turns as the fifth actress to portray Lucy Montgomery, replacing Spencer Grammer. She appeared on a recurring basis, visiting the show from December 24, 2008 to January 7, 2009, she then returned again from February 26, 2009 to May 13, 2009. She would return again in July for another short stay due to the cancellation of the series, when she returned from July 22, 2010 to August 13, 2010.

Glendening was scheduled to appear in the Lifetime US TV remake of the British series, Mistresses. The series was to star actress Holly Marie Combs, Cory Monteith, Brooke Burns, and Rochelle Aytes. Lifetime passed on the pilot, in favor of Drop Dead Diva. ABC later announced that they planned to shoot their own pilot, starring Combs' Charmed co-star, Alyssa Milano which went on to premiere in 2013.

Following the cancellation of As the World Turns, it was announced in October that she would replace Brittany Allen in her role of Marissa Tasker, ex-wife of JR Chandler and long-lost twin sister of deceased Babe Carey. Glendening first appeared on air on December 27, 2010. She remained with the series until its finale in September 2011. Glendening's character Marissa was involved in a same-sex relationship with popular character Bianca Montgomery, garnering a large fan following who named the couple "Minx".

She has also made appearances on shows such as Cold Case and Law and Order: Criminal Intent.

== Film ==
Glendening can be seen in the 2006 mockumentary Pittsburgh about the regional theater production of The Music Man, starring Jeff Goldblum, Ed Begley Jr., Illeana Douglas, and Moby. Other notable appearances in the film include Conan O'Brien, Ashley Judd, Alanis Morissette, Tom Cavanagh, and Mario Lopez's wife Courtney.

Glendening was in the 2009 independent comedy romance The Good Guy, opposite Alexis Bledel, Andrew McCarthy, Anna Chlumsky, Bryan Greenberg, Colin Egglesfield, and Denise Vasi (who was also on All My Children with Glendening), which screened at The Tribeca Film Festival.

In May 2011, Glendening was cast to star as "nerdy" girl Mandi in the feature-length film Angry Video Game Nerd: The Movie, based on the popular cult web series, and character, of the same name. She starred alongside Jeremy Suarez and the film's writer, director, producer and main star James Rolfe. The film premiered at the Grauman's Egyptian Theatre in 2014.

In 2012, Glendening starred opposite Eric Roberts in the satirical short Heal Thyself, which premiered at The Hollywood Film Festival and was used as a conversation piece during a healthcare forum at UCLA's Labor Center.

Glendening was also seen in Gala & Godfrey: The Classics, released in 2014. This project was her daughter Wendy's introduction on film when only a few days old.

== Music ==
Glendening is closely associated with New York City musical theatre writer Joe Iconis, having performed in a number of his concerts and shows.

Glendening often performs in composer and lyricist Adam Gwon's showcases.

Her voice can be heard on the Things to Ruin (Original Cast Recording) and Annie - The Broadway Musical (30th Anniversary Production).

== Filmography ==
Year	Film	Role	Notes
2005	Guiding Light	Nina	Television series, 2 episodes
2006	Pittsburgh	Townsperson	Film
2006	Law & Order: Criminal Intent	Sarah Jackson	TV series, 1 episode
2008–10	As the World Turns	Lucy Montgomery	Role from: December 2008 to January 2009, February to May 2009, July to August 2010 (End of series)
2009	Mistresses	Cecilia Barnes	Unaired pilot for Lifetime
2009	Cold Case	Vivian Lynn '44	TV series, 1 episode
2009	The Good Guy	Jen	Film role
2010–11	All My Children	Marissa Tasker	Role from: December 2010 to September 2011 (End of series)
2012	Heal Thyself	Nurse Tyler	Short film
2014	Conjuring Orson	Kirsten Powers	Short film
2014	Angry Video Game Nerd: The Movie	Mandi	Film role
2016	Gala and Godfrey	Thea	Film role
