= Requiem (NCIS) =

- NCIS episode
- Episode no.: Season 5 Episode 7
- Directed by: Tony Wharmby
- Written by: Shane Brennan
- Original air date: November 6, 2007

Guest appearances
- Anne-Marie Johnson as Marine Col. Stacey Radcliffe; Cameron Goodman as Maddie Tyler; Mark Totty as Army Major Max Bourdais; Stelio Savante as Danny Coyle; Nick Spano as Marine Sgt. Rudi Haas; Darby Stanchfield as Shannon Gibbs; Brenna Radding as Kelly Gibbs; Michael A. Shepperd as Mailman

Episode chronology
← Previous "Chimera"	Next → "Designated Target"
- NCIS season 5

"Requiem" is the seventh episode in the fifth season, and the 101st overall episode, of the American crime drama television series NCIS. It first aired on CBS in the United States on November 6, 2007. The episode was written by Shane Brennan and directed by Tony Wharmby.

In the episode, Leroy Jethro Gibbs is visited by Maddie Tyler, the childhood best friend of his deceased daughter, for help in stopping a Marine who she believes is stalking her. When Tyler is kidnapped, Gibbs becomes more personally involved in the case. It is later revealed the stalker is using Tyler's home to get their hands on four million dollars in stolen Iraqi aid money.

"Requiem" was originally intended to be the 100th episode of the series, until the producers switched the order with "Chimera" because they believed it would be suitable to air near Halloween. The episode was seen by 18.15 million viewers, which was the second largest audience at the time.

== Plot ==
The episode begins with Special Agent Anthony DiNozzo (Michael Weatherly) shooting two armed suspects at a dock before diving into the water to save his superior Leroy Jethro Gibbs (Mark Harmon) and a young woman from a submerged car. DiNozzo then attempts to resuscitate them.

The narrative focuses twenty-four hours earlier. The young woman, Maddie Tyler (Cameron Goodman), arrives at NCIS to see Gibbs. Tyler was the childhood best friend of Gibbs' daughter Kelly. Her father, a retired Marine, has died and she has no one but Gibbs to advise her about a personal issue. She asks for his help regarding her Marine ex-boyfriend Rudi Haas (Nick Spano), whom she believes is stalking her. At her apartment, Gibbs confronts Haas and warns him to stay away. After returning to NCIS he, DiNozzo, Timothy McGee (Sean Murray) and Mossad liaison officer Ziva David (Cote de Pablo) initiate an investigation on Haas. Tyler later calls Gibbs to tell him Haas has returned. By the time Gibbs arrives, he finds her home ransacked and witnesses Tyler being forced into a Jeep.

Tracing the Jeep to an abandoned factory, they also find Haas dead. Following an autopsy, Medical Examiner Donald Mallard (David McCallum) confirms that Haas was murdered sometime before Tyler's kidnapping, meaning somebody else took her. It is revealed that Haas was under investigation after he and two other Iraq War veterans were suspected of stealing four million dollars of aid money, but the money could not be found. Throughout the case, NCIS Director Jenny Shepard (Lauren Holly) believes Gibbs has become personally involved because of his relationship with Tyler. Gibbs also reminisces about Kelly and Shannon, his first wife, before they were murdered. Meanwhile, the rest of the team discover that Haas was not, in fact, stalking Tyler, but instead was using her apartment as an accommodation address, waiting for a letter he posted from Iraq with details leading to the location of the four million dollars. However, Gibbs already came to that conclusion and works on his own.

Returning to Tyler's apartment, Gibbs receives Haas' letter and retrieves the money, shipped from Iraq disguised as the "personal effects" of a K.I.A. He manages to contact the kidnappers, offering to trade the money for Tyler's freedom, to which they agree. After arriving at the docks, Gibbs hands them half the money and states he will release the other half when Tyler is free. The kidnappers attempt to kill them, but Gibbs manages to free her and they run to a car. With nowhere to go while the kidnappers are shooting at them, Gibbs reverses the car into the water. DiNozzo, the first of the team to arrive at the docks, witnesses this, and rescues the two. Before he is revived, Gibbs hallucinates that he is visited by his wife and daughter and is reassured that everything is fine.

== Production ==
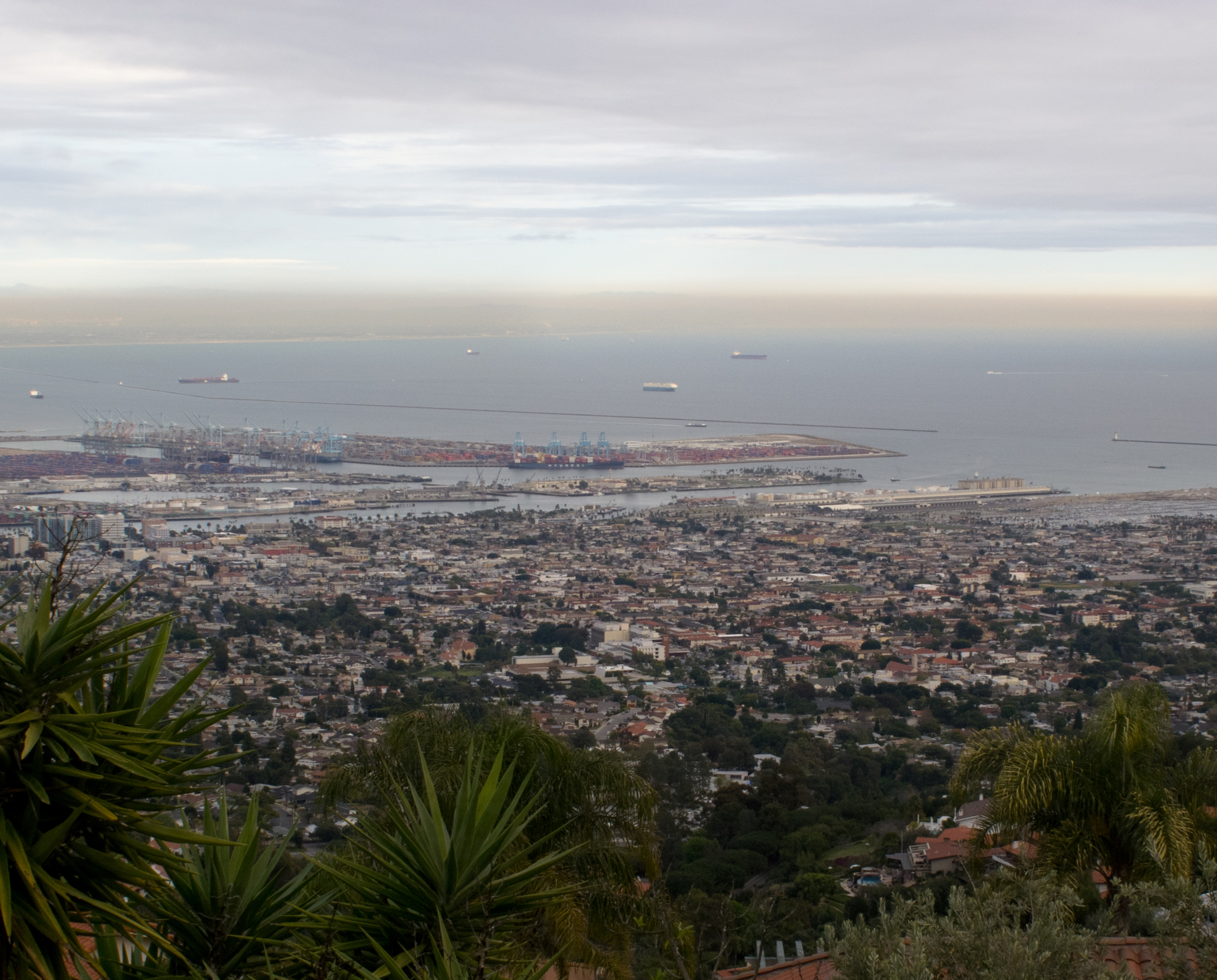
Some scenes were filmed in San Pedro, Los Angeles.

The episode was written by Shane Brennan, and directed by Tony Wharmby. Brennan wanted the fifth season to include "big moments" and "big episodes," and felt that "Requiem" was a "classic example" of that. The episode heavily featured Gibbs' back story, particularly his family life while he was a Marine. In describing the episode, Mark Harmon stated "What's been let out are just little glimpses, kind of like a strobe light, these little pops here and there. "Requiem" changed some of that, because his past was dug into. Gibbs is pretty tight, you know. He's real sure about the job and what he does on the job. And I think he's very unsure about everything else."

In introducing the character of Maddie Tyler, Brennan wanted to show what it would be like if Gibbs saw a girl who may have well been his daughter if she lived, and then put her into jeopardy. Since Kelly was killed while Gibbs served in Iraq, Brennan wanted Gibbs to be in a position where he could save Tyler as if she were his own daughter. The ending of the episode differed during the writing process. The original ending would show Gibbs burying his daughter's time capsule in his garden, showing he has put her to rest. However when "Requiem" was being written, Brennan thought of the two photographs, one showing Gibbs with Tyler and another of Kelly, they would be placed in a juxtaposition where it would appear Gibbs has his arms around Kelly.

While the episode was filmed, Brennan stated that "everyone, right across the board, every department involved in making this show was challenged by that episode." He also described Wharmby's directing style, stating "[Wharmby], who's just a fabulous director, has an ability to take a script, to get inside it, to understand it. And he's an old-fashioned director. He gets out there. He doesn't sit in what we call video village. He gets out and stands beside the camera." One of the major sequences in the episode were the scenes taking place at the dock. They were filmed in two separate locations; the dock was filmed on location in San Pedro, the port district of Los Angeles, California, while the underwater scenes were filmed at a tank in the San Fernando Valley. While shooting in San Pedro, Michael Weatherly was allowed to run up to the water, but a stunt man later stood in to perform the dive. The underwater sequences took two days to film. The crew noted that water was one of the most difficult environments to shoot in, as it changed the light focus, and communication proved difficult. Before shooting took place, the cast and crew present followed the storyboards of the sequence. The water was also dyed to look murky. The filming crew also noted that Harmon did not hesitate to accept to perform underwater. Body doubles were on hand, but the producers were so impressed by how Harmon played dead, they felt one was not needed, as they believed one could not replicate the performance.

"Requiem" was originally produced and to be released as the series' 100th episode. However, when the producers looked into the schedules, they realized the 100th episode would air the day before Halloween. Another season five episode "Chimera", seemed suitable to air on that slot. As a result, "Requiem" was pushed back a week.

== Reception ==
"Requiem" was seen by 18.15 million live viewers following its broadcast on 6 November 2007, with an 11.4/17 share among all households, and a 4.0/11 share among adults aged 18 to 49. A rating point represents one percent of the total number of television sets in American households, and a share means the percentage of television sets in use tuned to the program. It became the largest ratings for the fifth season, and NCIS's second largest audience ever at the time, behind the third season episode "Probie", which was seen by 18.17 million viewers. It was also up by almost two million viewers from "Chimera", the previous week's episode. In total viewers, "Requiem" easily won NCIS and CBS the 8 p.m timeslot; the Fox crime drama Bones, which drew second, was seen by around half the audience. It also became the seventh largest ratings for the week it aired.

Michelle Calbert from BuddyTV listed "Requiem" among "The 10 Best Tony Episodes" and wrote, "The scene where Tony dives into the water to save Gibbs and Maddie is one that leaves us gasping for air ourselves and was a great example of a very heroic Tony." Julian Spivey from Examiner.com included "Requiem" in his compile of the "10 greatest episodes of 'NCIS'" in January 2012, saying, "Every fan of NCIS knows the tragic story of Gibbs' wife and daughter and it's a storyline that pops up at least once a season. The best storyline involving this tragedy is 'Requiem' from season five, in which Gibbs helps a former childhood friend of his daughter from an abusive stalker. Because she was close to his daughter he'll do everything to protect her and this almost results in his death in one of the show's most entertaining and heart pounding scenes in which Gibbs and the girl are submerged in a car underwater. DiNozzo must come to their safety in one of the most exciting stunt scenes you'll see on TV. Four years later, this scene remains one of the series' most memorable."
