= Night Heat =

Canadian police crime television series

- Night Heat title screen
- Genre: Police procedural
- Created by: Don Flynn; Sonny Grosso
- Starring: Scott Hylands; Allan Royal; Jeff Wincott; Louise Vallance; Eugene Clark; Sean McCann; Susan Hogan; Stephen Mendel
- Country of origin: Canada
- No. of seasons: 4
- No. of episodes: 96

Production
- Executive producers: Sonny Grosso; Larry Jacobson
- Production locations: Toronto, Ontario
- Running time: 45 minutes approx.
- Production companies: RSL Entertainment Corporation (season 1); Alliance Communications (season 2-4); Grosso-Jacobson Productions

Original release
- Network: CTV (Canada); CBS (United States)
- Release: January 31, 1985 – January 5, 1989

Night Heat is a Canadian police crime drama series that aired on both CTV in Canada and CBS in the United States. Original episodes were broadcast from 1985 to 1989. Night Heat was the first Canadian original drama series that was simultaneously aired on an American television network during its original broadcast. It was also the first original, first-run drama series to be aired during a late night time slot on a television network in the United States.

During its original run it was the highest-rated Canadian-produced original series in Canada. The show won the Gemini Award for Best Drama Series in both 1986 and 1987.

The show stars Scott Hylands and Jeff Wincott as police detectives Kevin O'Brien and Frank Giambone who work the graveyard shift in an unnamed northeastern North American metropolis. The series follows their nightly police beat as it is chronicled by journalist Tom Kirkwood (Allan Royal) in his newspaper column titled "Night Heat".

== Synopsis ==
Allan Royal plays Tom Kirkwood, a journalist who writes a newspaper column titled "Night Heat" where he chronicles the nightly police beat of detectives Kevin O'Brien, played by Scott Hylands, and Frank Giambone, played by Jeff Wincott. O'Brien is a tough, cynical, veteran police officer and Giambone is his younger, hot-tempered partner. Kirkwood also serves as the show's narrator; his voice-over commentary starts and ends each episode, recapping the lessons learned and acting as a sort of Greek chorus.

The name of the city in which the show takes place is never mentioned. Each episode represents a single night's shift and, as a result, crimes often remain unresolved by the end of the show.

== Cast ==
=== Main ===
- Scott Hylands as Detective Kevin O'Brien
- Jeff Wincott as Detective Frank Giambone
- Allan Royal as columnist Thomas J. Kirkwood
- Sean McCann as Lieutenant James Hogan
- Eugene Clark as Detective Colby Burns
- Stephen Mendel as Detective Freddie Carson
- Susan Hogan as Nichole Rimbaud
- Louise Vallance as Detective Stephanie "Stevie" Brody (season 1 and part of season 2)

=== Recurring ===
- Wendy Crewson as Prosecutor Dorothy Fredricks (first 6 episodes of season 1)
- Lynda Mason Green as Detective Fleece Toland (first 6 episodes of season 1)
- Tony Rosato as Arthur "Whitey" Morelli
- Clark Johnson as Detective David Jefferson
- Deborah Grover as Prosecutor Elaine Jeffers
- Laura McKinlay Robinson as Detective Christine Meadows
- Robert Morelli as Joey Sanza

== Production ==
=== Concept and development ===
Night Heat was conceived by Sonny Grosso, a former New York City Police Department detective. Grosso served was the show's executive producer along with his partner, Larry Jacobson.

Grosso had over 20 years experience in law enforcement, later working as a narcotics detective. He and his former NYPD partner, Eddie Egan, were the detectives responsible for bringing an end to the infamous drug smuggling ring known as the French Connection. Grosso served as technical adviser on the film based on the investigation. He also worked as a consultant for the film The Godfather and as story editor for the TV series The Rockford Files, Kojak and Baretta.

Grosso and Jacobson were originally approached by CBS to produce a docudrama series following actual police officers, but they considered the potential risk in filming people who had not yet been convicted of a crime and decided against it. Grosso came up with the idea of creating a police series that would feature a realistic look at police work in a documentary style, similar to the 1950s/1960s police drama Naked City. He wanted to depict the life of the everyday police officer, in contrast to the slicker, high-action, high-drama, yuppie-oriented police series of the time such as Miami Vice and Hill Street Blues. The pilot episode was written by Don Flynn, a crime reporter with the New York Daily News.

=== Filming ===
The cast of Night Heat. From left to right, Stephen Mendel, Sean McCann, Eugene A. Clark, Louise Vallance, Scott Hylands, Jeff Wincott, and Allan Royal.

Grosso and Jacobson decided to produce their show in Toronto, Canada, otherwise the production costs would have been too expensive for CBS's late-night budget. At the time one could film in Toronto for less than half the cost of a major American city—Canadian union scale was lower and the American-to-Canadian dollar exchange rate was also favorable. The show featured an all-Canadian cast and crew and was partially funded by the Government of Canada. For Hylands, a 21-year veteran actor, frequently seen playing villains in U.S. TV shows during the 1970s and early 1980s, this was the first time he had been given a leading role, or the role of a "good guy."

The series was shot entirely at night between the hours of 6pm and 4am, which also made it easier to film since there was less traffic and it was easier to close down streets. The lower budget also meant that the show did not contain high speed car chases or shootouts with heavy calibre weapons. As a result, the show was more reliant on story and dialogue to capture audiences.

Night Heat was filmed on 16mm film using hand-held cameras, instead of the Hollywood-standard 35mm film, giving the series a grainy, documentary-style look. Much of the show was shot at the site of the former Lakeshore Psychiatric Hospital, which served as the series' police station; described as a "grim and forbidding setting," the hospital fit in with the gritty look that the show's producer, Robert Lantos wanted.

Filming a police drama aimed at both Canadian and American audiences in an unidentified city presented a unique set of challenges: The crew had to avoid capturing shots of landmarks and other objects that would give away that it was not an American city, such as Toronto Police cars, Esso stations and the CN Tower. While much of the show's dialogue included American law-enforcement terminology (for example: they referred to police "precincts" instead of "divisions", and characters had ranks such as officers, detectives and lieutenants instead of constables, sergeants and inspectors), they avoided terms from the American criminal justice system such as "grand jury" or "district attorney". In addition, the officers were never seen reading Miranda rights to suspects since there is no Miranda law in Canada. The writers also made a concerted effort to avoid using words that Canadians have a distinctive way of pronouncing, such as the words "out" and "about". Given Toronto's relative cleanliness when compared to larger American cities, the film crew would sometimes throw additional garbage onto the set during street scenes. Grosso, Hylands and Jacobson have all said in separate interviews that there was a time when the garbage that they had strewn about for a Night Heat shoot had been cleaned-up by city sanitation crews while the film crew was on break.

== Episodes ==
=== Series overview ===
Season	Episodes	Originally released	
Season	Episodes	First released	Last released
1	24	January 31, 1985	January 9, 1986
2	24	January 30, 1986	January 15, 1987
3	24	February 5, 1987	January 7, 1988
4	24	January 14, 1988	January 5, 1989

=== Season 1 (1985–86) ===
No. overall	No. in season	Title	Directed by	Written by	Original release date
1	1	"Crossfire"	Gerald Mayer	Edward Adler	January 31, 1985
An elusive cop killer looking to avenge the death of his 7-year-old daughter may be gunning for Kevin and Lt. Hogan. Note: First aired episode. A young Keanu Reeves and a young Cree Summer make appearances, as a television thief and a daughter of a cop, respectively.
2	2	"Necessary Force"	Mario Azzopardi	William Levinson	February 7, 1985
While chasing two criminals down an alley, Frank shoots one of them claiming he was holding a gun. But a search of the area turns up a flashlight.
3	3	"Deadline"	George Kaczender	R.B. Carney	February 14, 1985
After a woman is raped inside her home, her unwillingness to identify her attacker stalemates the case.
4	4	"The Stranger"	René Bonnière	Ian Sutherland	February 21, 1985
Continuing from "Deadline"; a very nervous woman (Jeannie Elias) walking in the park is afraid she might be the next rape victim. She runs away from an alleged attacker. The man (Chuck Shamata) is picked up and taken in for questioning. It was all just a misunderstanding and he is released, but when the woman is found murdered later that same night, the detectives are faced with proving the suspect guilty of multiple murder.
5	5	"Obie's Law"	George McCowan	Don Flynn & Sonny Grosso (story), Philip Rosenberg (teleplay)	February 28, 1985
In the series' pilot, Detectives Kevin O'Brien and Frank Giambone go after the hood (Nicholas Campbell) who's supplying weapons for local holdups.
6	6	"The Witness"	Mario Azzopardi	Philip Rosenberg	March 7, 1985
Continuing from "Obie's Law," Frank and Kevin try to protect a photographer (Matsu Anderson) who recorded a gangland killing.
7	7	"Deadlock"	Mario Azzopardi	Philip Rosenberg	May 2, 1985
While out on a date, Frank and Stevie catch a suspect involved in a robbery and discover he is wanted for murder as well; punk siblings lay siege to Mid-South and threaten to blow it up. Note: First appearances of Det. Stevie Brody and Prosecutor Elaine Jeffers.
8	8	"Ancient Madness"	Al Waxman	Stuart Rosenberg	May 9, 1985
Mid-South is assigned to protect an Irish terrorist who's the key witness in a gun-smuggling trial; after a philosophical clash with Kevin, the man is shot.
9	9	"Velvet"	René Bonnière	R.B. Carney	May 16, 1985
After the lead singer of the punk rock group dies from a cocaine overdose, Kevin and Frank investigate the case as a murder; Frank later learns that an old girlfriend (Michele Scarabelli) is tied to the main suspect. Note: First appearance of Det. Dave Jefferson.
10	10	"The Fifth Man"	Mario Azzopardi	Ian Sutherland	May 23, 1985
The Feds get involved in an investigation into two suspected suicides.
11	11	"Jane the Ripper"	Mario Azzopardi	Tim Dunphy & Peter Mohan	September 26, 1985
The detectives search for a psychotic hooker (Jennifer Dale) responsible for a series of slasher murders.
12	12	"Dead to Rights"	Mario Azzopardi	Stuart Rosenberg	October 3, 1985
The grisly murders of a father and daughter point to the family's son.
13	13	"The Quest"	George Kaczender	Peter Palliser	October 10, 1985
Kevin tracks the drug dealer who wounded him and stole his revolver during a drug sting.
14	14	"Power Play"	George Kaczender	Stuart Rosenberg	October 17, 1985
The detectives probe an arson-murder involving an uninsured apartment house.
15	15	"The Game"	George Kaczender	Tim Dunphy & Peter Mohan	October 24, 1985
A poker game turns deadly. Note: First appearance of Det. Christine Meadows.
16	16	"Mother's Day"	Mario Azzopardi	Ian Sutherland	October 31, 1985
Nursing-home residents are being victimized by a scammer (Janet-Laine Green).
17	17	"Poison"	Mario Azzopardi	R.B. Carney	November 7, 1985
While covering a union strike at a local plant, Tom is witness to a security guard being fatally stabbed.
18	18	"Snow White"	Mario Azzopardi	Edward Adler	November 14, 1985
A mentally challenged girl witnesses a murder in the park.
19	19	"Secrets"	René Bonnière	Ron Base	November 21, 1985
A movie star's (Megan Trotter) comeback coincides with the murders of her confidants.
20	20	"Songbird"	René Bonnière	R.B. Carney	November 28, 1985
The hunt for a priceless statue teams Kevin with an insurance investigator (Linda Sorenson) he once romanced.
21	21	"The Source"	George Kaczender	Don Flynn	December 2, 1985
The murder of his reporter-protégé (Carl Marotte) puts Tom on the hot seat.
22	22	"Innocents"	Allan Eastman	Bruce Martin	December 26, 1985
A businessman abnormally interested in little girls (Robin Ward) may have the answers to a missing-children case.
23	23	"Fire and Ice"	Mario Azzopardi	Stuart Rosenberg	January 2, 1986
Colby believes his brother (Philip Akin) may hold the key to a gem theft-murder case. Note: Both Allan Royal (Tom Kirkwood) and Susan Hogan (Nicole) are absent in this episode, although the former's voice is still heard.
24	24	"Brotherhood"	Mario Azzopardi	Ian Sutherland	January 9, 1986
When the leading opposition candidate to head the nation's most powerful union (Mario DiIorio) is gunned down, the current corrupt president (Joe Spinell) is suspected.

=== Season 2 (1986–87) ===
No. overall	No. in season	Title	Directed by	Written by	Original release date
25	1	"The Hero"	René Bonnière	R.B. Carney	January 30, 1986
26	2	"Dead Ringer"	Mario Azzopardi	Tim Dunphy & Peter Mohan	February 6, 1986
27	3	"Neighbors"	René Bonnière	Ian Sutherland	February 13, 1986
28	4	"Payday"	Mario Azzopardi	Lionel E. Siegel	February 20, 1986
29	5	"The Legendary Eddie Shore"	George Mendeluk	William Davidson	April 17, 1986
30	6	"The Passenger"	Mario Azzopardi	Ian Sutherland	April 24, 1986
31	7	"Moonlight"	Mario Azzopardi	Tim Dunphy & Peter Mohan	May 1, 1986
32	8	"The Fighter"	Joseph L. Scanlan	R.B. Carney	May 15, 1986
33	9	"Showdown"	Mario Azzopardi	Tim Dunphy & Peter Mohan	May 22, 1986
34	10	"Friends"	George Kaczender	Peter Lauterman & Angelo Stea	July 30, 1986
35	11	"Wages of Sin"	Mario Azzopardi	Roy Sallows	September 25, 1986
36	12	"The Hit"	Mario Azzopardi	R.B. Carney	October 2, 1986
37	13	"Trapped"	René Bonnière	Gabrielle St. George	October 9, 1986
38	14	"Children of the Night"	Jorge Montesi	Peter Lauterman & Angelo Stea	October 16, 1986
39	15	"Pride and Prejudice"	Allan Eastman	Bruce Martin	October 23, 1986
40	16	"Another Country"	Mario Azzopardi	Stuart Rosenberg	October 30, 1986
41	17	"Every Picture Tells a Story"	René Bonnière	Bruce Martin	November 6, 1986
42	18	"Fighting Back"	George Mendeluk	William Davidson	November 13, 1986
43	19	"Bad Timing"	Donald Shebib	Bruce Martin	November 20, 1986
44	20	"The Movement"	George Mendeluk	Peter Mohan	November 27, 1986
45	21	"Body Conscious"	Allan Eastman	Gabrielle St. George	December 4, 1986
46	22	"The Switch"	Jorge Montesi	Laurel L. Russwurm & Donald Ayres	January 1, 1987
47	23	"Masquerade"	René Bonnière	Rob Forsyth	January 8, 1987
48	24	"The Beaumont Line"	René Bonnière	Rob Forsyth	January 15, 1987

=== Season 3 (1987–88) ===
No. overall	No. in season	Title	Directed by	Written by	Original release date
49	1	"Love You to Death"	George Mendeluk	Gabrielle St. George	February 5, 1987
50	2	"Vantage Point"	Donald Shebib	Peter Mohan	February 12, 1987
51	3	"Play the Game"	Jorge Montesi	Peter Lauterman & Angelo Stea	February 19, 1987
52	4	"Punk"	René Bonnière	Ian Sutherland	February 19, 1987
53	5	"Beauty is as Beauty Does"	Mario Azzopardi	Stuart Rosenberg	April 30, 1987
54	6	"You're on the Air"	René Bonnière	Peter Lauterman & Angelo Stea	May 7, 1987
55	7	"And Baby Makes Grief"	Donald Shebib	Stuart Rosenberg	May 21, 1987
56	8	"All the King's Horses"	René Bonnière	Stuart Rosenberg	August 4, 1987
57	9	"Grace"	George Mendeluk	Rob Forsyth	August 11, 1987
58	10	"The Kid"	Mario Azzopardi	R.B. Carney	August 18, 1987
59	11	"Flashback"	Martin Daniels	R.B. Carney	August 25, 1987
60	12	"Tell Me a Story"	René Bonnière	Rob Forsyth	September 1, 1987
When a promiscuous young woman is assaulted and killed, detectives Giambone and O'Brien have a variety of suspects to choose from: the victim's half-witted brother, a writer turned martial arts cult leader (David Carradine), and one of his overeager followers. But it seems that life is literally imitating literary art.
61	13	"Comeback"	Jorge Montesi	Peter Lauterman & Angelo Stea	September 8, 1987
62	14	"The Pimp"	Mario Azzopardi	R.B. Carney	September 24, 1987
63	15	"Limo"	Timothy Bond	Laurel L. Russwurm & Donald Ayres	October 1, 1987
64	16	"Mean Business"	Miklos Lente	Peter Yurksaitis	October 8, 1987
65	17	"Tonight's News"	George Mendeluk	R.B. Carney	October 15, 1987
66	18	"Simon Says"	Jorge Montesi	Allan Royal & Linda Shier	October 22, 1987
67	19	"The Victim"	George Mendeluk	Ian Sutherland	October 29, 1987
68	20	"The Cost of Doing Business"	Donald Shebib	Giles Blunt	November 5, 1987
69	21	"These Happy Golden Years"	George Mendeluk	Rob Forsyth	November 12, 1987
70	22	"The Wiseguy"	Donald Shebib	Peter Mohan	November 19, 1987
71	23	"Freedom Dead"	Jorge Montesi	Clive Endersby	November 26, 1987
72	24	"Vengeance"	Jorge Montesi	Bruce Martin	January 7, 1988

=== Season 4 (1988–89) ===
No. overall	No. in season	Title	Directed by	Written by	Original release date
73	1	"Silk"	Timothy Bond	Rob Forsyth	January 14, 1988
74	2	"Chinatown"	Jorge Montesi	Peter Palliser	January 21, 1988
75	3	"Ain't No Cure for Love"	Randy Bradshaw	Jeremy Hole	February 4, 1988
76	4	"Woof"	Jorge Montesi	Ian Sutherland	February 11, 1988
77	5	"Whitey's Run"	Miklos Lente	Peter Lauterman & Angelo Stea	February 18, 1988
78	6	"Blowing Bubbles"	George Mendeluk	Rob Forsyth	February 25, 1988
79	7	"None Shall Sleep"	Jorge Montesi	Gerry Davis	April 21, 1988
80	8	"Forgive Me Father"	George Kaczender	Gabrielle St. George	April 28, 1988
81	9	"The Better Part of Valor"	Jorge Montesi	Peter Mohan	May 5, 1988
82	10	"The Privilege of Freedom"	Clay Borris	Glenn Norman	May 12, 1988
83	11	"Set for Life"	Jorge Montesi	Rob Forsyth	May 19, 1988
84	12	"Bogota Blues"	Jorge Montesi	Jorge Montesi & Peter Haynes	September 22, 1988
85	13	"Bless Me Father"	George Mendeluk	George Mendeluk	September 29, 1988
86	14	"The Mercenary"	Donald Shebib	Ian Sutherland	October 6, 1988
87	15	"False Witness"	George Mendeluk	Chris Haddock	October 13, 1988
88	16	"Archie's Riff"	Randy Bradshaw	Jeremy Hole	October 20, 1988
89	17	"Goodbodies"	Jorge Montesi	Peter Lauterman & Angelo Stea	October 27, 1988
90	18	"Ice"	Jorge Montesi	Peter Mohan	November 3, 1988
91	19	"Jumper"	Miklos Lente	R.B. Carney	November 10, 1988
92	20	"The Professional"	Scott Hylands	Tim Dunphy	November 17, 1988
93	21	"The Wrong Woman"	Jorge Montesi	Ian Adams	November 24, 1988
94	22	"No Regrets"	Gilbert M. Shilton	Peter Mohan, Chris Haddock and Jeremy Hole	December 1, 1988
95	23	"Elaine"	René Bonnière	Jeff King	December 29, 1988
96	24	"Blues in a Bottle"	Mario Azzopardi	Peter Mohan, Chris Haddock and Jeremy Hole	January 5, 1989

== Broadcast ==
CBS aired Night Heat as part of CBS Late Night, a late-night block of drama programming. It marked the first time in 20 years that CBS had slotted a first-run series against The Tonight Show. For six weeks in the summer of 1987 CBS moved the show to a 9pm slot, making it the first time that a Canadian drama series was shown on a major US network in prime time since Encounter, a short-lived ABC anthology series broadcast live out of the CBC's Toronto studios in the fall of 1958.

In late 1988, CBS announced it had officially canceled Night Heat. In spite of the show's popularity, CBS decided that it could get even better ratings in the late-night timeslot with The Pat Sajak Show, a talk show fronted by Wheel of Fortune host Pat Sajak. Over a fourth of CBS's affiliates expressed more interest in running the Sajak program than continuing to run Night Heat and the last episode aired on CBS in January 1989 even though CTV still had a full season on film that had yet to be aired.

After the series was canceled, reruns continued to air on CBS for another two years, and on Canadian television well into the early 2000s.

== Reception ==
=== Ratings ===
Night Heat received good ratings for CBS; the show drew an average of 20% of TV viewers in its timeslot and at times the show even outperformed NBC's The Tonight Show Starring Johnny Carson in such markets as New York, Boston, Philadelphia and Chicago.

In Canada Night Heat attracted a million viewers a week. Critics in Canada were generally enthusiastic about Night Heat and were proud of the fact that it was being shown on American television. Critics such as Rick Salutin of The Globe and Mail expressed disappointment that the show hid or downplayed the fact that it was Canadian in order to appeal to US audiences: "they never say it's Toronto. It's just the city."

=== Accolades ===
Night Heat won the award for Best Drama Series at the 1986 Gemini Awards. At the 1987 Gemini Awards the series again won the award for Best Drama Series, actor Eugene Clark won the award for Best Performance by a Supporting Actor and writer Bob Carney won the award for Best Writing in a Dramatic Series for the episode titled "The Hit". Night Heat also won the 1987 Gemini award in the category of TV Guide's Most Popular Program, an award based on ballots submitted by the magazine's readers in Canada.

At the 1988 Gemini Awards writers Tim Dunphy and Peter Mohan won the award for Best Writing in a Dramatic Series and Night Heat again won TV Guide's Most Popular Program award. In 1989 the series writer Chris Haddock won the Gemini Award for Best Writing in a Dramatic Series for the episode titled "False Witness".
