= Lillo Brancato =

American actor (born 1976)

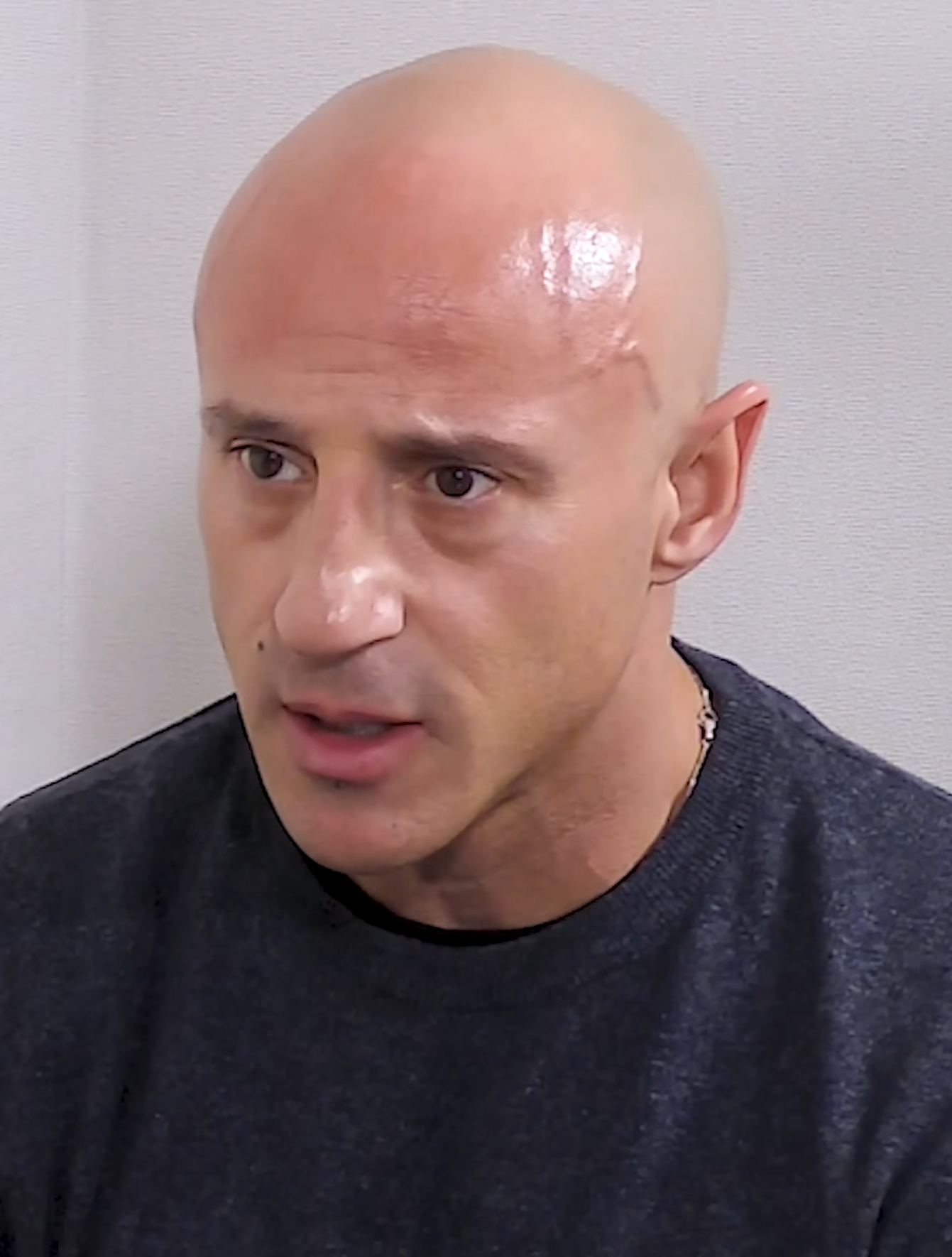
- Brancato in 2023
- Born: Saúl Rodríguez; August 30, 1976 (age 50); Bogotá, Colombia
- Occupation: Actor
- Years active: 1993–2007; 2014–present
- Brancato's voice On his brother and childhood in Yonkers; First published December 17, 2023

Lillo Brancato Jr. (born Saúl Rodríguez, August 30, 1976) is an American actor. He is best known for his portrayal of Calogero in Robert De Niro's 1993 directorial debut, A Bronx Tale. He also portrayed Matthew Bevilaqua, a young aspiring mobster, on The Sopranos.

In 2005, Brancato was arrested in connection with a burglary during which an off-duty police officer was killed. He was acquitted of murder in 2008 but convicted of first-degree attempted burglary and sentenced to 10 years in prison. He was released on parole in 2013.

== Early life ==
Brancato was born Saúl Rodríguez in Bogotá, Colombia, on August 30, 1976. Adopted when he was four months old, he was raised by Italian-American parents, Lillo Brancato Sr., a construction worker, and Domenica, an electrolysist, in Yonkers, New York. Brancato studied at Mount Saint Michael Academy. His adoptive brother, Vinny, briefly worked as a fashion model and now works as a Yonkers civil servant.

Although he was born in Colombia, Brancato has said, "I consider myself Italian. I was raised to eat pasta." Brancato was discovered in 1992, while swimming at New York's Jones Beach, by a talent scout who noticed Brancato's resemblance to Robert De Niro. Brancato was a fan of De Niro and impressed the scout with an impression of Travis Bickle from Taxi Driver. This won him the role of De Niro's son in A Bronx Tale (1993).

== Career ==
Brancato acted in three films in the mid-1990s, before joining the cast of The Sopranos. In A Bronx Tale (1993), he played the main character named Calogero, a teenager torn between his father and a mob boss who befriended him as a child (according to New York Magazine, Brancato earned $25,000 ($55,700 today) for the role). He further appeared in Renaissance Man (1994), followed by a minor but climactic role as a radio operator in Crimson Tide (1995).

In the second season of The Sopranos, which HBO broadcast in 2000, Brancato appeared as Matthew Bevilaqua, a young mobster associated with Tony Soprano's crime syndicate. Bevilaqua first appeared in the second-season premiere, "Guy Walks into a Psychiatrist's Office...", and appeared in five more episodes. The character was murdered in "From Where to Eternity", before appearing in a flashback during "Bust Out". Brancato also played a mobster in the TV series Falcone, which debuted in 2000. Brancato went on to star in 'R Xmas (2001), appearing with fellow Sopranos cast member Drea de Matteo, and appeared opposite Eddie Murphy as Larry in The Adventures of Pluto Nash (2002).

Brancato's last film before being charged in 2005 for first-degree burglary was Saturday Morning, released in 2007. The director, whose brother-in-law is a police officer, edited down all of Brancato's scenes during post-production. Following his release from prison in 2013, Brancato made his return to acting with Back in The Day (2016). He has since had supporting roles in films including Dead on Arrival (2017) – a remake of D.O.A. (1950) – Vamp Bikers Dos and Vamp Bikers Tres by Eric Spade Rivas (2015–2017) and the 5th Borough (2020). He starred in Wasted Talent (2018), a documentary that follows his career, as well as his struggles with addiction and his criminal convictions. Brancato can be heard narrating the music video for the Chris Brown and Young Thug song "City Girls", released on December 4, 2020.

== Legal troubles ==
=== Drug use and possession charge ===
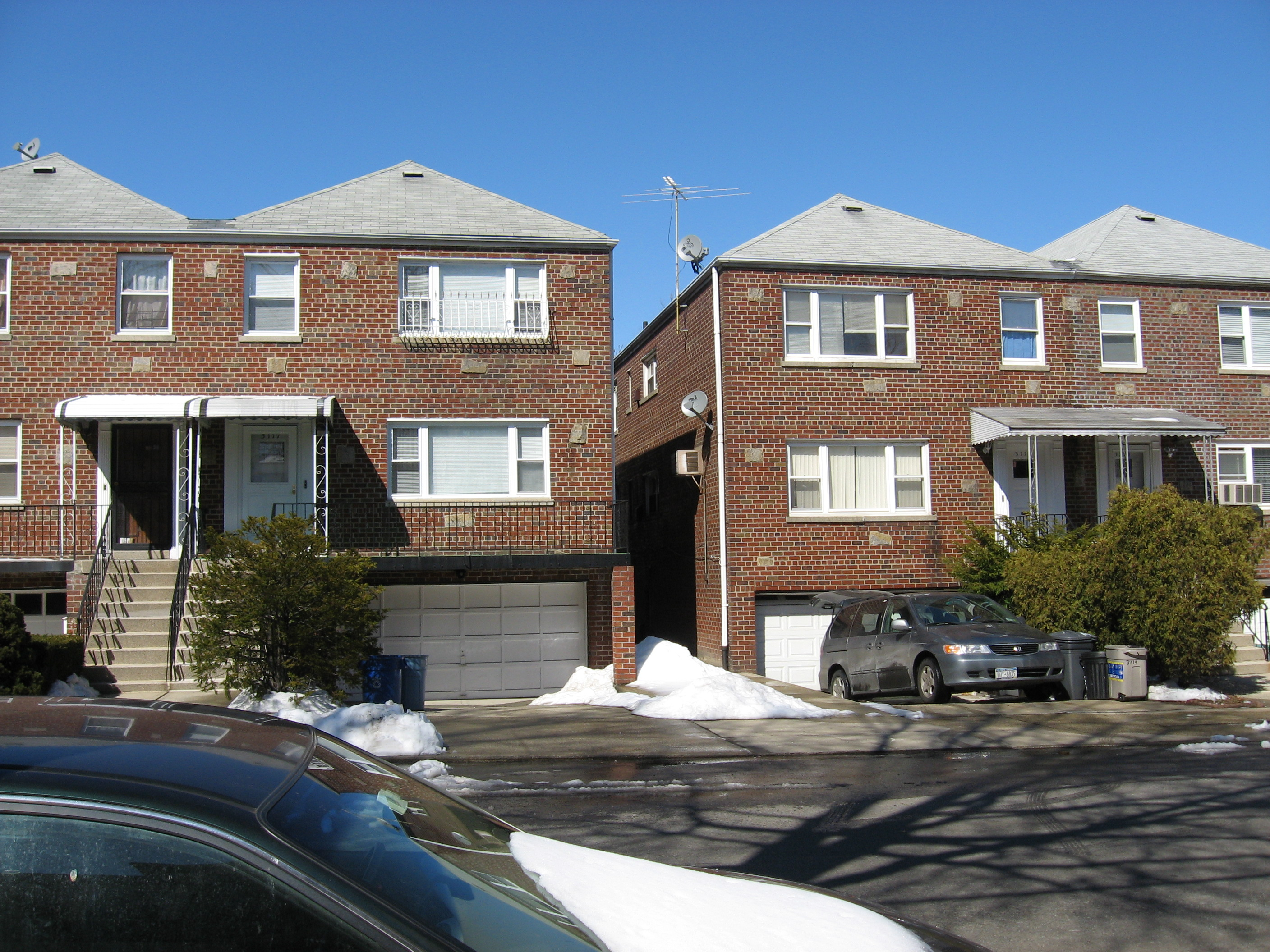
3117-3119 Arnow Place, Bronx, New York 10461, site of the shooting. The house left of the alleyway, number 3117, was Daniel Enchautegui's residence; number 3119, right of the alleyway, was the house Brancato and his accomplice Armento attempted to burglarize.

Brancato started using drugs and alcohol shortly after beginning his acting career in 1992. He was addicted to cocaine and heroin by his mid-20s.

On June 10, 2005, Brancato was arrested in Yonkers, New York by the Yonkers Police Department. Officers originally pulled Brancato over for having a rear brake light out and found he had an expired registration and no other papers for the vehicle. He gave police permission to look in a cigarette box, where they found four bags of heroin. He was charged with a Class A misdemeanor for criminal possession of a controlled substance in the seventh degree.

=== Murder charge and burglary conviction ===
Exactly six months later, on December 10, 2005, Brancato was arrested by the New York City Police Department (NYPD) in the Bronx for the murder of 28-year-old policeman Daniel Enchautegui, who was at home and off-duty at the time of his death. Enchautegui had served with the NYPD for three years and was assigned to the 40th Precinct in the Bronx. Enchautegui confronted Brancato (then 29) and his accomplice, Steven Armento (48), outside a vacant house located at 3119 Arnow Place, next to his own, after hearing glass break. While Enchautegui waited for backup, a gunfight erupted and Enchautegui was shot. He was later taken to Jacobi Medical Center, where he died.

Armento, who was the father of Brancato's girlfriend Stefanie, was found to have fired the fatal shot that killed Enchautegui and subsequently convicted of first-degree murder on October 30, 2008, receiving a sentence of life in prison without parole (Armento died on January 2, 2024, at the Mohawk Correctional Facility in upstate New York).

Brancato was charged with second-degree murder, and his trial began on November 17, 2008. On December 22, 2008, a jury found him not guilty of murder but found him guilty of first-degree attempted burglary. On January 9, 2009, a judge sentenced him to 10 years in prison.

Brancato was incarcerated on Rikers Island and as state inmate #09A0227 in the Oneida Correctional Facility in Rome, New York, and was subsequently transferred to the Hudson Correctional Facility. While in prison, Brancato continued his drug use, suffering a heroin overdose on at least one occasion. On December 31, 2013, he was released on parole. In 2018, Brancato said he was 11 years sober and had returned to acting.

== Filmography ==
=== Film ===
Year	Title	Role	Notes
1993	A Bronx Tale	Calogero	
1994	Renaissance Man	Pvt. Donnie Benitez	
1995	Crimson Tide	Petty Officer Third Class Russell Vossler	
1997	Firehouse	Gaetano Luvullo	TV movie
1998	Provocateur	Chris Finn	
1998	Enemy of the State	Young Worker	
1999	The Florentine	Pretty	
2000	Blue Moon	Pete	
2000	Mambo Café	Weasel	
2000	Table One	Johnnie	
2001	Sticks	Lenny Prince	
2001	'R Xmas	The Husband	
2001	In the Shadows	Jimmy Pierazzi	
2001	The Adventures of Pluto Nash	Larry	
2002	The Real Deal	Samy Saxo	
2004	Downtown: A Street Tale	Lenny	
2005	Slingshot	DJ	
2005	Searching for Bobby D	Bobby	
2007	Saturday Morning	Alan Delucci	
2015	The Bronx Dahmer	Joey	Short
2016	Back in the Day	Nicky	
2016	Vamp Bikers Tres	Tony	
2017	Man of the House	Desk Clerk	Short
2017	Dead on Arrival	Zanca	
2018	King of Newark 2	Bruno	
2019	The Fearless Two	Tiger	
2020	5th Borough	Sonny Finici	
2021	The Phone Call	Johnny	Short
2021	The War of the Worlds 2021	Stranger	Short
2021	Monsters of Mulberry Street	Father Palladino	
2021	Made in Mexico	Ochoa	
2022	I'm on Fire	Sal	Short
2022	Sleepyhead	Lillo Fante	

=== Television ===
Year	Film	Role	Notes
1999	Dead Man's Gun	Gulseppe Guissipini	Episode: "The Vine"
2000	The Sopranos	Matthew Bevilaqua	Recurring Cast: Season 2
2000	Falcone	Lucky	Episode: "Windows"
2002	NYPD Blue	Gary Montaneri	Episode: "Dead Meat in New Deli"

=== Music video ===
Year	Artist	Title	Notes
2020	Chris Brown and Young Thug	"City Girls"	Narrator (voice)

=== Documentary ===
Year	Title
2018	Wasted Talent
