= Brandon Wardell (actor) =

American Actor/Singer/Producer (born 1975)

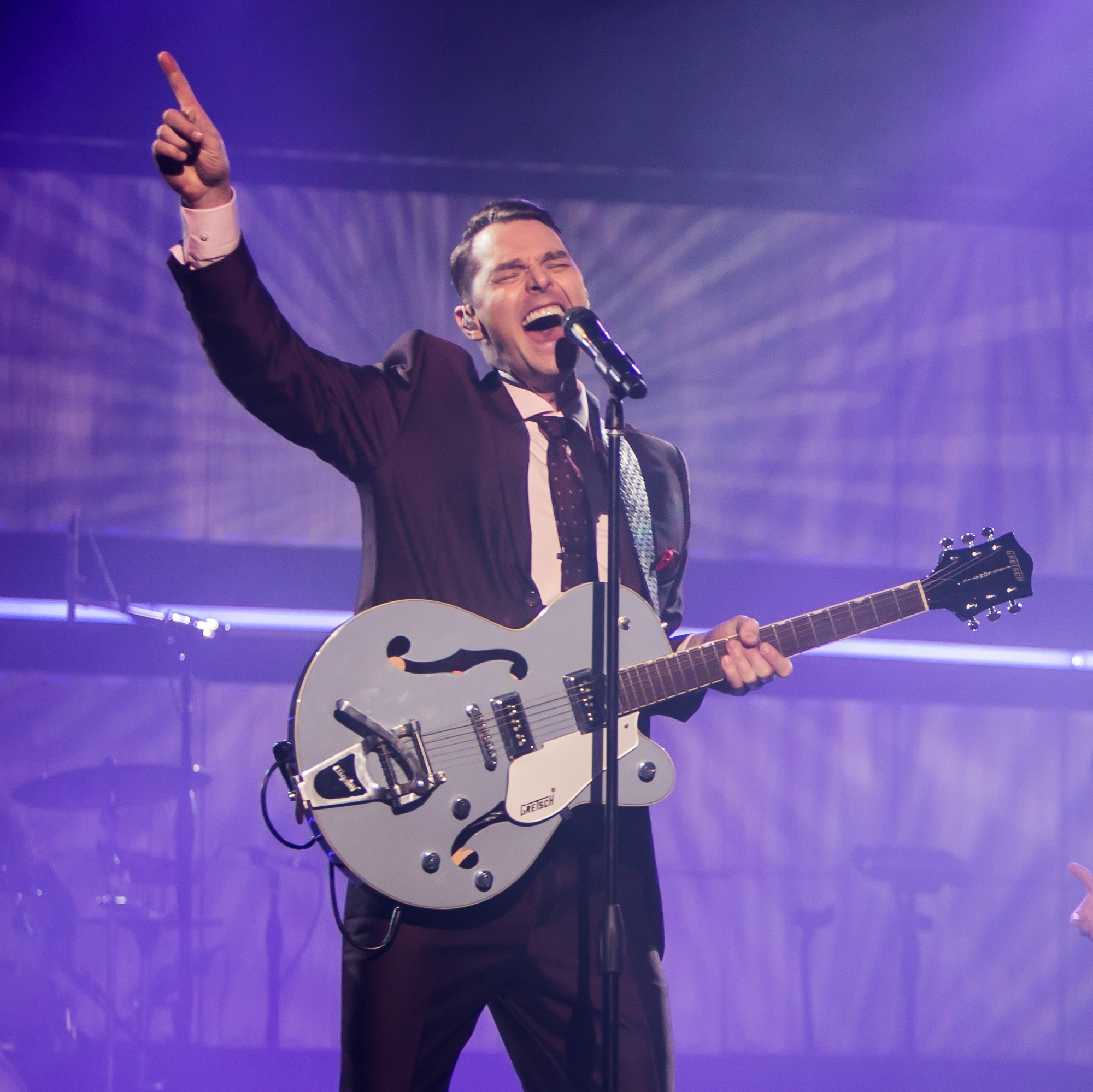
- Wardell with Under the Streetlamp
- Born: Brandon Sean Wardell; March 25, 1975 (age 51) (United States) High Point, North Carolina; U.S.
- Occupations: Actor; theatre producer; singer
- Years active: 1994–present
- Notable work: Singer in Under the Streetlamp, Johnny Dollar in Catch Me If You Can
- Spouse: Sarah Glendening (m. 2008)
- Children: 2

Brandon Sean Wardell (born March 25, 1975) is an American actor, producer, and singer from High Point, North Carolina. He has won a Tony Award from five nominations for his production work in Broadway theater, and has been nominated for four Grammy Awards in his recording career.

Wardell served as a producer for the haunted play Delusion: The Blood Rite, alongside Neil Patrick Harris, his wife Sarah Glendening, and Hollywood stuntman Jon Braver. In 2011, Wardell appeared on Broadway as Agent Johnny Dollar in Catch Me If You Can at the Neil Simon Theatre.

Since 2015 he has performed as part of the touring Doo Wop, Motown, and Rock 'n' Roll man band, Under the Streetlamp. He also serves as the Producing Artistic Director of the group.

== Career ==
Wardell has appeared in productions of Catch Me If You Can, Rent, Evil Dead The Musical (Outer Critics Circle Award nomination), Assassins, Good Vibrations, Thoroughly Modern Millie and James Joyce's The Dead.

Brandon has performed, produced and recorded at a wide variety of venues and events including The Hollywood Bowl, Merlefest, Radio City Music Hall, Stephen Sondheim’s Birthday Celebration at Avery Fisher Hall with the New York Philharmonic, Whisky a Go Go, The Bratislava Symphony Orchestra, John F. Kennedy Center for the Performing Arts and Times Square New Year's Eve Celebration.

His film and television credits include The Devil You Know, Punk'd, Circle of Fury, The Turing Love Affair, The Rooster (Slamdance Film Festival), the 2005 Times Square New Year's Eve Celebration, where he sang live for over a million people, and multiple appearances on The View, All My Children (as Julian), and Guiding Light (guest star).

Brandon is a film, theatre and album Producer in addition to his acting and singing career. His Broadway Producing credits include: Catch Me If You Can, Evita (with Ricky Martin), The Best Man (starring, James Earl Jones and Angela Lansbury), On a Clear Day You Can See Forever (starring Harry Connick, Jr.) and How to Succeed in Business Without Really Trying which opened with Daniel Radcliffe and John Larroquette in the leading roles. Wardell served as a producer for the haunted play Delusion: The Blood Rite, with Neil Patrick Harris, his wife Sarah Glendening, and Hollywood stuntman Jon Braver.

Album Production credits include: cast album of the 2011 revival of How to Succeed in Business Without Really Trying, starring Daniel Radcliffe, Fela!, Annie: 30th Anniversary Cast Recording, Evil Dead: The Musical, Ain't Misbehavin', Gypsy, and Paul Scott Goodman's Rooms.

His Grammy-nominated albums include: How to Succeed, Fela!, Ain't Misbehavin', and The Revival of Gypsy, starring Patti LuPone.
