= Good Vibrations (musical) =

2005 Broadway jukebox musical

- Broadway Playbill
- Music: Brian Wilson, The Beach Boys
- Lyrics: Brian Wilson, The Beach Boys
- Book: Richard Dresser
- Productions: 2005 Broadway

Good Vibrations is a Broadway musical conceived and produced by Nina L. Keneally with Cathleen Murphy and Jamie Lightstone. It was directed by John Carrafa featuring the music of Brian Wilson and The Beach Boys. It opened February 2, 2005, at the Eugene O'Neill Theatre and ran for 94 performances before closing on April 24, 2005. The musical follows the tale of three high school friends who want to escape their small New England town and drive to California. However, none of them own a car, so they invite the unpopular valedictorian girl who has a crush on one of the guys to use her for her car, and drama and romance ensue. The cast on opening night starred Kate Reinders as Caroline, David Larsen as Bobby, Tituss Burgess as Eddie, Brandon Wardell as Dave, Jessica-Snow Wilson as Marcella, David Reiser as Dean and Sebastian Arcelus as Jan. Janet Dacal, Sarah Glendening and Krysta Rodriguez made their Broadway debuts in the show.

== Musical numbers ==
Act one

1. "Our Prayer" – Surfer Guys
2. "Fun, Fun, Fun" – Bobby and Company
3. "Keep an Eye on Summer" – Surfer Guys
4. "Wouldn't It Be Nice" – Eddie, Marcella and Surfer Guys
5. "In My Room" – Caroline, Marcella and High School Kids
6. "I Get Around" – Dave, Bobby, Eddie and Surfer Guys
7. "When I Grow Up (To Be a Man)" – Caroline, Bobby, Dave, Eddie, Marcella and High School Kids
8. "Break Away" – Bobby, Dave, Eddie and Surfer Guys
9. "Don't Worry, Baby" – Caroline, Bobby and High School Kids
10. "Surf City" – Dave, Bobby, Eddie, Caroline and Surfer Guys
11. "Shut Down" – Bobby, Caroline, Dave, Eddie and Surfer Guys
12. "Be True to Your School" – Country Dude and Chili Dog Kids
13. "Car Crazy Cutie" – Bobby, Dave, Eddie and Surfer Guys
14. "The Warmth of the Sun" – Marcella, Caroline and Giggles Girls
15. "Pet Sounds" – Instrumental
16. "Surfin' U.S.A." – Jan, Dean and Beach Kids
17. "Dance, Dance, Dance" – Caroline, Jan and Beach Kids

Act two

1. "California Girls" – Jan, Dean and Beach Kids
2. "Help Me, Rhonda" – Eddie, Bobby, Dave and Beach Guys
3. "Stoked" – Beach Guys
4. "Surfer Girl" – Bobby and Beach Guys
5. "Darlin'" – Jan, Caroline and Beach Kids
6. "Your Imagination" – Caroline and Marcella
7. "Caroline, No" – Bobby
8. "All Summer Long" – Beach Kids
9. "I Just Wasn't Made for These Times" – Dave, Bobby and Eddie
10. "Wouldn't It Be Nice (Reprise)" – Eddie, Marcella and Surfer Guys
11. "Sail On, Sailor" – Eddie, Dean and Beach Kids
12. "Sloop John B" – Jan, Dave and Beach Kids
13. "Friends" – Surfer Guys
14. "Good Vibrations" – Bobby and Company
15. "God Only Knows" – Bobby, Caroline and Company
16. "Finale" – The Company

== Critical reception ==
Good Vibrations received many harshly mixed reviews that condemned its plot as being superficial, predictable and bland, contrived around incorporating as many Beach Boys' songs as possible. Since the songs were not tailor-made for the musical, critics complained that songs did little to progress the plot or give insight into the characters. Therefore, despite an energetic cast and a soulful score of favorite tunes, the general verdict was that Good Vibrations made for a nice concert but a poor example of true musical theatre.
