= Cameron Goodman =

American actress (born 1984)

Cameron Carr
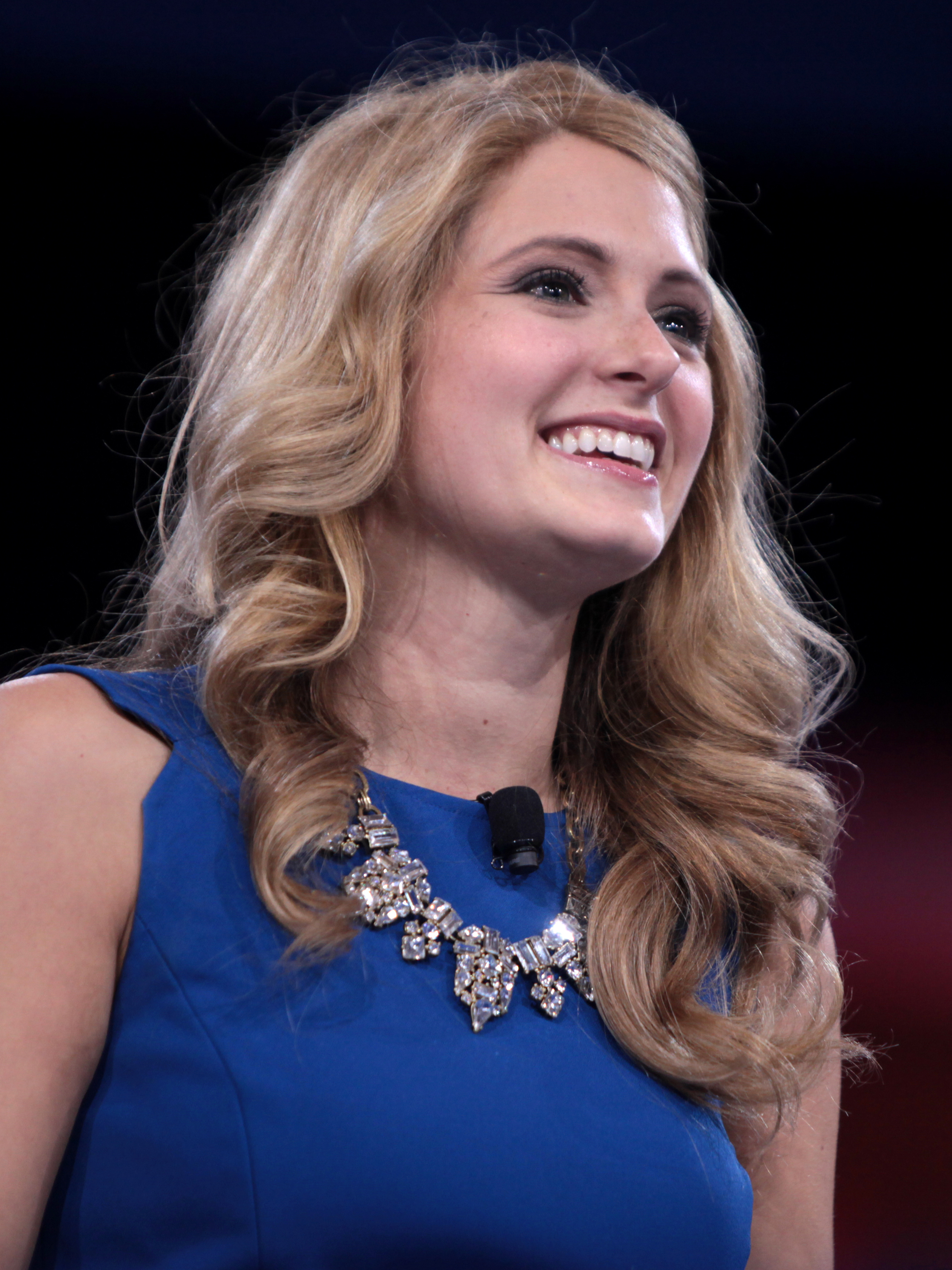
- Cameron Carr in 2016.
- Born: Cameron Elizabeth Goodman; August 24, 1984 (age 42)
- Occupation: Actress
- Years active: 2002–present
- Spouse: Keith Carr (m. 2015)

Cameron Elizabeth Carr (née Goodman; born August 24, 1984) is an American actress.

== Career ==
Carr had guest roles on ABC's Sons & Daughters, CSI: NY, Cold Case, NCIS, The Suite Life of Zack & Cody, as well as a supporting role in the Lucy Liu/Nick Lachey horror/neo-noir movie Rise: Blood Hunter. She was a cast member of Nick Cannon's Wild 'N Out for 2 seasons in 2006. Carr also starred in the 2008 Horror/Thriller, Shuttle in Boston and appeared on MTV's Exposed. She was also featured in the German movie Friendship!

In 2009, she starred as Renny Davidson, the love interest of Kit Walker (Ryan Carnes) in the 2-part The Movie Network/Syfy comic book miniseries The Phantom.

In 2011, Cameron played Amber Lee Adams in the Disney movie Sharpay's Fabulous Adventure alongside Ashley Tisdale, Austin Butler and Lauren Collins. That same year, she landed a recurring role on the CW network hit series, 90210, as a sorority girl named Bree who takes interest in the main character, Annie.

== Personal life ==
In 2015, Goodman married Keith Carr, a real estate agent.

== Filmography ==
=== Films ===
Year	Series	Character	Notes
2014	Summer Snow	Julie Benson	
2014	Ragamuffin	Beth	
2013	O 22º Herdeiro trans. The 22nd Heir	Renny Davidson	Titulo em Portugues para The Phantom 2009 minissérie
2011	Sharpay's Fabulous Adventure	Amber Lee Adams	Disney Channel Original Movie, formerly called High Stakes
2010	Hitched		
2010	The Boys and Girls Guide to Getting Down	Heather	
2010	Love At The Christmas Table	Ashley	
2010	Slam I Am	Miranda	
2010	Taking the Hill: The Warrior's Journey Home	Veteran's Wife	
2010	Action News 5	Daisy	
2010	Speed Daiting	Hilary	
2010	The Dead Undead	Summer	
2010	Father vs. Son	Cinnamon	
2010	Friendship!	Amber	
2010	The Steamroom	Girl in Convertible	
2009	Hurt	Kate	
2009	The Phantom	Renny Davidson	
2009	Friends (With Benefits)	Molly	
2009	An American High School	Jo Awesome	
2009	Stellina Blue	Administrative Asst.	
2009	Serving Time	Cammy	
2009	2 Dudes and a Dream	Heather	
2009	Frozen Kiss	Shelley	
2008	The Informers	Susan Slone	
2008	An American Carol	Political Aide	
2008	Shuttle	Jules	
2007	Rise: Blood Hunter	Kaitlin	
2007	Succubus: Hell Bent	Kitty Cuttie	
2006	The Ron White Animated Show	Ron's Daughter	

=== Television ===
Year	Series	Character	Notes
2011	How to Make It in America	Kirsten	
2011	90210	Bree	Recurring role
2010	The Forgotten	Brandi	Episode: "Train Jane"
2010	The Phantom	Renny Davidson	2 parts, TV miniseries
2009	Disaster Date	-	19 episodes
2009	Phineas and Ferb	Mandy	Episode: "Thaddeus and Thor/De Plane! De Plane!"
2009	The Closer	Erica Whisper Carr	Episode: "Double Blind"
2008	The Cleaner	Sorority Girl # 1	Episode: "Five Little Words"
2008	Sons of Anarchy	Louise Hoffman	Episode: "Pilot"
2008	Mad Men	Tara	Episode: "The Benefactor"
2008	Head Case	Viola Goode	3 episodes
2007	NCIS	Maddie Tyler	Episode: "Requiem"
2007	The Suite Life of Zack & Cody	Hollywood Maddie	2 episodes
2007	Shark	Carol Bonner	Episode: "Trial by Fire"
2006	South of Nowhere	Debbie	2 episodes
2006	Cold Case	Kate Lange	Episode: "Death Penalty: Final Appeal"
2006	Sons & Daughters	Farrah	Episode: "Bowling Night"
2005	CSI: NY	Rose Wilson	Episode: "Jamalot"
