= Angry Video Game Nerd: The Movie =

2014 film by James Rolfe

- Theatrical release poster
- Directed by: Kevin Finn; James Rolfe
- Written by: Kevin Finn; James Rolfe
- Based on: Angry Video Game Nerd by James Rolfe
- Produced by: Sean Keegan
- Starring: James Rolfe; Sarah Glendening; Stephen Mendel; Helena Barrett; Time Winters; Bobby Charles Reed; Jeremy Suarez
- Cinematography: Jason Brewer
- Edited by: Paul Fontaine; Michael Licisyn; James Rolfe
- Music by: Bear McCreary
- Production companies: Cinemassacre Productions; Skinny Ugly Pilgrim; Evil Empire Entertainment
- Distributed by: Indie Rights
- Release date: July 21, 2014
- Running time: 115 minutes
- Country: United States
- Language: English
- Budget: $325,972 (estimated)

Angry Video Game Nerd: The Movie (abbreviated as AVGN: The Movie) is a 2014 American independent science fiction adventure comedy film written and directed by James Rolfe and Kevin Finn in their feature-directorial debuts. It is based on the web series of the same name created by Rolfe, who stars in the lead role. Jeremy Suarez, Sarah Glendening, Stephen Mendel, Time Winters, Helena Barrett, and Robbie Rist are featured in supporting roles.

The story centers around the then urban legend of the mass burial of millions of copies of the 1982 Atari 2600 video game E.T. the Extra-Terrestrial, proclaimed as the "worst video game of all time". After a longstanding refusal to address the game in his web series, the Nerd succumbs to pressure by fans to review the video game, embarking on a quest to prove that there is nothing buried there. However, the crew is pursued by federal authorities, led by the villainous General Dark Onward, who believes he is investigating Area 51 and the crash of an unidentified flying object.

The film was shown on limited release beginning July 21, 2014, followed by initial digital releases on September 2, 2014. It received mixed reviews from critics.

== Plot ==
In 1983, two million copies of the "worst video game of all time", ET for the Atari 2600, are dumped into a landfill outside Alamogordo, New Mexico. In the present day, game executive Mandi of Cockburn Industries, Inc. proposes to her bosses creating a sequel of intentionally poor-quality, titled EeeTee 2. Thanks to the popularity and success of the Angry Video Game Nerd web series, sales of such video games have increased dramatically, and a review of EeeTee 2 by the Nerd would drive his fans to buy the game.

Meanwhile, the Nerd and his sidekick Cooper Folly are working on a video game review. The Nerd has become disheartened over the years, as his fans continue to buy and play the games he reviews and warns people to stay away from. On top of this, the Nerd must promote and sell bad video games as part of his job at GameCops. When he discovers marketing for EeeTee 2, his fans encourage him to review ET, something he has stood against for years because the game scarred him as a child. After some personal thought, the Nerd decides to go to Alamogordo to debunk the conspiracy theory surrounding the buried cartridges, promising to review the game if the theory proves to be true. He is accompanied by Cooper and Mandi, and the trip is completely funded by Cockburn Industries.

While filming their expedition, Cooper reveals that he believes in a super-being known as Death Mwauthzyx, who has the power to destroy all existence. Sergeant McButter and the legless General Dark Onward, thinking the trio is looking for extraterrestrials, attempt to capture them. Onward accidentally blows his right arm off with a grenade, giving the trio enough time to escape.

The Nerd, Cooper and Mandi search for the creator of ET, Howard Scott Warshaw, for answers. They instead stumble across the home of Dr. Zandor, who tells them that ET's level design is an exact map of Area 51. Dr. Zandor gave the code to Warshaw to help him meet the five-week deadline Atari set for ET's completion, and to exact revenge on the government for kidnapping and holding hostage an alien he was attempting to free. The government ordered the burial of the cartridges, while Zandor escaped with the metallic material Area 51 was researching at the time in an attempt to reassemble the alien's spaceship, replacing it with tin foil. Mandi is captured by McButter while wandering outside of the house. The Nerd and Cooper, believing she is a double agent, do not go after her.

Going back to the Alamogordo site, the Nerd and Cooper discover a large crowd of fans and the head of Cockburn Industries promoting the release of EeeTee 2 with the promise of digging out a copy of the original ET from the site. The Nerd tells his fans there are no cartridges buried there, but Warshaw himself appears and tells fans the opposite. Annoyed, the Nerd breaks into Area 51 disguised as an alien. He is captured, and General Onward attempts to force him to play ET. Onward launches a missile at Mount Fuji, the basis for the Atari logo, and while leaving the room, gets his left arm cut off in the door. During the launch countdown, an alien resembling the one in ET grabs the Nerd and pulls him to safety.

The destruction of Mount Fuji releases Death Mwauthzyx, who was trapped inside the mountain. Meanwhile, Mandi keeps McButter away from the Nerd and Cooper's location, eventually leading them to a confrontation on the Eiffel Tower in Las Vegas.

The Nerd and alien escape in a fighter jet similar to one in the NES Top Gun video game, while the alien reveals Death Mwauthzyx can destroy all existence by turning the satellite dish on his head. Cooper is captured by Death Mwauthzyx and brought to Las Vegas, where Mandi knocks McButter off the Eiffel Tower to her death. Mandi is also captured by Death Mwauthzyx. The Nerd and Alien crash-land at the Alamogordo site, where a captured Dr. Zandor shouts to them that he hid the alien's spaceship metal inside the millions of ET game cartridges. Alien summons every single copy of the game to form the spaceship. The Nerd and Alien leave for Las Vegas to stop Death Mwauthzyx. The limbless General Onward is killed when attempting to stop them.

The Nerd fires a laser at Death Mwauthzyx's satellite dish, with the laser bouncing around inside of it before being shot into space where it seemingly comes across many mysteries of the universe, and somehow returns to strike the satellite dish again. Afterwards, Death Mwauthzyx puts on a pair of Groucho Marx glasses and nose, laughs and flies away from the Earth. The group returns to the Alamogordo site and reunite with Dr. Zandor and the Nerd's fans. Cooper and Mandi share a kiss, and then the Nerd reviews EeeTee 2. Afterwards, the Nerd finally reviews the original Atari 2600 ET during the end credits for his fans, then delivers a heartfelt message about classic games and not-so-classic games, before the Alien leaves for good.

== Cast ==
- James Rolfe as the Nerd
- Jeremy Suarez as Cooper
- Sarah Glendening as Mandi
- Stephen Mendel as General Dark Onward
- Helena Barrett as Sergeant McButter
- Time Winters as Dr. Zandor
- Bobby Charles Reed as Bernie Cockburn
- Robbie Rist as Alien (voice)
- Matt Conant as Death Mwauthzyx
- Howard Scott Warshaw as himself
- Matt Brewer as Young Zandor
- Kyle Justin as Guitar Guy
- Mike Matei as himself
- Doug Walker as himself
- David Dastmalchian as Sergeant L.J. Ng

== Development and release ==
The film's budget of more than US$325,000 was secured entirely via Internet crowdfunding on the website Indiegogo, contributing to the platform's popularity. It premiered on July 21, 2014, at Grauman's Egyptian Theatre in Hollywood, followed by a limited release in theaters through July and August 2014 in the United States. The film released online through video-on-demand on September 2, 2014. The Blu-ray version of the film was released on December 14, 2014, with the DVD version released on May 13, 2015.

On November 15, 2024, Angry Video Game Nerd: The Movie was made available to rent and purchase digitally on YouTube Movies, Amazon Prime Video, Google Play Movies, Apple TV and Fandango at Home.

=== Soundtrack ===
The film's score was composed by Bear McCreary, who had previously worked with Rolfe on the web series Christmas special "How The Nerd Stole Christmas". McCreary utilized rock-and-roll music, heavy metal music, a symphonic orchestra, and synthesized elements from NES, SNES, and Sega Genesis hardware to compose the score. The album features two remixes by McCreary, as well as two songs written by his brother Brendan McCreary and performed by his band Young Beautiful in a Hurry. The album was released on the iTunes Store on September 2, 2014.

In an interview with BeardedGentlemenMusic, McCreary states: "Over the years I’ve made all these custom samples emulating the sounds of NES hardware. I always wanted to be able to recreate those sounds I love but I didn't really have a place to put them you know? So when working on that movie with James, not only did I have the opportunity to do a cinematic score, but I also had a place to use all those sounds from my youth and write an actual score but use the sounds of the 8-bit Nintendo era, the Sega Genesis, and the Super Nintendo! It was quite literally a childhood dream coming true! I'm grateful to James for that opportunity."

All music was composed by McCreary, except where otherwise noted.

Angry Video Game Nerd: The Movie (Original Motion Picture Soundtrack)

Film score by Bear McCreary
- Released: September 2, 2014
- Recorded: 2014
- Genre: Various
- Length: 1:19:00

No.	Title	Performer	Length
1.	"Theme from Angry Video Game Nerd: The Movie"		4:41
2.	"Nerds Before Birds"	Young Beautiful in a Hurry	3:55
3.	"Nerd Nightmares"		3:42
4.	"The Landfill"		1:54
5.	"Humvee Chase"		2:43
6.	"Barcade"	Young Beautiful in a Hurry	2:44
7.	"The Story of Death Mwauthzyx"		1:54
8.	"Save the Fans"		3:31
9.	"Zandor's Tale"		4:07
10.	"Howard Scott Warshaw"		4:43
11.	"Sacred Ground of the Golden Turd (Bear McCreary Remix)"	Kyle Justin	2:16
12.	"General Dark Onward"		5:50
13.	"Unidentified Flying Nerd"		2:56
14.	"Killer Robots"		2:25
15.	"Death Mwauthzyx Rises"		5:44
16.	"The Nerdy Hero"		10:15
17.	"Birds Before Nerds"		2:28
18.	"Source Music Medley"		5:31
19.	"Maverick Regeneration"		4:11
20.	"The Angry Video Game Nerd Theme Song (Bear McCreary Remix)"	Kyle Justin	2:54
Total length:			1:19:00

== Reception ==
Angry Video Game Nerd: The Movie received mixed reviews from critics. The Hollywood Reporter called it an "overly long and almost obsessively self-indulgent" and "aspiring cult film" with production value which "hovers above home-video quality by a few admirable notches", noting that the "filmmakers manage to capably anchor these disparate storylines to their central plot concerning crusading gamers."

The Michigan Daily student newspaper of the University of Michigan gave the film a mostly negative review, describing it as unfunny, poorly edited, badly paced, and too long. This review argued that the soundtrack by Bear McCreary was good and the best aspect of the film. The reviewer noted that The Angry Video Game Nerd was "the pioneering internet 'gamer' show," which he had enjoyed greatly, so the film was a "disappointing failure."

Kevin T. Rodriguez of iCritic gave the film a positive review while acknowledging the lack of accessibility for non-fans of the character, writing: "Yes, it's uneven at times. In fact, I would argue that there is probably some fifteen minutes of footage in here that could be cut from the film that would result in better pacing. I suspect that the people who see this movie won't have the problems most people who watch movies would have though. It lives in its own little bubble, mining comedy from the most unlikely of sources and fully embracing the silliness of the whole affair. Rolfe may not be the most versatile actor I've seen but it's clear that he has created a memorable character and has mastered facial expressions for great comedic effect."

== See also ==
- List of films featuring extraterrestrials
