= Provocateur (film) =

1997 film directed by Jim Donovan

- Directed by: Jim Donovan
- Written by: Roger Kumble
- Starring: Lillo Brancato Jr.; Jane March; Stephen Mendel
- Cinematography: John Handler
- Edited by: Jean Francois-Bergeron
- Music by: Mark Nakamura; Mark Shannon
- Release date: May 19, 1998
- Running time: 103 minutes
- Country: United States
- Language: English

Provocateur (also released on video as Agent Provocateur) is a 1997 American drama film directed by Jim Donovan, written by Roger Kumble, and starring Lillo Brancato Jr. and Jane March. The original score was written by Mark Nakamura and Mark Shannon.

March plays Sook Hee, a mixed-race ("honhyol") North Korean agent who ingratiates herself into the household of Colonel Greg Finn (Stephen Mendel), stationed in South Korea, to access military secrets. While working as Finn's servant, Sook becomes acquainted with his son Chris (Brancato), and they fall in love.
