= Shuttle (film) =

- Theatrical release poster
- Directed by: Edward Anderson
- Written by: Edward Anderson
- Produced by: Mark Donadio; Mark Williams; Michael A. Pierce; Allan Jones
- Starring: Peyton List; Cameron Goodman; Cullen Douglas; Dave Power; James Snyder; Tony Curran
- Cinematography: Michael Fimognari
- Edited by: William Yeh
- Music by: Henning Lohner
- Distributed by: Magnolia Pictures
- Release dates: March 8, 2008 (SXSW); March 6, 2009
- Running time: 106 minutes
- Country: United States
- Language: English

Shuttle is a 2008 American thriller film about a group of young travelers who are kidnapped by an airport shuttle driver with unknown motives. The film was written and directed by Edward Anderson, and it stars Tony Curran, Peyton List, and Cameron Goodman.

Shuttle premiered at South by Southwest on March 8, 2008 in Austin, Texas. The film opened theatrically in limited release in the United States on March 6, 2009.

== Plot ==
Mel and her best friend Jules return from a trip to Mexico. At the airport they meet two fellow travellers, Seth and Matt. When Mel learns her luggage is missing and must be collected the next day, the group accepts a cut-price ride from a shuttle-bus driver. Another passenger, Andy, a quiet family man, joins them.

The trip grows ominous when the driver takes a strange route and the bus is forced off the road by another car. The driver discovers a flat tyre, and with no mobile reception Matt offers to help. The bus slips off the jack and crushes his hand, severing several fingers. Claiming he is taking them to a hospital, the driver instead pulls over, produces a gun, and robs everyone of phones and wallets. When the passengers resist, he slashes Seth’s face with a knife and warns them to cooperate.

He forces Jules into an enclosed ATM to withdraw cash. Jules starts a small fire to trigger an alarm and locks herself inside, but the driver compels Mel to return by threatening to let Jules suffocate from smoke. At a supermarket, he orders Mel to buy supplies; she tries to signal for help by using sign language into a CCTV camera and slipping a note to a clerk to review the footage. Seth later breaks free and runs, but the driver kills him by running him over with the bus.

Mel has hidden a knife in a bag of ice bought at the store. She cuts the others’ restraints, and Matt smashes a window to shout for help. In the struggle that follows, Mel cuts the driver’s wrist, seizes his gun, and forces him to unlock Jules and Andy. With the driver restrained, Mel drives the bus while the others keep watch.

Andy suddenly stabs Matt in the throat and takes the gun, revealing he is working with the driver. The pair dispose of Seth and Matt’s bodies at a bridge and continue their trip, tormenting the women. Mel retrieves a tyre iron and attacks Andy, forcing the bus to stop. She regains control and, during another fight, strikes Andy with a fire extinguisher; the bus crashes, leaving Andy dead and Mel and the driver unconscious.

Jules wakes and flags down a passing car, but while she is on the phone to 911, the driver comes to and runs over the would-be rescuer with the bus. He takes the women to a warehouse, where he burns off Jules’ tattoo and keeps their driving licences in a drawer already filled with other victims’ IDs. He forces Jules to dye Mel’s hair blonde and makes them change into underwear and white high heels for an “inspection” by an associate—the same man who earlier forced the bus off the road and had been watching them at the airport. The driver searches their bags and finds Jules carrying antifungal medication for a yeast infection; declaring her unsuitable because he needs victims in perfect health, he kills her by gassing the bus with carbon monoxide.

Mel threatens to cut her face with broken glass so she cannot be trafficked. She injures the driver, recovers his gun, and shoots him, believing she has killed him, but he survives and overpowers her. He locks her inside a large wooden crate packed with the supplies she was forced to buy: a flashlight, bread, water, magazines, kitty litter, a litter box, and her motion-sickness pills. A forklift operator arrives and is revealed to be another accomplice. As the crate is moved, Mel finds a photograph of seven naked young women with dyed hair and white high heels, implying an organised trafficking operation. The crate is loaded onto a cargo ship bound for Asia. The next day, Mel’s missing luggage finally turns up at the airport.

== Critical reception ==
The film received mixed reviews from critics. On the review aggregator website Rotten Tomatoes, 52% of 21 critics' reviews are positive. The website's consensus reads: "While this debut by Edward Anderson is economical and occasionally effective, Shuttle offers little catharsis after its tense ride."
