= Peyton List (actress, born 1986) =

American actress (born 1986)

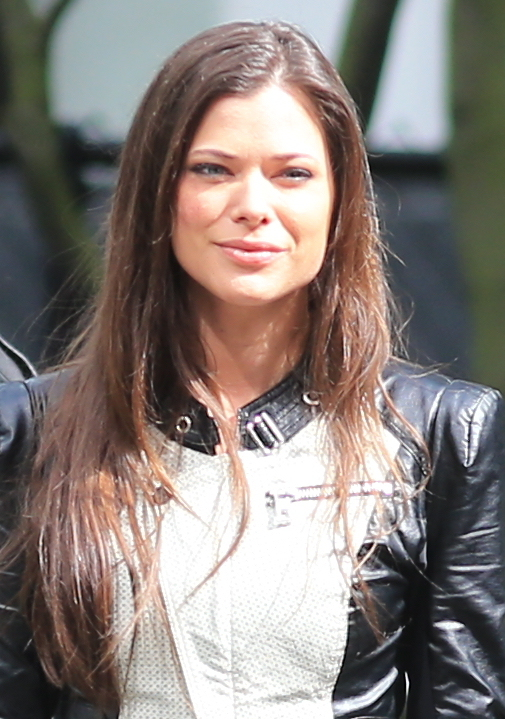
- List in 2014
- Born: August 8, 1986 (age 40); Boston, Massachusetts, U.S.
- Occupation: Actress
- Years active: 2000–present

Peyton List (born August 8, 1986) is an American actress. She started her career on daytime television, playing Lucy Montgomery on the CBS soap opera As the World Turns from 2001 to 2005, before transitioning to primetime with regular roles on the short-lived dramas Windfall (2006) and Big Shots (2007).

From 2008 to 2013, List had a recurring role as Jane Siegel in the AMC drama Mad Men. In film, she has appeared in The Greatest Game Ever Played (2005), Shuttle (2009) and Meeting Evil (2012). List also starred in the short-lived science fiction dramas FlashForward (ABC, 2009–2010), and The Tomorrow People (The CW, 2013–2014). During the 2016–17 television season, she portrayed the lead character in The CW drama series Frequency. In 2018, she had a recurring role in season 3 of the science fiction series Colony. She also starred on a recurring basis as Poison Ivy in the Fox crime drama series Gotham (2018–2019), and voiced the character in the 2019 animated film Batman: Hush.

== Early life ==
Peyton List was born on August 8, 1986, in Boston, to Douglas List and Sherri Anderson and grew up in Baltimore, Maryland, with her sister Brittany. She went to preschool at Cedarcroft pre-school in Kennett Square, Pennsylvania and Calvert School in Baltimore, and then attended the Roland Park Country School in Baltimore. She studied ballet at the School of American Ballet on the Upper West Side in Manhattan, New York City.

== Career ==
At nine, she began a career as a model. Her first significant commercial appearance was with her sister as one of the "daughters next door" in Washington Square. List had a minor role in the HBO television series Sex and the City in 2000. In 2001, she had a small part in an episode of Law & Order: Special Victims Unit, and began a three year run as Lucy Montgomery on the CBS soap opera As the World Turns. She left the soap opera in 2005 and later appeared as Lucy Lane in an episode of Smallville, and reprised her role on the final season in 2010. In the same year, she guest-starred on Without a Trace, CSI: Miami, CSI: NY, and One Tree Hill.

In 2006, List was a series regular on the NBC drama Windfall, as Tally Reida. The series was canceled after one season, and List had a recurring role on the short-lived ABC drama Day Break. During the 2007 pilot season, List was cast in another ABC series, Big Shots, in which she played the role of Cameron Collinsworth, daughter of Dylan McDermott's character. The series also was canceled after one season. List also guest-starred on several television shows, including Moonlight, Ghost Whisperer, CSI: Crime Scene Investigation, Monk, Hawaii Five-0, and House of Lies. From 2008 to 2013, List appeared in a recurring role on the AMC series Mad Men, playing Don Draper's fill-in secretary who later became Roger Sterling's second wife. From 2009 to 2010, List starred on another ABC series FlashForward, as Nicole Kirby. In film, she appeared in The Greatest Game Ever Played (2005), Shuttle (2008), and Meeting Evil (2011).

In 2013, List was cast in the female lead role of Cara Coburn on The CW series The Tomorrow People. The series was canceled after a single season. A year later, she had recurring roles in the CW series The Flash and in ABC's short-lived prime time soap opera Blood & Oil. In 2016, she was cast as lead character in the CW science fiction police drama Frequency. In October 2017, she was cast as Ivy Pepper, also known as Poison Ivy, in the Fox drama series Gotham, taking over the part from Maggie Geha and Clare Foley who preceded her.

== Namefellow ==
List shares the same name with a fellow actress, Peyton List, born in 1998. The younger List was interviewed by Access Hollywood, saying she uses Peyton R. List to avoid confusion. Union SAG-AFTRA's policy prohibits actors with the same name; however, this instance of identical professional names went unnoticed due to the older List using her middle name to sign up with SAG-AFTRA and the younger one using her first name.

They appeared in the same scene when the older List starred on As the World Turns as Lucy Montgomery. Years later, the younger List cited confusion when they stayed at the same hotel; they received daily call sheets and voicemails for each other. IndieWire noted that the mix-ups have appeared on Wikipedia, where both actresses' articles started out with exactly the same introduction text of: "Peyton List is an American actress and model." Both actresses provided voice performances for Batman: Hush (2019).

== Filmography ==
=== Film ===
Year	Title	Role	Notes
2005	The Greatest Game Ever Played	Sarah Wallis	
2008	Shuttle	Mel	
2008	Deep Winter	Elisa Rider	
2011	Low Fidelity	Georgia	
2012	Meeting Evil	Tammy Strate	
2014	Playing It Cool	Hot Girl	
2019	Batman: Hush	Pamela Isley / Poison Ivy	Voice role
2023	Spinning Gold	Nancy Weiss-Reingold	

=== Television ===
Year	Title	Role	Notes
2001, 2003	Law & Order: Special Victims Unit	Patsy / Chloe Dutton	Episodes: "Pixies", "Soulless"
2001–2005	As the World Turns	Lucy Montgomery	Series regular Nominated—Soap Opera Digest Award for Favorite New Couple (2005)
2005, 2010	Smallville	Lucy Lane	Episodes: "Lucy", "Ambush"
2005	Just Legal	Paradise Colvin	Episode: Pilot
2005	Without a Trace	Dina Kingston	Episode: "From the Ashes"
2005	CSI: Miami	Alexa Endecott	Episode: "Felony Flight"
2005	CSI: NY	Alexa Endecott	Episode: "Manhattan Manhunt"
2006	One Tree Hill	Solaris	Episode: "All Tomorrow's Parties"
2006	Windfall	Tally Reida	Main role
2006	Day Break	Ava	3 episodes
2007–2008	Big Shots	Cameron Collinsworth	Main role
2008–2013	Mad Men	Jane Siegel	Recurring role, 15 episodes
2008	Moonlight	Tierney Taylor	Episode: "Click"
2008	Ghost Whisperer	Lorelei / Georgia Kent	Episode: "Save Our Souls"
2008	CSI: Crime Scene Investigation	Michelle Tournay	Episode: "Leave Out All the Rest"
2009	Monk	Tanya Adams	Episode: "Mr. Monk and the Magician"
2009–2010	FlashForward	Nicole Kirby	Main role
2010	Hawaii Five-0	Erica Harris	Episode: "Palekeiko"
2011	Charlie's Angels	Zoe Sinclair / Oswald	Episode: "Black Hat Angels"
2012	House of Lies	Britney	Episode: "Bareback Town"
2012	90210	Lindsey Beckwith	4 episodes
2013–2014	The Tomorrow People	Cara Coburn	Main role
2015	The Flash	Lisa Snart / Golden Glider	3 episodes
2015	Blood & Oil	Emma Lundergren	Recurring role, 6 episodes
2016–2017	Frequency	Raimy Sullivan	Main role
2017	Law & Order: Special Victims Unit	Margery Evans	Episode: "The Newsroom"
2018–2019	Gotham	Ivy Pepper / Poison Ivy	Recurring role (seasons 4–5)
2018	Colony	Amy Leonard	Recurring role
2020–2022	Charmed	Nadia	4 episodes
2020	Star Trek: Picard	Narissa / Lieutenant Rizzo	Recurring role (season 1)
2020–present	The Rookie	Gennifer Bradford	Recurring role (season 4–present), 5 episodes
2021	Blade Runner: Black Lotus	Josephine Grant	Main voice role
2022	A Maple Valley Christmas	Erica Holden	Hallmark Television film
2024	NCIS Hawaii	Camille Davies	Episode: "Serve and Protect"
2024	9-1-1: Lone Star	Ashlyn Campbell	Episode: "Fall From Grace"
2026	We Were Liars	Young Tipper Taft Sinclair	Season 2

=== Music video ===
Year	Title	Role	Artist
2011	"If I Had a Gun..."	Bride	Noel Gallagher's High Flying Birds
2012	"Amazing Eyes"	Girlfriend	Good Old War
