= Jeremy Suarez =

American actor (born 1990)

- Born: Jeremy Steven Suarez; July 6, 1990 (age 36); Burbank, California, U.S.
- Occupation: Actor
- Years active: 1995–present
- Spouse: Maria Suarez (m. 2017)

Jeremy Steven Suarez (born July 6, 1990) is an American actor, best known for his role as Jordan Thomkins on The Bernie Mac Show (2001–2006), and as the voice of Koda in Brother Bear (2003) and Brother Bear 2 (2006).

Beginning his career as a child actor at the age of five, he first appeared as Tyson Tidwell in Jerry Maguire (1996), and most recently appeared as Nathaniel in The Fix (2017). Throughout his career, Suarez has been nominated for two NAACP Image Awards, two Young Artist Awards and an Annie Award.

== Biography ==
Suarez is of African and Cuban descent, and is the oldest of three siblings. He was raised Muslim.

In 1996, he made his debut in Jerry Maguire as Rod Tidwell's son Tyson. He appeared in the short-lived sitcom Built to Last (1997) as Ryce Watkins, the youngest son in a family of seven. Suarez made guest appearances on sitcoms Sister, Sister (1996) and The Wayans Bros. (1998), and had a recurring role as Raymond Wilkes on medical drama Chicago Hope (1996−98).

When Suarez was 11 years old, he joined the cast of the sitcom The Bernie Mac Show (2001−06) as Jordan Tompkins, the nephew of the titular character Bernie Mac. For portraying Jordan, Suarez received two NAACP Image Award nominations. Suarez appeared on Larry King Live in 2008 with his fellow cast to discuss Mac's death.

He voiced Koda, a bear cub whose mother was killed by the protagonist, in the Disney film Brother Bear (2003). A book author believed Suarez's performance was the best in the film. Suarez received an Annie Award nomination for Outstanding Achievement for Voice Acting in a Feature Production as Koda, but lost to Ellen DeGeneres. He reprised the role of Koda in sequel Brother Bear 2 (2006).

In 2004, Suarez appeared in two feature films. He provided the voice of Russell in an animated sequence of Fat Albert and portrayed Li'l Gawain in The Ladykillers. Following the end of The Bernie Mac Show, Suarez struggled to find acting work and found employment in more conventional jobs outside of the film industry, including as a boilermaker.

Most of Suarez's work post-Bernie Mac have been in voice-overs, guest starring on King of the Hill and voicing a puppet in Nike commercials during the 2009 NBA Playoffs. He provided Kai's voice in the animated feature film, Zambezia (2012). In Angry Video Game Nerd: The Movie (2014), Suarez played Cooper Folly, the nerd's sidekick.

== Filmography ==
Film
Year	Title	Role	Notes
1996	Jerry Maguire	Tyson Tidwell	
1998	Susan's Plan	Kevin	
2001	The Land Before Time VIII: The Big Freeze	Tippy	Voice, direct-to-video
2002	Treasure Planet	Alien Kid, additional voices	Voice (deleted scenes)
2003	Brother Bear	Koda	Voice
2004	The Ladykillers	Li'l Gawain	
2004	Fat Albert	Russell	Voice
2005	Room to Grow	Teasel	Short
2006	Brother Bear 2	Koda	Voice, direct-to-video
2008	Extreme Movie	RJ	
2012	Zambezia	Kai	Voice
2014	Angry Video Game Nerd: The Movie	Cooper Folly	
2017	The Fix	Nathaniel	

Television
Year	Title	Role	Notes
1996	Sister, Sister	Little Boy	Episode: Kid-Napped
1996–98	Chicago Hope	Raymond Wilkes	6 episodes
1997	Built to Last	Ryce Watkins	8 episodes
1998	The Wayans Bros.	Dexter	Episode: The Son of Marlon
1998	Beverly Hills, 90210	Ryan	Episode: Local Hero
2000	MADtv	Cowboy Trick or Treater	2 episodes
2001	Max Steel	Nuebert	Voice, episode: "Fun in the Sun"
2001–06	The Bernie Mac Show	Jordan Thomkins	104 episodes
2002	Hey Arnold!	Scared Boy	Voice, episode: "The Journal"
2005	The Proud Family Movie	Wally	Voice, television film
2007–08	King of the Hill	Arrow Kid #1, Jack	Voice, 3 episodes

== Awards and nominations ==
Year	Award	Category	Work	Result
2003	Image Award	Outstanding Supporting Actor in a Comedy Series	The Bernie Mac Show	Nominated
2004	Image Award	Outstanding Supporting Actor in a Comedy Series	The Bernie Mac Show	Nominated
2004	BET Comedy Award	Outstanding Supporting Actor in a Comedy Series	The Bernie Mac Show	Nominated
2004	Young Artist Award	Best Performance in a TV Series (Comedy or Drama) – Leading Young Actor	The Bernie Mac Show	Nominated
2004	Annie Award	Outstanding Voice Acting in an Animated Feature Production	Brother Bear	Nominated
2004	Young Artist Award	Best Performance in a Voice-Over Role – Young Actor	Brother Bear	Nominated
2005	BET Comedy Award	Outstanding Supporting Actor in a Comedy Series	The Bernie Mac Show	Nominated

== See also ==
- List of Afro-Latinos
