= List of NCIS characters =

NCIS is an American police procedural television series, revolving around a fictional team of special agents from the Naval Criminal Investigative Service, which investigates crimes involving the U.S. Navy and Marine Corps. The series was created by Donald P. Bellisario and Don McGill as a backdoor pilot with the season eight episodes "Ice Queen" and "Meltdown" of JAG. The series premiered on September 23, 2003, featuring an ensemble cast, which has included: Mark Harmon, Sasha Alexander, Michael Weatherly, Pauley Perrette, David McCallum, Sean Murray, Cote de Pablo, Lauren Holly, Rocky Carroll, Brian Dietzen, Emily Wickersham, Wilmer Valderrama, Jennifer Esposito, Duane Henry, Maria Bello, Diona Reasonover, Katrina Law, and Gary Cole.

== Overview ==
=== Main characters ===
Key
R	Recurring
G	Guest

Character	Actor	Season																							
Character	Actor	1	2	3	4	5	6	7	8	9	10	11	12	13	14	15	16	17	18	19	20	21	22	23	24
Leroy Jethro Gibbs	Mark Harmon	Main	Main	Main	Main	Main	Main	Main	Main	Main	Main	Main	Main	Main	Main	Main	Main	Main	Main	Main	—	—	—	—	—
Caitlin "Kate" Todd	Sasha Alexander	Main	Main	G	—	—	—	—	G (Note: Sasha Alexander appeared in an uncredited voice role in the season eight episode "A Man Walks Into a Bar..." via deleted scenes from earlier seasons and recorded a voice-over specifically for this episode. She later appeared in "Life Before His Eyes" using digitally manipulated CGI footage from the season 2 episode "SWAK".)	G	—	—	G (Note: Sasha Alexander appeared in flashbacks within the season 12 episode "House Rules", and during "The Lost Boys" using digitally manipulated CGI footage taken from the season 1 episode "Reveille".)	—	—	—	—	—	—	—	—	—	—	—	—
Anthony "Tony" DiNozzo Jr.	Michael Weatherly	Main	Main	Main	Main	Main	Main	Main	Main	Main	Main	Main	Main	Main	—	—	—	—	—	—	—	G	—	—	Main
Abigail "Abby" Sciuto	Pauley Perrette	Main	Main	Main	Main	Main	Main	Main	Main	Main	Main	Main	Main	Main	Main	Main	—	—	—	—	—	—	—	—	—
Dr. Donald "Ducky" Mallard	David McCallum	Main (Note: David McCallum died in September 2023, with his final appearance being "Black Sky" (20.22). McCallum remains credited for the first two episodes of season 21.)	Main	Main	Main	Main	Main	Main	Main	Main	Main	Main	Main	Main	Main	Main	Main	Main	Main	Main	Main	—	—	—	—
Timothy "Tim" McGee	Sean Murray	R	Main	Main	Main	Main	Main	Main	Main	Main	Main	Main	Main	Main	Main	Main	Main	Main	Main	Main	Main	Main	Main	Main	Main
Ziva David	Cote de Pablo	—	—	Main (Note: Cote de Pablo is credited as a "Starring" from "Silver War" (3.04) through "Past, Present, and Future" (11.02). In "Kill Ari" (3.01 & 3.02) she is credited as "Guest Starring".)	Main	Main	Main	Main	Main	Main	Main	Main	—	—	—	—	G	R (Note: Cote de Pablo is credited as Special Guest Star.)	—	—	—	—	—	—	—
Jenny Shepard	Lauren Holly	—	—	Main (Note: Lauren Holly is credited as "Starring" from "Frame Up" (3.09) through "Judgment Day (Part II) (5.19). From "Kill Ari" (3.01) through "Under Covers" (3.08) she is credited as "Guest Starring" in the episodes she appears.)	Main	Main	—	—	G (Note: Lauren Holly appeared in the season eight episode "A Man Walks Into a Bar..." via flashback, and in the season 9 episode "Life Before His Eyes" using digitally manipulated CGI footage from the season 5 episode "Judgment Day".)	G	—	—	G (Note: Lauren Holly appeared in flashbacks within the season 12 episodes "House Rules" and "Check". She also appeared in the episode "The Lost Boys" using digitally manipulated CGI footage from the season 5 episode "Judgment Day".)	—	—	—	—	—	—	—	—	—	—	—	—
Leon Vance	Rocky Carroll	—	—	—	—	R	Main	Main	Main	Main	Main	Main	Main	Main	Main	Main	Main	Main	Main	Main	Main	Main	Main	Main	—
Dr. James "Jimmy" Palmer	Brian Dietzen	R (Note: Brian Dietzen was credited as "guest starring" in seasons one through five and "also starring" credits in seasons six through nine.)	R	R	R	R	R	R	R	R	Main	Main	Main	Main	Main	Main	Main	Main	Main	Main	Main	Main	Main	Main	Main
Eleanor "Ellie" Bishop	Emily Wickersham	—	—	—	—	—	—	—	—	—	—	Main (Note: Emily Wickersham was credited as "guest starring" from "Gut Check" (11.09) through "Homesick" (11.11) and was promoted to "Starring" from "Kill Chain" (11.12) through "Rule 91" (18.16).)	Main	Main	Main	Main	Main	Main	Main	—	—	—	—	G	—
Nicholas "Nick" Torres	Wilmer Valderrama	—	—	—	—	—	—	—	—	—	—	—	—	—	Main	Main	Main	Main	Main	Main	Main	Main	Main	Main	Main
Alexandra "Alex" Quinn	Jennifer Esposito	—	—	—	—	—	—	—	—	—	—	—	—	—	Main	—	—	—	—	—	—	—	—	—	—
Clayton Reeves	Duane Henry	—	—	—	—	—	—	—	—	—	—	—	—	G	Main	Main	—	—	—	—	—	—	—	—	—
Dr. Jacqueline "Jack" Sloane	Maria Bello	—	—	—	—	—	—	—	—	—	—	—	—	—	—	Main (Note: Maria Bello was credited as "special guest star" in "Skeleton Crew" (15.04) and was promoted to "starring" from "Fake It 'Til You Make It" (15.05) through "True Believer" (18.08).)	Main	Main	Main	—	—	—	—	—	—
Kasie Hines	Diona Reasonover	—	—	—	—	—	—	—	—	—	—	—	—	—	—	R	Main	Main	Main	Main	Main	Main	Main	Main	Main
Jessica "Jess" Knight	Katrina Law	—	—	—	—	—	—	—	—	—	—	—	—	—	—	—	—	—	G	Main	Main	Main	Main	Main	Main
Alden Parker	Gary Cole	—	—	—	—	—	—	—	—	—	—	—	—	—	—	—	—	—	—	Main (Note: Gary Cole was credited as "also starring" in "Nearly Departed" (19.02) and was promoted to "starring" in "Road to Nowhere" (19.03).)	Main	Main	Main	Main	Main

==== Table notes ====
Character	Actor	Rank/position	Seasons			First episode	Last episode	No. of episodes (credited)	Notes
Character	Actor	Rank/position	Regular	Recurring	Guest	First episode	Last episode	No. of episodes (credited)	Notes
Leroy Jethro Gibbs	Mark Harmon	NCIS Supervisory Special Agent / Marine Gunnery Sergeant	1–19			"Yankee White" (1.01)	"Great Wide Open" (19.04)	435	
Caitlin "Kate" Todd	Sasha Alexander	NCIS Special Agent / Secret Service Special Agent	1–2		3, 8–9, 12	"Yankee White" (1.01)	"The Lost Boys" (12.23)	51	
Anthony "Tony" DiNozzo	Michael Weatherly	Senior Special Agent / Baltimore PD Detective / Director	1–13, 24–		21	"Yankee White" (1.01)		313	
Abigail "Abby" Sciuto	Pauley Perrette	Forensic Specialist	1–15			"Yankee White" (1.01)	"Two Steps Back" (15.22)	354	
Dr. Donald "Ducky" Mallard	David McCallum	Chief Medical Examiner / Profiler / Historian / RAMC Doctor	1–21			"Yankee White" (1.01)	"Black Sky" (20.22)	460	(Note: Ducky Mallard was Medical Examiner during seasons 1–16.) (Note: David McCallum is credited with the 'and' billing in seasons 1–18 and is credited with the 'with' (sharing with Rocky Carroll) billing in seasons 19–21. He remains in the opening credits for the first two episodes in Season 21 despite McCallum's death in September 2023, five months before Season 21 premiered and two months before that season began filming.)
Timothy "Tim" McGee	Sean Murray	Senior Special Agent	2–	1		"Sub Rosa" (1.07)		497	(Note: Timothy McGee was a Special Agent during Seasons 2–13.)
Ziva David	Cote de Pablo	NCIS Special Agent / Mossad Officer	3–11	17	3, 16	"Kill Ari (Part I)" (3.01)	"In the Wind" (17.11)	194	(Note: Ziva David was a Mossad Officer during Seasons 3–6.)
Jenny Shepard	Lauren Holly	NCIS Director / NCIS Special Agent	3–5	3	9, 12	"Kill Ari (Part I)" (3.01)	"The Lost Boys" (12.23)	65	
Leon Vance	Rocky Carroll	NCIS Director / NCIS Assistant Director / NCIS Special Agent	6–23	5		"Internal Affairs" (5.14)	"Sons and Daughters" (23.20)	399	(Note: Leon Vance was Assistant Director during season 5.) (Note: Rocky Carroll is credited with the 'with' billing.)
Dr. James "Jimmy" Palmer	Brian Dietzen	Chief Medical Examiner	10–	1–9		"Split Decision" (1.21)		412	(Note: Jimmy Palmer was Assistant Medical Examiner during seasons 1–14.)
Eleanor "Ellie" Bishop	Emily Wickersham	NCIS Special Agent / NSA Analyst	11–18	11	23	"Gut Check" (11.09)	"Her" (23.10)	174	
Nicholas "Nick" Torres	Wilmer Valderrama	NCIS Special Agent	14–			"Rogue" (14.01)		207	
Alexandra "Alex" Quinn	Jennifer Esposito	NCIS Special Agent / NCIS FLETC Trainer	14			"Rogue" (14.01)	"Rendezvous" (14.24)	24	
Clayton Reeves	Duane Henry	MI6 Officer / NCIS-MI6 Liaison	14–15		13	"Dead Letter" (13.23)	"Two Steps Back" (15.22)	47	
Dr. Jacqueline "Jack" Sloane	Maria Bello	Psychologist / NCIS Special Agent	15–18		15	"Skeleton Crew" (15.04)	"True Believer" (18.08)	73	
Kasie Hines	Diona Reasonover	Forensic Scientist	16–	15		"One Man's Trash" (15.17)		162	
Jessica Knight	Katrina Law	NCIS Special Agent / NCIS React Team Leader	19–		18	"Blown Away" (18.15)		101	
Alden Parker	Gary Cole	NCIS Supervisory Special Agent / FBI Special Agent	19–		19	"Nearly Departed" (19.02)		98	(Note: Gary Cole is credited with the 'and' billing)

=== Notable recurring and guest characters ===
Key
R	Recurring
G	Guest

Actor	Character	Season																							Seasons
Actor	Character	1	2	3	4	5	6	7	8	9	10	11	12	13	14	15	16	17	18	19	20	21	22	23	Seasons
Family
Nina Foch	Victoria Mallard	—	G	G	—	—	—	—	—	—	—	—	—	—	—	—	—	—	—	—	—	—	—	—	2–3
Caroline Lagerfelt	Victoria Mallard	—	—	—	—	—	—	—	—	—	—	—	—	—	G	—	—	—	—	—	—	—	—	—	14
Troian Bellisario	Sarah McGee	—	G	—	G	—	—	—	—	—	—	—	—	—	—	—	—	—	—	—	—	—	—	—	2, 4
Mary Mouser	Kelly Gibbs	—	—	G	G	—	—	G	—	—	—	—	—	—	—	—	—	—	—	—	—	—	—	—	3–4, 7
Brenna Radding	Kelly Gibbs	—	—	—	—	G	—	—	—	—	—	—	—	—	—	—	—	—	—	—	—	—	—	—	5
Sam Schuder	Kelly Gibbs	—	—	—	—	—	—	—	—	G	—	—	—	—	—	—	—	—	—	—	—	—	—	—	9
Mila Brener	Kelly Gibbs	—	—	—	—	—	—	—	—	—	—	—	—	G	—	—	—	—	—	—	—	—	—	—	13
Darby Stanchfield	Shannon Gibbs	—	—	G	—	G	G	G	—	G	—	—	—	—	—	—	—	—	—	—	—	—	—	—	3, 5–7, 9
Aviva Baumann	Shannon Gibbs	—	—	—	—	—	G	G	—	G	—	—	—	—	—	—	—	—	—	—	—	—	—	—	6–7, 9
Heather Scobie	Diane Sterling	—	—	—	G	—	—	—	—	—	—	—	—	—	—	—	—	—	—	—	—	—	—	—	4
Melinda McGraw	Diane Sterling	—	—	—	—	—	—	—	—	G	G	G	G	—	—	—	G	—	—	—	—	—	—	—	9–12, 16
Michael Nouri	Eli David	—	—	—	—	—	G	G	G	—	G	—	—	—	—	—	—	—	—	—	—	—	—	—	6–8, 10
Ben Morrison	Eli David	—	—	—	—	—	—	—	—	—	G	G	—	—	—	—	—	—	—	—	—	—	—	—	10–11
Ralph Waite	Jackson Gibbs	—	—	—	—	—	G	G	G	G	G	G	—	—	—	—	—	—	—	—	—	—	—	—	6–11
Clint Carmichael	Jackson Gibbs	—	—	—	—	—	G	—	—	—	—	—	—	—	—	—	—	—	—	—	—	—	—	—	6
Andrew Lander	Jackson Gibbs	—	—	—	—	—	—	—	—	—	—	G	—	—	—	—	—	—	—	—	—	—	—	—	11
Rob Norton	Jackson Gibbs	—	—	—	—	—	—	—	—	—	—	G	—	—	—	—	—	—	—	—	—	—	—	—	11
Paula Newsome	Jackie Vance	—	—	—	—	—	G	G	—	G	G	—	—	—	—	—	—	—	—	—	—	—	—	—	6–7, 9–10
Khamani Griffin	Jared Vance	—	—	—	—	—	G	—	—	—	—	—	—	—	—	—	—	—	—	—	—	—	—	—	6
Akinsola Aribo	Jared Vance	—	—	—	—	—	—	—	—	G	G	G	—	—	—	—	—	—	—	—	—	—	—	—	9–11
Spence Moore II	Jared Vance	—	—	—	—	—	—	—	—	—	—	—	—	—	—	—	—	—	—	—	—	G	—	—	21
China Anne McClain	Kayla Vance	—	—	—	—	—	G	—	—	—	—	—	—	—	—	—	—	—	—	—	—	—	—	—	6
Kiara Muhammad	Kayla Vance	—	—	—	—	—	—	—	—	G	G	G	G	—	—	—	—	—	—	—	—	—	—	—	9–12
Naomi Grace	Kayla Vance	—	—	—	—	—	—	—	—	—	—	—	—	—	—	G	G	—	—	G	—	—	—	—	15–16, 19
Robert Wagner	Anthony DiNozzo Sr.	—	—	—	—	—	—	G	G	G	G	G	G	G	G	G	G	—	—	—	—	—	—	—	7–16
Michelle Pierce	Breena Palmer	—	—	—	—	—	—	G	—	G	—	G	G	—	—	—	—	—	—	G	—	—	—	—	7, 9, 11–12, 19
Wendy Makkena	Rachel Cranston	—	—	—	—	—	—	—	G	G	—	G	—	—	—	—	—	—	—	—	—	—	—	—	8–9, 11
Daniel Louis Rivas	Kyle Davis	—	—	—	—	—	—	—	—	G	G	—	—	—	—	—	—	—	—	—	—	—	—	—	9–10
Jamie Bamber	Jake Malloy	—	—	—	—	—	—	—	—	—	—	—	R	G	—	—	—	—	—	—	—	—	—	—	12–13
Pilar Holland	Lucia Campbell	—	—	—	—	—	—	—	—	—	—	—	—	—	G	—	—	—	—	—	G	G	—	—	14, 20–21
Kate Hamilton	Faith Tolliver	—	—	—	—	—	—	—	—	—	—	—	—	—	—	—	G	G	—	—	—	—	—	—	16–17
Francis Xavier McCarthy	Roman Parker	—	—	—	—	—	—	—	—	—	—	—	—	—	—	—	—	—	—	G	G	—	G	—	19–20, 22
Lilan Bowden	Robin Knight	—	—	—	—	—	—	—	—	—	—	—	—	—	—	—	—	—	—	—	G	—	G	—	20, 22
Nancy Travis	Harriet Parker	—	—	—	—	—	—	—	—	—	—	—	—	—	—	—	—	—	—	—	—	—	—	G	23
Patrick Keleher	Mateo Garcia	—	—	—	—	—	—	—	—	—	—	—	—	—	—	—	—	—	—	—	—	—	—	G	23
NCIS and Navy employees
Alan Dale	Tom Morrow	R	G	G	—	—	—	—	—	—	R	G	G	G	—	—	—	—	—	—	—	—	—	—	1–3, 10–13
Pancho Demmings	Gerald Jackson	R	—	G	—	—	—	—	—	—	—	—	—	—	—	—	—	—	—	—	—	—	—	—	1, 3
Patrick Labyorteaux	Bud Roberts	G	—	—	—	—	—	—	—	—	—	—	—	—	G	G	—	—	—	—	—	—	—	—	1, 14–15
Joel Gretsch	Stan Burley	G	—	—	—	—	—	—	—	G	G	—	—	G	—	—	—	—	—	—	—	—	—	—	1, 9–10, 13
Jessica Steen	Paula Cassidy	R	G	G	G	—	—	—	—	—	—	—	G	—	—	—	—	—	—	—	—	—	—	—	1–4, 12
Tim Kelleher	Chris Pacci	G	—	—	—	—	—	—	G	G	—	—	G	—	—	—	—	—	—	—	—	—	—	—	1, 8–9, 12
Tamara Taylor	Cassie Yates	—	G	G	—	—	—	—	—	—	—	—	—	—	—	—	—	—	—	—	—	—	—	—	2–3
Michael Bellisario	Charles Sterling	—	—	R	—	—	—	—	—	—	—	—	—	—	—	—	—	—	—	—	—	—	—	—	3
Stephanie Mello	Cynthia Sumner	—	—	R	R	—	—	—	—	—	—	—	—	—	—	—	—	—	—	—	—	—	—	—	3–4
Muse Watson	Mike Franks	—	—	G	G	G	G	G	G	G	G	G	G	G	—	G	—	—	—	—	—	—	—	—	3–13, 15
Liza Lapira	Michelle Lee	—	—	—	R	—	R	—	—	—	—	—	—	—	—	—	—	—	—	—	—	—	—	—	4, 6
Susan Kelechi Watson	Nikki Jardine	—	—	—	—	R	—	—	—	—	—	—	—	—	—	—	—	—	—	—	—	—	—	—	5
Jonathan LaPaglia	Brent Langer	—	—	—	—	G	G	—	—	—	—	—	—	—	—	—	—	—	—	—	—	—	—	—	5–6
Todd Lowe	Chad Dunham	—	—	—	—	—	R	—	—	—	—	—	—	—	—	—	—	—	—	—	—	—	—	—	6
Jude Ciccolella	Phillip Davenport	—	—	—	—	—	G	—	G	—	—	—	—	—	—	—	—	—	—	—	—	—	—	—	6, 8
Chris O'Donnell	G. Callen	—	—	—	—	—	G	—	—	—	—	—	—	—	—	—	—	—	—	—	G	—	—	—	6, 20
LL Cool J	Sam Hanna	—	—	—	—	—	G	—	—	—	—	—	—	—	—	—	—	—	—	—	G	—	G	G	6, 20, 22–23
Daniela Ruah	Kensi Blye	—	—	—	—	—	G	—	—	—	—	—	—	—	—	—	—	—	—	—	—	G	—	—	6, 21
Jackie Geary	Susan Grady	—	—	—	—	—	—	G	—	—	—	G	—	—	—	—	—	—	—	—	—	—	—	—	7, 11
Michael O'Neill	Riley McCallister	—	—	—	—	—	—	—	G	G	—	—	—	—	—	—	—	—	—	—	—	—	—	—	8–9
Sarah Jane Morris	E.J. Barrett	—	—	—	—	—	—	—	R	G	—	—	—	—	—	—	—	—	—	—	—	—	—	—	8–9
Matt Willig	Simon Cade	—	—	—	—	—	—	—	R	G	—	—	—	—	—	—	—	—	—	—	—	—	—	—	8–9
Alimi Ballard	Gayne Levin	—	—	—	—	—	—	—	R	—	—	—	—	—	—	—	—	—	—	—	—	—	—	—	8
Matt Craven	Clayton Jarvis	—	—	—	—	—	—	—	G	R	R	G	—	—	—	—	—	—	—	—	—	—	—	—	8–11
J. Claude Deering	Curtis Hubley	—	—	—	—	—	—	—	—	G	—	—	—	—	G	—	—	—	—	G	—	R	G	G	9, 14, 19, 21–23
Matt Jones	Ned Dorneget	—	—	—	—	—	—	—	—	R	G	—	G	—	—	—	—	—	—	—	—	—	—	—	9–10, 12
Greg Germann	Jerome Craig	—	—	—	—	—	—	—	—	—	R	—	—	—	—	—	—	—	—	—	—	—	—	—	11
Leslie Hope	Sarah Porter	—	—	—	—	—	—	—	—	—	—	R	G	G	—	—	—	—	—	—	—	—	—	—	11–13
Roma Maffia	Vera Strickland	—	—	—	—	—	—	—	—	—	—	G	—	—	—	—	—	—	—	—	—	—	—	G	11, 23
Hugo Armstrong	Eugene Coyle	—	—	—	—	—	—	—	—	—	—	G	—	—	—	—	—	—	G	—	—	—	—	—	11, 18
Scott Bakula	Dwayne Pride	—	—	—	—	—	—	—	—	—	—	G	—	G	G	—	—	—	—	—	—	—	—	—	11, 13–14
Lucas Black	Chris LaSalle	—	—	—	—	—	—	—	—	—	—	G	—	G	G	—	—	—	—	—	—	—	—	—	11, 13–14
Zoe McLellan	Merri Brody	—	—	—	—	—	—	—	—	—	—	G	—	G	—	—	—	—	—	—	—	—	—	—	11, 13
Rafi Silver	Qasim Naasir	—	—	—	—	—	—	—	—	—	—	—	G	—	R	—	—	—	—	—	—	—	—	—	12, 14
Tony Gonzalez	Tony Francis	—	—	—	—	—	—	—	—	—	—	—	G	G	G	—	—	—	—	—	—	—	—	—	12–14
Don Lake	Phillip Brooks	—	—	—	—	—	—	—	—	—	—	—	—	—	—	G	G	G	—	—	—	—	—	—	15–17
Megan Gallagher	Jennifer Leo	—	—	—	—	—	—	—	—	—	—	—	—	—	—	—	G	G	—	G	—	—	—	—	16–17, 19
Zane Holtz	Dale Sawyer	—	—	—	—	—	—	—	—	—	—	—	—	—	—	—	—	—	G	G	G	—	G	G	18–20, 22–23
Vanessa Lachey	Jane Tennant	—	—	—	—	—	—	—	—	—	—	—	—	—	—	—	—	—	—	G	G	G	—	—	19–21
Jason Antoon	Ernie Malik	—	—	—	—	—	—	—	—	—	—	—	—	—	—	—	—	—	—	G	G	—	—	—	19–20
Other agencies
Joe Spano	Tobias Fornell	R	R	R	R	G	G	G	G	G	G	R	G	R	R	R	G	—	R	G	G	G	—	—	1–16, 18–21
Alicia Coppola	Faith Coleman	G	G	—	—	—	—	—	—	—	—	—	—	—	—	—	—	—	—	—	—	—	—	—	1–2
Don Franklin	Ron Sacks	—	—	G	G	—	—	—	—	—	—	—	—	—	—	—	—	—	—	—	—	—	—	—	3–4
Susanna Thompson	Hollis Mann	—	—	—	R	R	—	—	—	—	—	G	G	—	—	—	—	—	—	—	—	—	—	—	4–5, 11–12
David Dayan Fisher	Trent Kort	—	—	—	R	R	G	—	G	—	—	—	—	G	—	—	—	—	—	—	—	—	—	—	4–6, 8, 13
Merik Tadros	Michael Rivkin	—	—	—	—	—	R	—	—	—	—	—	—	—	—	—	—	—	—	—	—	—	—	—	6
Carlease Burke	D'arcy McKinna	—	—	—	—	—	G	G	—	—	—	—	G	—	—	—	—	—	—	—	—	—	—	—	6–7, 12
Arnold Vosloo	Amit Hadar	—	—	—	—	—	G	—	G	—	—	—	—	—	—	—	—	—	—	—	—	—	—	—	6, 8
Jack Conley	Danny Sportelli	—	—	—	—	—	—	G	—	G	—	—	—	—	—	G	—	—	—	—	—	—	—	—	7, 9, 15
Diane Neal	Abigail Borin	—	—	—	—	—	—	G	G	G	G	G	G	—	—	—	—	—	—	—	—	—	—	—	7–12
TJ Ramini	Malachi Ben-Gidon	—	—	—	—	—	—	G	G	—	—	—	—	—	—	—	—	—	—	—	—	—	—	—	7–8
Enrique Murciano	Ray Cruz	—	—	—	—	—	—	—	G	G	—	—	—	—	—	—	—	—	—	—	—	—	—	—	8–9
Jamie Lee Curtis	Samantha Ryan	—	—	—	—	—	—	—	—	R	—	—	—	—	—	—	—	—	—	—	—	—	—	—	9
Marina Sirtis	Orli Elbaz	—	—	—	—	—	—	—	—	—	G	G	—	G	—	—	—	—	—	—	—	—	—	—	10–11, 13
Damon Dayoub	Adam Eshel	—	—	—	—	—	—	—	—	—	G	G	—	—	—	—	—	G	—	—	—	—	—	—	10–11, 17
Margo Harshman	Delilah Fielding-McGee	—	—	—	—	—	—	—	—	—	—	R	G	G	G	G	G	—	G	G	G	G	G	—	11–16, 18–22
Marisol Nichols	Zoe Keats	—	—	—	—	—	—	—	—	—	—	—	R	—	—	—	—	—	—	—	—	—	—	—	12
Scott William Winters	Westley Clark	—	—	—	—	—	—	—	—	—	—	—	—	—	—	—	R	—	—	—	—	—	—	—	16
Erik Passoja	Wayne Sweeney	—	—	—	—	—	—	—	—	—	—	—	—	—	—	—	—	—	—	G	G	—	G	—	19–20, 22
Antagonists
Rudolf Martin	Ari Haswari	G	G	G	—	—	—	—	—	G	—	—	—	—	—	—	—	—	—	—	—	—	—	—	1–3, 9
Eddie Jemison	Terry Spooner	—	—	G	—	—	—	—	—	—	—	—	—	—	—	G	—	—	—	—	—	—	—	—	3, 15
Enzo Cilenti	Mamoun Sharif	—	—	—	G	—	—	—	—	—	—	—	—	—	—	—	—	—	—	—	—	—	—	—	4
Armand Assante	René Benoit	—	—	—	R	G	—	—	—	—	—	—	—	—	—	—	—	—	—	—	—	—	—	—	4–5
Omid Abtahi	Saleem Ulman	—	—	—	—	—	G	G	—	—	—	—	—	—	—	—	—	—	—	—	—	—	—	—	6–7
Peter Jason	Robert King	—	—	—	—	—	G	—	—	—	—	—	—	—	—	G	—	—	—	—	—	—	—	—	6, 15
Marco Sanchez	Alejandro Rivera	—	—	—	—	—	—	R	G	—	—	G	—	—	—	G	—	—	—	—	—	—	—	—	7–8, 11, 15
Jacqueline Obradors	Paloma Reynosa	—	—	—	—	—	—	R	G	—	—	—	—	—	—	—	—	—	—	—	—	—	—	—	7–8
Tamer Hassan	Agah Bayar	—	—	—	—	—	—	—	G	G	—	—	G	—	—	—	—	—	—	—	—	—	—	—	8–9, 12
Kerr Smith	Jonas Cobb	—	—	—	—	—	—	—	G	—	—	—	—	—	—	—	—	—	—	—	—	—	—	—	8
Scott Wolf	Jonathan Cole	—	—	—	—	—	—	—	—	R	—	—	—	—	—	—	—	—	—	—	—	—	—	—	9
Philip Casnoff	Sean Latham	—	—	—	—	—	—	—	—	G	—	—	—	—	—	—	—	—	—	—	—	—	—	—	9
Richard Schiff	Harper Dearing	—	—	—	—	—	—	—	—	G	G	—	—	—	—	—	—	—	—	—	—	—	—	—	9–10
Oded Fehr	Ilan Bodnar	—	—	—	—	—	—	—	—	—	R	—	—	—	—	—	—	—	—	—	—	—	—	—	10
Alex Veadov	Sergei Mishnev	—	—	—	—	—	—	—	—	—	—	—	R	—	—	—	—	—	—	—	—	—	—	—	12
French Stewart	Paul Triff	—	—	—	—	—	—	—	—	—	—	—	—	—	G	G	—	—	—	—	—	—	—	—	14–15
Graham Hamilton	Gabriel Hicks	—	—	—	—	—	—	—	—	—	—	—	—	—	—	R	—	—	—	—	—	—	—	—	15
Dionne Gipson	Mallory Madden	—	—	—	—	—	—	—	—	—	—	—	—	—	—	—	R	—	—	—	—	—	—	—	16
Louise Barnes	Mira Sahar Azam	—	—	—	—	—	—	—	—	—	—	—	—	—	—	—	—	R	—	—	—	—	—	—	17
Other characters
Austin Marques	Billy Fuentes	G	—	—	—	—	—	—	—	—	—	—	—	—	—	—	—	—	—	—	—	—	—	G	1, 23
Kent Shocknek	Guy Ross	G	—	G	—	—	G	G	—	—	—	—	G	G	—	G	G	—	—	—	—	G	—	—	1, 3, 6–7, 12–13, 15–16, 21
Scottie Thompson	Jeanne Benoit	—	—	—	R	G	—	—	—	—	—	—	—	G	—	—	—	—	—	—	—	—	—	—	4–5, 13
Payton Spencer	Emily Fornell	—	—	—	G	—	—	—	—	—	—	—	—	—	—	—	—	—	—	—	—	—	—	—	4
Juliette Angelo	Emily Fornell	—	—	—	—	—	—	—	—	—	—	G	G	G	G	—	G	—	G	—	—	—	—	—	11–14, 16, 18
Paul Telfer	Damon Werth	—	—	—	—	G	—	G	—	—	—	—	—	—	—	—	—	—	—	—	—	—	—	—	5, 7
Sean Harmon	Young Gibbs	—	—	—	—	—	G	G	—	G	—	—	—	—	—	—	—	—	G	—	—	—	—	—	6–7, 9, 18
Micah Owens	Young Gibbs	—	—	—	—	—	—	—	—	—	—	G	—	—	—	—	—	—	—	—	—	—	—	—	11
Tehmina Sunny	Leyla Shakarji	—	—	—	—	—	—	G	G	—	—	G	—	—	—	—	—	—	—	—	—	—	—	—	7–8, 11
Meredith Eaton	Carol Wilson	—	G	—	—	—	—	G	—	G	—	G	—	—	—	—	—	—	—	G	—	—	G	—	2, 7, 9, 11, 19, 22
Rena Sofer	Margaret Allison Hart	—	—	—	—	—	—	R	—	—	—	—	—	—	—	—	—	—	—	—	—	—	—	—	7
Connie Jackson	Elaine	—	—	—	—	—	—	—	—	G	—	G	—	G	G	—	G	G	G	—	G	—	—	—	9, 11, 13–14, 16–18, 20
Gabi Coccio	Young Ziva	—	—	—	—	—	—	—	—	—	G	G	—	—	—	—	—	—	—	—	—	—	—	—	10–11
Adam Campbell	Young Ducky	—	—	—	—	—	—	—	—	—	—	—	G	G	G	—	—	—	G	—	—	—	—	G	12–14, 18, 23
Jon Cryer	Dr. Cyril Taft	—	—	—	—	—	—	—	—	—	—	—	—	R	—	—	—	—	—	—	—	—	—	—	13
Laura San Giacomo	Dr. Grace Confalone	—	—	—	—	—	—	—	—	—	—	—	—	R	G	G	G	G	G	G	G	—	G	—	13–20, 22
Elayn J. Taylor	Odette Malone	—	—	—	—	—	—	—	—	—	—	—	—	—	—	—	G	G	G	—	—	—	—	—	16–18
Jack Fisher	Phineas	—	—	—	—	—	—	—	—	—	—	—	—	—	—	—	—	R	G	—	—	—	—	—	17–18
Pam Dawber	Marcie Warren	—	—	—	—	—	—	—	—	—	—	—	—	—	—	—	—	—	R	R	—	—	—	—	18–19

== Main characters ==
=== Leroy Jethro Gibbs ===
Leroy Jethro Gibbs
- NCIS character
- First appearance: "Ice Queen" (JAG); "Yankee White" (NCIS); "Breaking Brig" (NCIS: New Orleans); "Enter Sandman" (NCIS: Origins)
- Last appearance: "Meltdown" (JAG): "Great Wide Open" (NCIS); "See You Soon" (NCIS: New Orleans)
- Portrayed by: Mark Harmon; Sean Harmon (young); Micah Tayloe Owens (child)
- Voiced by: Josh Robert Thompson (NCIS: The Video Game)

In-universe information
- Gender: Male
- Occupation: Gunnery Sergeant (Marine sniper and military police; USMC; separated); NCIS Special Agent (retired)
- Affiliation: NCIS
- Family: Jackson Gibbs (father, deceased); Ann Gibbs (mother, deceased)
- Spouses: Shannon Fielding Gibbs (deceased); Diane Sterling (divorced, deceased); Rebecca Chase (divorced); Stephanie Flynn (divorced); Ellen Wallace (ex-fiancée, deceased)
- Children: Kelly Gibbs (deceased)
- Nationality: American

Career at NCIS
- Position: Special Agent in Charge: Major Case Response Team, Washington, D.C., office; Undercover operative, Europe
- Rank: Special Agent in Charge
- Years of Service: c. 1992–2021
- Awards: Silver Star, Purple Heart, Navy Meritorious Civilian Service Award

Supervisory Special Agent Leroy Jethro Gibbs (Mark Harmon) was born in Stillwater, Pennsylvania, to Jackson and Ann Gibbs. He enlisted in the Marine Corps in 1976 and became a Scout Sniper. After serving in Panama and Iraq, he retired from the Marine Corps with the rank of Gunnery Sergeant. He joined NIS, which later became NCIS, after his wife Shannon and only daughter Kelly were murdered in 1991. He later travelled to Mexico and murdered the drug dealer responsible, a crime he kept concealed for twenty years. Since then, he has been married and divorced three times, and is single, although he has had a number of romantic relationships since his last divorce.

Gibbs leads a Major Case Response Team (MCRT) consisting of field agents Timothy McGee, Ellie Bishop, and Nick Torres, supported by medical examiner Dr. Jimmy Palmer, psychologist and NCIS Agent Jack Sloane, forensic scientist Kasie Hines, and sometimes with the assistance of his good friend and former medical examiner Ducky Mallard. In the episode "Bête Noire", Gibbs comes face to face with terrorist Ari Haswari and tries to kill him but fails. Finding Ari later becomes an obsession for Gibbs after Ari shoots and kills original team member Kate Todd in front of Gibbs and DiNozzo in the season two finale, "Twilight". Gibbs often shows frustration with his team (particularly DiNozzo for rambling or McGee for getting sucked into technical rambling) by slapping them over the back of the head, an action that is later shared between team members and known as a "headslap" or "Gibbs-slap". He mostly suspended doing this however in season 14 and onward since DiNozzo left the agency, neither with McGee as the new senior field agent and DiNozzo successor nor with new agent Nick Torres, who often displays a variation of DiNozzo's behavior that "earned" him his headslaps previously.

Gibbs is often shown in his basement building boats, one of which he names after his daughter and another after one of his ex-wives. In the episode "Blowback", when confronting "Goliath" on the plane about "ARES", Gibbs reveals he is a Virgo. He is an expert sniper, as evidenced in "Hiatus" with flashbacks of him hitting a head shot at 1,200 yards of his family's murderer, who was driving a moving vehicle, and in "Jeopardy" when he hits a kidnapper with a very swift shot to the forehead taken with his left hand while kneeling inside a car trunk. In "Truth or Consequences", Gibbs saves his entire team by shooting the leader of a terrorist cell after DiNozzo and McGee get captured looking for Ziva.

Gibbs has developed a fatherly relationship with most of his team members, especially Abby Sciuto. When she left in "Two Steps Back", she didn't say goodbye to him in person because of this and instead expressed her reasons for leaving in a letter. He also showed fatherly affection towards Ziva, Tony, McGee, Bishop, and Torres on several occasions. Examples of this include: defending DiNozzo against his father and calling his then senior agent "the best young agent he ever worked with" in "Flesh and Blood"; calling Ziva "kid" in "Safe Harbor"; giving McGee the watch his father had given him on the day of his wedding with Shannon in "Something Blue" when McGee married Delilah; following Bishop to Oklahoma in "Blood Brothers" to help her deal with the end of her marriage; and having dinner with Torres to help him cope with his father abandoning him again in "Sangre".

One of Gibbs' longest lasting relationships on screen is his friendship with Tobias Fornell. The two had known each other since before the show started and had gotten to know each other when Fornell was about to marry Gibbs' second ex-wife Diane. Gibbs warned Fornell that Diane would leave him and plunder his accounts—which happened eventually. Over the course of the show, Fornell and Gibbs often butted heads but their friendship became so strong over time that even after Gibbs ended Fornell's career as an FBI agent in "Burden of Proof" through court testimony the two were able to forgive each other and rekindle it. In "Daughters" Fornell forces Gibbs to take the case of Fornell and Diane's daughter Emily who had overdosed on drugs despite not falling in the jurisdiction of NCIS.

At the end of "Daughters", Gibbs is visited by Ziva who he believed had died when her farm house was hit by a missile in "Dead Letter". While he and Ziva are on the run from a terrorist group that tries to kill Gibbs in order to force Ziva to join them, Ziva confronts Gibbs about him not looking for her after her apparent death. He later admits to her in "Into the Light" that he was afraid to go looking for her and find out that she was indeed dead (a sentiment he repeats to Sloane an episode later).

The relationship between Gibbs and Sloane is different from those he has with the rest of his team. The two are friends but the other team members, most openly Torres, have noted that the two have "a thing". In "What Child Is This?" the two are shown to be pretty close to the point that they apparently cuddle in public. This, however, led nowhere, which Sloane herself laments in "Going Mobile". That episodes ends with Gibbs replacing her rorschach test painting with that of an elephant in reference to her calling their non-existing "thing" "the elephant in the room" earlier in the episode.

He held position as MCRT team leader up until March 2021 when he was suspended for assaulting a dog murderer which leaves his second-in-command, NCIS Special Agent Timothy McGee to succeed him as the agent in charge of the MCRT.

In June 2021, Gibbs resigned from the team and NCIS for good, opting to remain in Alaska instead of returning to Washington, D.C..

Until season 19's "Face the Strange", Harmon was the only main actor to appear in every episode of the series.

=== Caitlin Todd ===
Caitlin "Kate" Todd
- NCIS character
- First appearance: "Yankee White" (1.01); September 23, 2003
- Last appearance: "Twilight" (2.23); May 24, 2005 (as series regular) "Kill Ari (Part II)" (3.02); September 27, 2005 (as guest star)
- Portrayed by: Sasha Alexander

In-universe information
- Gender: Female
- Occupation: NCIS Special Agent; USSS Special Agent
- Family: Rachel Cranston (sister) 3 brothers
- Nationality: American

Special Agent Caitlin "Kate" Todd (Sasha Alexander) first appears in the episode "Yankee White". Todd is a former Secret Service agent, recruited by Gibbs after she successfully helped him solve a murder aboard Air Force One. She works well with everyone on the team, becoming particularly close with Ducky and Abby, who convinces her to get a tattoo. However, Todd's relationship with DiNozzo is more adversarial and they are more like siblings than anything else. Tony frequently flirts with her and sometimes goes through her personal belongings, no matter how many times she points out that his behavior is grossly unprofessional. At the same time, Kate is willing to risk her life for DiNozzo and admits that life would be considerably less interesting without him around.

Following Sasha Alexander's decision to leave the show, Todd is killed in the line of duty (at the end of the episode "Twilight") by Ari Haswari, collateral damage in the terrorist's obsession with Gibbs. She dies after being shot in the head by Ari with a lone bullet that is fired from a model of sniper rifle (Bravo 51) nicknamed "Kate". She was replaced at NCIS by Ziva David.

=== Anthony DiNozzo ===
Anthony DiNozzo Jr.
- NCIS character
- First appearance: "Ice Queen" (JAG)
- Portrayed by: Michael Weatherly; Tanner Stine (young DiNozzo)
- Voiced by: Adam Epstein (NCIS: The Video Game)

In-universe information
- Alias: Tony DiNardo (during an undercover mission with Jenny Shepard)
- Gender: Male
- Occupation: NCIS Special Agent (former); Police Detective (former)
- Family: Anthony D. DiNozzo Sr. (father); Unknown Paddington (mother; deceased)
- Significant other: Ziva David
- Children: Tali (daughter; with Ziva David)
- Relatives: Clive Paddington (uncle; deceased); Crispian Paddington (cousin); Vincenzo DiNozzo (uncle)
- Nationality: American

Career at NCIS
- Position: Special Agent
- Rank: Senior field agent
- Years of service: c. 2001/2002-2016
- Born: July 8, 1972

Anthony D. "Tony" DiNozzo Jr. (Michael Weatherly) is a former NCIS Senior Field Special Agent and former homicide detective for the Baltimore, Philadelphia and Peoria Police Departments. Like Gibbs, he has limited patience for the scientific method and technical terms. DiNozzo is known for his seemingly-endless film references; Ziva insists that his dying words will be "I've seen this film".

He attended Ohio State University as a physical education major and was a member of the "Alpha Chi Delta" fraternity, class of 1989. DiNozzo is said to have played varsity college basketball, "running the point for Ohio State" according to Abby. It is mentioned in the season three episode "Kill Ari (Part I)" that he comes from a wealthy family but has been cut off by his father, Anthony DiNozzo Sr (played by Robert Wagner who in turn was played by Weatherly in a TV movie). DiNozzo's mother was over-protective and she "dressed him like a sailor until he was ten". ("Frame Up")

DiNozzo is a flirt, and has a fondness for playing pranks on his co-workers, sometimes with little respect for their boundaries. During the course of season four, he goes on an undercover assignment (per orders of the Director of NCIS, Jenny Shepard), the key mission being to find arms dealer La Grenouille (Rene Benoit) by posing as his daughter's (Jeanne Benoit's) boyfriend Anthony DiNardo a college professor. In the episode "Knockout", he reveals that he is not doing well with women and that he is still hurting from his relationship with former girlfriend Jeanne Benoit.

There is a great deal of romantic tension between Tony and Ziva. Despite his playboy manner and lighthearted nature, DiNozzo is frequently shown to be very sharp; he is able to coax Mossad Director Eli David into admitting that he ordered Rivkin and Ziva to spy on NCIS. He is reassigned as an Agent Afloat in the season five finale "Judgment Day", and transferred back to the Major Case Response Team in the episode "Agent Afloat". In the season nine finale, "Till Death Do Us Part", a bomb blast at NCIS headquarters occurs with Tony and Ziva in the elevator. Both are rescued from the elevator and survive their ordeal.

In season thirteen, DiNozzo confesses his love for Ziva after learning of her apparent death, and it is revealed that the two have a child named Tali. He departs NCIS in order to travel to Israel to find answers and to Paris because Ziva loved Paris. In season 14 it is revealed that Tali and Tony like Paris so much they'll stay indefinitely. It is revealed in season 16 that Ziva is in fact alive and has been in hiding to protect Tony and Tali from a woman who is trying to kill her, and in season 17 it is elaborated that Tony found Ziva after leaving NCIS and knew she was alive all along. Once the threat against her is eliminated, Ziva goes home to Paris to reunite with Tony and Tali.

Prior to his departure in the season thirteen episode "Family First", Michael Weatherly appeared in every episode except season thirteen's "Homefront".

=== Abby Sciuto ===
Abigail "Abby" Sciuto
- NCIS character
- First appearance: "Ice Queen" (JAG)
- Last appearance: "Two Steps Back" (NCIS)
- Portrayed by: Pauley Perrette; Brighton Sharbino (age 10)
- Voiced by: Betsy Moore (NCIS: The Video Game)
- Other Appearances: NCIS: Los Angeles; NCIS: New Orleans

In-universe information
- Nickname: Abs
- Gender: Female
- Occupation: Forensic Scientist, NCIS (former)
- Religion: Catholic
- Nationality: American

Abigail "Abby" Sciuto is a former forensic specialist with NCIS, and is originally from Jefferson Parish, Louisiana. As indicated in the episode "Seadog", she is the adopted child of deaf parents, though she does not find out she is adopted until season nine when she learns that she has a biological brother (with whom she reconnects in season ten). She was known for her gothic style of dress (although she herself does not consider herself to be "Goth") and her addiction to the fictional high-caffeine beverage "Caf-Pow!", which according to former NCIS director Jenny Shepard earned her the nickname "Energizer Abby".

Abby had a brief sexual relationship with Special Agent McGee, seen in the season one episode "Reveille", which ended with the two remaining friends. She was the most active and affectionate person of the team, often hugging everyone and talking fast, though she could be easily distracted. She was one of the few who could talk to Gibbs freely, and he often brought her Caf-Pows when he visited her lab for information. She and Gibbs are both fluent in sign language. She has a stuffed hippopotamus named Bert that often appeared in the show and provided comic relief with its farting in otherwise tense situations.

Abby is a devout Roman Catholic and her hobbies include being on a bowling team with nuns, helping build homes for the needy, and playing computer games. She sleeps in a coffin and is, according to DiNozzo, "the happiest goth you will ever meet". In the season nine finale "Till Death Do Us Part", a bomb blast at NCIS headquarters occurred with Gibbs tackling Abby to the floor in her lab. In the episode "Extreme Prejudice", it was revealed that she survived, physically unharmed.

In 2017, Perrette revealed that she would leave the show after the end of season 15.

Late in season 15, MI6 Agent Clayton Reeves was killed while protecting Abby from a supposed mugger. She was wounded in the attempt, but recovered and later coerced the man who wanted her dead to confess. She then resigned from NCIS in order to start a charity in England in memory of Reeves' mother, a dream he had planned to pursue after retiring.

Prior to her departure in the season fifteen episode "Two Steps Back", Pauley Perrette appeared in every episode.

=== Dr. Donald "Ducky" Mallard ===
Donald Mallard
- NCIS character
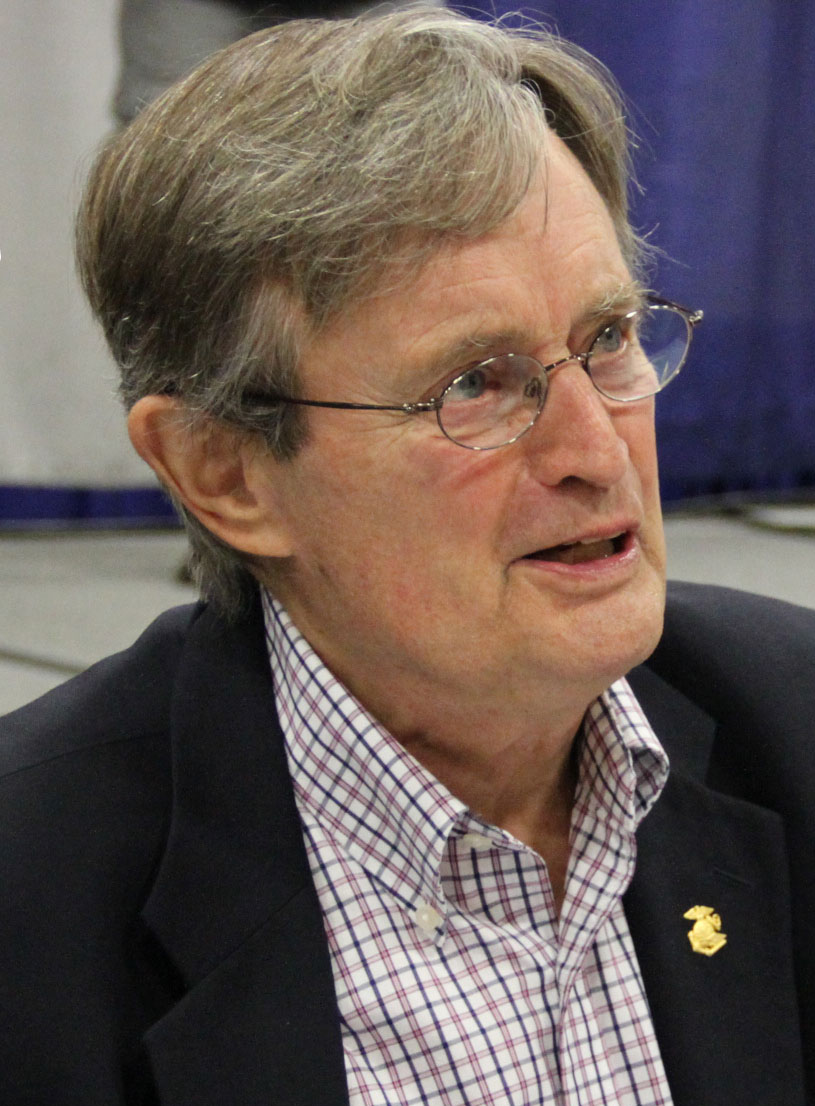
- First appearance: "Ice Queen" (JAG); "Yankee White" (NCIS); "The Edge" (NCIS: Origins)
- Last appearance: "All Good Things" (NCIS)
- Created by: Donald P. Bellisario, Don McGill
- Portrayed by: David McCallum (2003–2023; his death); Adam Campbell (young)

In-universe information
- Full name: Donald Horatio Mallard, M.D. (S14 E10, "The Tie That Binds")
- Nickname: Ducky
- Titles: Chief Medical Examiner (1992–2019); NCIS Historian (2019–2023; his death)
- Occupation: Medical Examiner
- Affiliation: Naval Criminal Investigative Service
- Family: Joseph Mallard (father, deceased); Victoria Mallard (mother, deceased); Lorraine Mallard (ex-stepmother, deceased); Nicholas Mallard (half-brother)
- Nationality: Scottish

Dr. Donald Horatio "Ducky" Mallard, DHL (hon.) (David McCallum) was the chief medical examiner at NCIS and an old friend of Gibbs. He retired from his position as chief medical examiner and became an NCIS historian in season 16. The NCIS team addresses him by his nickname "Ducky," a play on his last name Mallard; when he was younger he went by "Donnie." Mallard is Scottish-born; his cellphone's ringtone features bagpipes playing "Scotland the Brave".

Mallard is a kind and eccentric character who often talks to the deceased ("their bodies tell me a great deal; it helps to reciprocate") and rambles to the living with long personal remembrances or historical accounts. In "Truth or Consequences," DiNozzo says that "sometimes his head is connected directly to his mouth." He calls coworkers by their full first names or by their surnames with an honorific ("Abigail" for Abby Sciuto, "Mr. Palmer" for his assistant Jimmy Palmer, etc.) and Jenny Shepard and Leon Vance by their job title, "Director". He has revealed that he is not a religious person.

Mallard attended Eton College and the University of Edinburgh Medical School and served in the Royal Army Medical Corps, mustering out with the rank of Captain. While in the RAMC, he served in the Vietnam War while on an officer-exchange program with the United States military. He served in Bosnia during the Yugoslav Wars and in Afghanistan during the Soviet invasion.

While in Afghanistan, Ducky stumbled on a CIA interrogation program in the Jalozai refugee camp on the Pakistani border, run by Marcin Jerek, aka Mr. Pain, which tortured Afghan refugees for intelligence purposes. When Ducky found out about the program through Javid, a young man being tortured by Mr. Pain, he gave Javid and a number of other prisoners a lethal injection of morphine to save them from a slow and painful death. When Javid's sister attacked Ducky at a crime scene, the story resurfaced and Ducky was to be investigated by the Afghan government for war crimes. However, he was found innocent when he confronted Mr. Pain at the Afghan embassy. It was revealed that Mr. Pain knew that Javid was innocent and that the only reason he was torturing him was to break Ducky to stop him giving prisoners morphine injections. Pain was then arrested and turned over to the Afghan government for trial. However, Ducky claimed that he would not be forgiven for the act by others or by himself.

He joined NCIS in December 1992. Ducky and Gibbs have worked together for many years and Ducky is Gibbs' closest friend. Although most of his time is spent in autopsy and attending crime scenes, he is sent on an important undercover mission in "Blowback". Ducky has a "second talent", as Gibbs calls it, to be able to read people, which he expands in season four by studying psychology. In cases without actual bodies, he assists by using his psychological training to decipher the clues left by the perpetrators and establish modus operandi and motive.

Until season six, Ducky lived with his aging mother Victoria and her corgis. Nina Foch, who played Victoria, died in 2008. In "Broken Bird," Ducky reveals that his mother has moved out and has Alzheimer's disease. In "Double Identity," it is revealed that Ducky's mother has died. The rest of the team only learns of Victoria's death when Abby follows Ducky to her grave. Later, Gibbs pays him a condolence call in the autopsy room, but Ducky seems relieved at her death (probably as she was no longer suffering from Alzheimer's), grateful to have been her son and proud that she almost lived to the age of 100. In season nine, "Playing with Fire," it is revealed that Ducky has inherited a lot of money from his mother's estate. Gibbs is the first person he reveals this to. In the episode "Spinning Wheel," Ducky is revealed to have a half-brother, Nicholas, who is 20 years his junior; his father Joseph and his ex-stepmother, Lorraine, are also introduced in that episode.

Ducky owns a Morgan that he restored himself. There is a running gag in which Ducky and his assistant (first Gerald and then Jimmy) frequently get lost or meet a mishap when driving to the crime scene. In the Halloween episode "Witch Hunt," he and Jimmy are late after their van is pelted with eggs by youths in ninja costumes. According to Jimmy, Ducky chased the teens for several blocks and apprehended them and made them clean its windshield. He asks Gibbs to be the executor of his will.

In the season 8 episode "False Witness", Ducky decides to open a Facebook account to keep up with the times, and the interests he tries to list in his profile include etymology, archeology, sociology, fluviomorphology, hymenopterology, and ornithology. In the season 9 episode "Thirst", he dates a woman he met online, but it ends badly.

While walking on a beach, Ducky suffers a heart attack in the season nine finale, "Till Death Do Us Part," after hearing about the bomb blast at NCIS headquarters and then is seen lying motionless. In the season ten premiere "Extreme Prejudice," it is shown that he has survived the condition and is receiving treatment after being found on the beach. Under reduced workload, he returns to work alongside the team. From this he is seen to push Jimmy into being more confident and to be ready to take his place.

In "Twofer," Ducky learns that his alma mater, the University of Edinburgh, wants to present him with an honorary doctor of Humane Letters, which he receives in "Exit Strategy."

In season 15, Ducky takes a sabbatical from NCIS to teach at John Jay College of Criminal Justice, leaving Dr. Palmer in charge in his absence. His visiting professorship ends in early season 16 and he proceeds to embark on a book tour after publishing a book about the various cases he had worked on over his long career as a medical examiner (both at and prior to NCIS). Ducky announces his official retirement from the Naval Criminal Investigative Service in "Bears and Cubs." In "Silent Service," he accepts an offer from Gibbs and Vance of a part-time position as NCIS historian, since it will allow him to come and go as he pleases and still assist the team's investigations.

When Special Agent Caitlin Todd asked Gibbs "What did Ducky look like when he was younger?" he replied, "Illya Kuryakin"—the Russian U.N.C.L.E. agent played by McCallum in the 1960s television show The Man from U.N.C.L.E. In the episode "Hung Out to Dry," it is revealed that he has a nephew, though no further information follows.

Until season 15, David McCallum had appeared in every episode of NCIS except "Legend Part II".

David McCallum died on September 25, 2023, six days after his 90th birthday. McCallum's death eventually led to Ducky dying in his sleep in the second episode of Season 21, dedicated to McCallum/Ducky "The Stories We Leave Behind". Despite this, McCallum remains in the opening credits in the first two Season 21 episodes.

In the season 23 episode "All Good Things," in a posthumous appearance, a young version of Ducky is seen guiding Vance into the afterlife after Vance was mortally wounded.

=== Timothy McGee ===
Timothy "Tim" McGee (Sean Murray) first appears in the episode "Sub Rosa" as a case agent stationed at Norfolk, and is promoted to field agent and assigned to Agent Gibbs' team at the end of the season two premiere, "See No Evil", becoming a regular character. He serves as a field computer consultant and occasionally assists Abby in the lab. McGee clashes with DiNozzo, though after the two became partners (following Ziva's short departure from the team at the end of season six), they are frequently shown to form an effective team; however, their relationship has occasionally reverted to its original state upon Ziva's return.

McGee's methods are often indecipherable to the other team members, which earns him the pejorative nicknames "McGeek", "McGoo", and "Probie" from DiNozzo (along with other derisive nicknames, usually based on his surname); and "Elf Lord", used by multiple characters due to his elf character in an online role playing computer game. He studied biomedical engineering at Johns Hopkins University, and computer forensics at MIT. He graduated top of his class at the Federal Law Enforcement Training Center.

McGee is also a writer, writing mystery crime novels including a national bestseller, Deep Six: The Continuing Adventures of L.J. Tibbs, under the pseudonym Thom E. Gemcity (an anagram of his name), featuring characters based on his co-workers and others from his everyday life. He drives a silver Porsche Boxster as seen in the episode "Twisted Sister". He owns a dog, Jethro. Jethro was falsely accused of killing his police handler. Abby proves his innocence, names him and convinces McGee to take him because her landlord won't let her keep the dog, despite the dog having attacked him earlier in the episode ("Dog Tags"). McGee is transferred to Cybercrimes Division in season five ("Judgment Day") and back to the Major Case Response Team in season six ("Last Man Standing").

With DiNozzo's departure in the final episode of season thirteen, McGee is permanently promoted to Senior Field Agent. Following Ducky's death in season 21, McGee is now the longest running character still appearing on the show.

=== Ziva David ===
Ziva David (Cote de Pablo) initially holds the post of Mossad Liaison Officer to NCIS, to which she is appointed following the murder of Special Agent Caitlin Todd by a rogue Mossad operative named Ari Haswari. Ziva was Ari's control officer and half-sister. Despite initially believing that Ari is innocent, she fatally shoots him when he attempts to kill Gibbs, earning the latter's trust. Later, she requests a liaison assignment to NCIS and joins Gibbs' team. At the end of season six, she falls under suspicion as a spy for Mossad.

De Pablo describes the character as someone who is "completely different from anyone else on the show" because "she's been around men all her life; she's used to men in authority. She's not afraid of men". The series creator Don Bellisario stated, "When the Kate [Todd] character was killed, I didn't want to bring in the same character I had in Kate, someone who was very Puritan, uptight and treated Tony like a big brother. I wanted to bring in a character that causes Tony to have to sit back and not quite be able to handle her. And I wanted someone who was more international".

David's specialties with Mossad were espionage, assassination and counter-terrorism and she is highly trained in martial arts. She speaks Hebrew, English, Arabic, Spanish, French, Italian, German, Russian and Turkish. Despite being fluent in English, she sometimes misinterprets idioms and phrases; this is a running joke within the series. Throughout the series, she is accused of driving too fast with passengers (though she claims that she was trained to drive quickly to avoid roadside ambushes), leading to McGee and DiNozzo always wanting to drive whenever they are partnered with her.

She is shown to frequently clash with DiNozzo in good-natured arguments. She is very skilled with a knife and is shown teaching her colleagues how to throw one properly. She is the one person Gibbs trusts with any type of firearm in difficult situations. Throughout her career, she has travelled extensively to countries including Egypt (where she met Jenny Shepard), Iraq, the United Kingdom and Morocco.

Following Ziva's captivity and torture in a terrorist camp in Somalia, an ordeal that lasts for several months, she resigns from Mossad. In the season seven episode "Good Cop, Bad Cop" she becomes a probationary NCIS Special Agent. Since then, Tony refers to her (as with McGee) as "Probie". As of "Rule Fifty-One", she is a citizen of the United States and able to become a full agent which is made official in season nine's "Nature of the Beast".

David rarely speaks of her personal life. As of season ten, all of her immediate family are deceased. Her father, Eli David, is the director of Mossad until he is shot and killed in "Shabbat Shalom". The show rarely mentions her mother, Rivka, who taught her to drive; all that is known is that her mother is deceased and that she does not have the same mother as Ari. Her younger sister, Tali David, was killed in a Hamas terrorist attack against Israel at the age of sixteen. She also has an Aunt Nettie who likes to play mahjong. She also mentioned an unnamed uncle who breeds Arabian horses, and this might be the same brother that Eli David mentions who wanted to buy her a pony when she was younger.

Ziva is able to play the piano and is shown to enjoy cooking and reading. She enjoys the fictional drink Berry Mango Madness. She drives a red Mini Cooper but at the end of season ten, she sells the Mini and replaces it with an Inferno Orange Metallic V6 Camaro convertible. She likes listening to the Israeli band Hadag Nachash and the Latin American band Kinky. She does not own a television but her favorite film is The Sound of Music. Following Ziva's resignation from NCIS, she is replaced by former NSA analyst Ellie Bishop.

In season thirteen, following Ziva's presumed death at the hands of a Trent Kort-hired assassin, it is revealed she and Tony have a child named Tali.

In season sixteen, in the episode titled "She", it is revealed that Ziva is still alive and in hiding to protect her family. She writes a note to Eleanor Bishop, asking her to keep her secret. She makes her official return in the season finale, "Daughters", to warn Gibbs that he is in danger.

In season seventeen, in the episode titled "Out of the Darkness", it is revealed that Ziva faked her death to protect her family from a woman named Sahar who wanted to kill her. Sahar was involved in a Hamas splinter group with Ziva's brother Ari, and is seeking revenge for his death. Ziva and Gibbs are forced on the run to locate Sahar, the mastermind responsible. Meanwhile, the team investigates, with the revelation of Ziva's survival leaving major rifts amongst them. In the second episode "Into the Light", Ziva prepares to leave after taking down Sahar, telling Gibbs she has one more thing to do before she puts it all behind her. Tony calls Gibbs and Ziva assures Gibbs that Tony will be hearing from her before she leaves. In the tenth episode "The North Pole", the real Sahar (who had been posing as Gibbs' new neighbor "Sarah") tortures and kills Ziva's childhood friend Adam Eshel, and traps Ziva under a heavy plumbing pipe, planning to kill first her and then Tali, but is instead shot dead by Gibbs, leaving her son Phineas motherless. It is revealed that Tony knew that Ziva was alive and had tracked her down years ago, and that they both agreed to lay low until Sahar was dealt with for the sake of Tali. In the eleventh episode "In the Wind", Ziva tries to help Gibbs find Phineas, after he runs away from Gibbs' house following Gibbs' revelation about his mother's death. During the course of their search, Ziva questions whether she can go back to her life with Tony and Tali. She states that she had texted Tony to let him know that it is safe, but was met with no response. Tony then responds with a video of Tali asking Ziva to come home, which Gibbs states is proof she's ready to go home. With Phineas found and taken in by his aunt and uncle, Gibbs and the team say goodbye to Ziva before she leaves for Paris, to reunite with Tony and Tali.

=== Jenny Shepard ===
Jennifer Shepard
- NCIS character
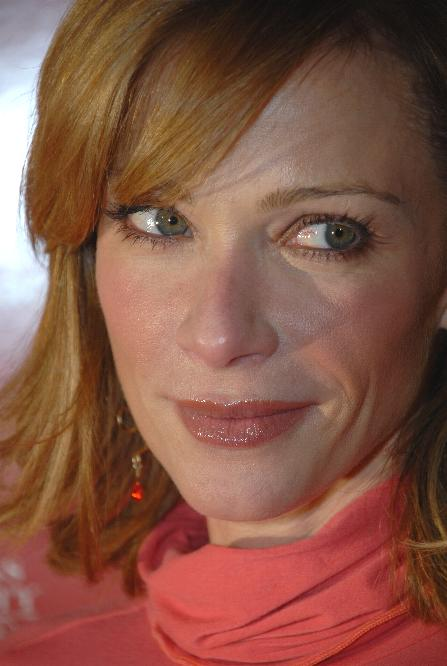
- First appearance: "Kill Ari, Part I"
- Last appearance: "Judgment Day"
- Created by: Donald P. Bellisario
- Portrayed by: Lauren Holly

In-universe information
- Nicknames: Jen; Jenny; Madam Director
- Title: Director
- Occupation: NCIS Director
- Affiliation: Naval Criminal Investigative Service
- Family: COL Jasper Shepard, US Army (father, deceased)

Jennifer "Jenny" Shepard (Lauren Holly) is the director of NCIS from season three to season five, replacing Thomas Morrow. She first appears in the episode "Kill Ari (Part I)". She was a military brat; her father, Jasper Shepard, was a colonel in the United States Army.

She is Gibbs' former partner and lover. While she and Gibbs were stationed in Europe, Gibbs was ordered back to the US and she was offered her own section in Europe. When Gibbs asked Jenny to go with him, she refused as she wished to advance her career to exact revenge on the arms dealer who killed her father. Jenny and Gibbs are reunited in "Kill Ari (Part I)", which stirs Gibbs' heart and opens up constant flirtation between her and Gibbs.

Shepard has a close relationship with Ziva David and occasionally provides her with key information on cases without going through regular channels or telling Gibbs, as in the season three episode "Head Case". They make it a point to keep these dealings confidential, arguing that "what Gibbs doesn't know can't hurt us". Later in the episode, though, Gibbs' remarks reveal that he already knows about her assistance. Shepard and Ziva have a working relationship prior to Shepard's being appointed Director of NCIS.

During season four, Director Shepard places Tony DiNozzo on an undercover assignment to get close to arms dealer René Benoit. The subplot comes to a head late in the season when it is revealed that Jenny blames Benoit for her father's death and that Benoit is now central to a major CIA deep-cover operation. Gibbs confronts Jenny over the operation, suggesting she is letting her emotions rule and has knowingly placed DiNozzo in danger and jeopardized a major CIA operation for the purposes of revenge.

During the episode "Internal Affairs", Gibbs tells Shepard that he thinks she is responsible for Benoit's murder, having seen Benoit leave without the gun she angrily tried to give him when he asked for her protection; this is reiterated when Gibbs looks through the FBI's file on Benoit's death in "Judgment Day" (Part 1).

In several episodes during season five, Jenny's failing health becomes a plot issue. For example, in "Stakeout", Ducky is shown ordering a test on a blood sample and tells Abby it is from a John Doe. However, when Abby talks to Jimmy Palmer, he says they have no John Does. Gibbs deduces, correctly, that the only person Ducky would "stick his neck out" for would be the director. In the next episode, "Dog Tags", Gibbs questions Jenny about her illness and she says she is fine. Her exact illness is never revealed; however, in "Stakeout", Abby tells Ducky there is an elevated level of creatine kinase in the blood sample she runs. Mike Franks also discovers Shepard's illness by going through her purse and finding her medication.

Shepard is killed in the episode "Judgment Day" (Part 1). Franks and Jenny are talking in an abandoned diner when she reveals that she regrets leaving Gibbs and is still in love with him. It is revealed that she botched an operation ten years prior, when she and Gibbs had been ordered to assassinate a pair of Russian crime lords and lovers. Gibbs shot the man, Anatoly Zhukov, but Jenny faced down the woman, Natasha (aka Svetlana), and let her live. Natasha sends assassins to kill Jenny in the diner; Jenny kills them all but dies of her injuries from the gunshot wounds she received. Franks, who is outside at the time of the shooting, returns to Jenny's house, where Natasha is trying to kill Gibbs, and Franks shoots her.

Gibbs and Franks decide to cover Jenny's mistake and death by burning down her Georgetown mansion. Jenny's cause of death given to the media is reported as "death in home fire". Her loss affects the rest of the characters greatly. Abby regrets that she never told Jenny she was a snappy dresser and says that would have made her smile. After Director Shepard's death, she is replaced by Assistant Director Leon Vance, who becomes the new Director of NCIS.

=== Leon Vance ===
Leon Vance
- NCIS character
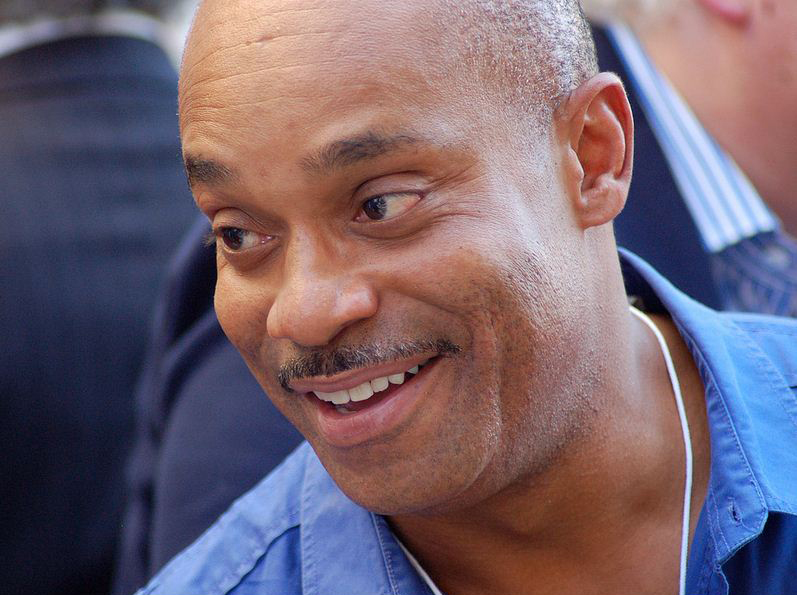
- First appearance: "Internal Affairs"
- Last appearance: "Sons and Daughters"
- Created by: Shane Brennan
- Portrayed by: Rocky Carroll

In-universe information
- Title: Director
- Occupation: NCIS Director
- Affiliation: Naval Criminal Investigative Service
- Spouses: Jacqueline "Jackie" Vance (née Thomas) (wife, deceased)
- Children: Kayla Vance (daughter); Jared Vance (son)
- Relatives: Lamar Addison (father-in-law); Michael Thomas (brother-in-law)

Leon James Vance (Rocky Carroll) first appears in the season five episode "Internal Affairs" as the assistant director of the NCIS, and is named Director after the death of Jenny Shepard due to his position and the line of succession.

In "Knockout" it is revealed that he was originally from Ohio, but grew up in Chicago where he trained to be a boxer. His wife states that Vance attended the United States Naval Academy and was commissioned as a 2nd lieutenant in the Marine Corps, but was forced to take a medical discharge before ever serving due to surgery to repair a detached retina suffered during his boxing career. However, Ducky later reveals to Gibbs that Vance's close childhood friend, Tyler Owens, who had died just prior to the start of the episode, also suffered a detached retina. Vance also reveals that it was this friend who decided that Vance should leave Chicago while he stayed behind. Vance says this despite his insistence to Gibbs that his friend was a Marine, though there is no record of his friend's service in the military. This episode strongly implies that Owens and Vance switched identities in order for the current Vance to have a future. In "Kill the Messenger," he undergoes surgery in order to obtain lung tissue samples for a biopsy because his doctor suspects that he has developed lymphoma. The tests reveal that he actually has sarcoidosis, a much less serious condition that quickly clears up on its own.

More of Vance's background is revealed in "Enemies Domestic", in season eight. To play the young Vance, Rocky Carroll underwent make-up procedures that he described as "a little instant facelift". In 1991, Vance was a student at the Naval War College in Rhode Island, and began to take an interest in black operations. He even imagines one himself: Operation Frankenstein, which would later play a big part in the season eight finale. NIS (later renamed NCIS) takes an interest in him and he is recruited by Special Agent Whitney Sharp.

Vance is trained by Sharp and after a six-week training course, leaves for an operation in Amsterdam, codenamed Trident. He meets his handler, Riley McAllister, who tells him that the target is a Russian agent known to Vance only as "The Russian", later known as Anatoly Zhukov. NIS believes he is bribing sailors for intelligence. Vance meets Eli David, a promising Mossad agent, who tells him he knows of the operation and that the Russian will kill him. Later, Eli betrays Vance to the Russian but it is revealed that this is so he can kill him himself. Eli also tells Vance he has been chosen because he is expendable and would not be missed. Eli and Vance kill the Russian's hit team, but the Russian manages to escape. Eli is unable to find him or who he was. Zhukov would later be killed by Gibbs in another black op in Paris with Jenny Shepard and William Decker. This leads to Decker and Jenny's deaths at the hands of Zhukov's lover Natalya before she is killed by Franks and her body burned with Jenny's mansion to cover up Shepard's mistakes.

Vance is credited with the elimination of the hit team and he starts to rise swiftly through the ranks at NCIS. He keeps believing, along with Eli, that there was a dirty agent in NCIS, who had really tipped off the Russian about Vance's mission. It is later revealed that this is McAllister; an expert on Russia, he saw that the Soviet Union's collapse had diverted attention onto the Middle East, and planned to have Vance killed by a Russian operative to show that Russia still posed a major threat, thus setting himself up for the directorship of NCIS. However, when this failed, McAllister assigned Gibbs, Shepard, and Decker to eliminate Zhukov to tie up loose ends and set up another scheme to have Vance and Eli eliminated. Vance survived, but was hospitalized. Eli also survived due to having sensed the trap in advance. McAllister then tried to do away with Vance himself in his hospital room, but thanks to Gibbs having sensed the plot, Vance mortally stabs McAllister with a switchblade Gibbs gave him earlier, ending the traitorous agent's life as he bleeds to death while Vance watches medical personnel try to save him.

Then-Assistant Director Vance takes over for Jenny Shepard during her leave of absence between "Internal Affairs" and "Judgment Day", establishing himself as a formidable presence with Gibbs and his team. He scatters Tony, McGee, and Ziva to various departments and assigns Gibbs a new team in the Season 6 premiere "Last Man Standing" upon being named director; however, it is later revealed that he did this to flush out a mole in the agency. Vance and Gibbs clash during this span, prompting a cold war between them, which ends with a détente in "Agent Afloat" at the start of season six. However, the two again clash later on because Gibbs feels he cannot fully trust Vance, though he cannot identify a specific reason why.

Vance spearheads the investigation into Shepard's death and is angered greatly when he is not kept in the loop by Gibbs and Mike Franks, who ultimately manipulate the situation to exonerate Shepard from her past failure, not what Vance had in mind. After Shepard's death, and possibly before, he lobbies the Secretary of the Navy hard to take over NCIS, as seen in "Cloak", but in "Semper Fidelis", the Secretary informs Gibbs of a major operation that will require Vance to serve as its head and that NCIS and the Navy will need Gibbs and Vance to get along.

Things come to a head in "Aliyah", when Gibbs accuses Vance of selling out his team to Mossad Director Eli David. Vance responds that Ziva is a plant, used to get Mossad a foothold in NCIS through Gibbs. Vance also reveals that he knows about the true story of the death of Ari Haswari. After this, the two of them realize that circumstances will prove one of them right. At the start of season seven, Vance approves Ziva's transfer to NCIS, proving that Gibbs was right and Ziva is loyal to NCIS. Despite his professional attitude toward Gibbs' team, Vance shows that he does care about them when Alejandro Rivera threatens Abby in "Spider and the Fly". He tells Rivera to leave before he gets hurt and when Rivera asks by whom, he replies angrily: "By me."

Even after the events of "Aliyah", Vance is shown to still be in official contact with Eli David in his capacity as director of Mossad. This is shown when he receives a text message on his phone from Eli which says only: "I found him". Vance also refuses to discuss a phone call from Eli with Gibbs, despite knowing how dangerous Eli is and despite his precarious relationship with Gibbs and his team. Upon being promoted to the director's position at the end of season five, Vance immediately goes to former Director Shepard's office, and is seen to shred a single mysterious document from his own personnel file.

It is revealed in season six ("Semper Fidelis") that the document was written by his supervising agent at the time. The Secretary of the Navy tells Gibbs that the file is a fabrication and that he thought all copies had been destroyed. It is further revealed in the season eight episode, "Enemies Domestic", that the head of the San Diego field office, when Vance was assigned there, had begun creating a legend for Vance that incorporated fictitious information about Vance in order to backstop a deep cover assignment, including the false information that Vance had been a pilot and director of a field office.

In the season nine finale, "Till Death Do Us Part", a bomb blast occurs at NCIS headquarters with Vance's whereabouts unknown. In the season 10 premiere, "Extreme Prejudice", it is revealed that he survived relatively unscathed. In the season 10 episode "Shabbat Shalom", Vance is widowed when his wife Jackie is shot and dies in surgery. Eli David also dies in the episode. In the Season 11 episode "Homesick", Jackie's estranged biological father Lamar Addison shows up at the family home, much to Vance's displeasure. It is revealed that he walked out on Jackie, her mother and brother when she was young and that he was never married to her mother.

Vance and Jackie have two children: a daughter, Kayla, and a son, Jared. Vance met his wife while attending a University of Maryland basketball game while Len Bias was playing. By season 10, Vance and Gibbs are on friendlier terms. Gibbs is particularly empathetic to Vance after his wife's murder since Gibbs himself went through a similar experience. Vance also prevents Gibbs' detention during a DOD internal investigation by allowing him to be temporarily assigned to JSOC.

In "Double Trouble", Vance is almost asked to resign after a confrontation with former NCIS Agent Kip Klugman, whom Vance arrested during his last case as a field agent in San Diego in 2005, until he and Gibbs are able to clear his name. In that episode, Secretary Porter mentions that Vance has been the Director of NCIS for longer than his two predecessors combined (at that point, just over 7 years).

In season sixteen, Vance is under surveillance by the CIA, following his abduction and torture by a terrorist at the end of the previous season.

In the season twenty-three episode "All Good Things," Vance is shot by corrupt Army CID agent Dolan Thompson after defusing a bomb in the NCIS evidence garage, in the midst of an attempt by the U.S. Department of Defense to shut down NCIS and merge with Army CID. Despite Palmer's and Parker's attempts to save him, he dies, with a young version of the now deceased Ducky seen guiding him into the afterlife. He then reunites with Jackie.

=== Dr. James "Jimmy" Palmer ===
Jimmy Palmer
- NCIS character
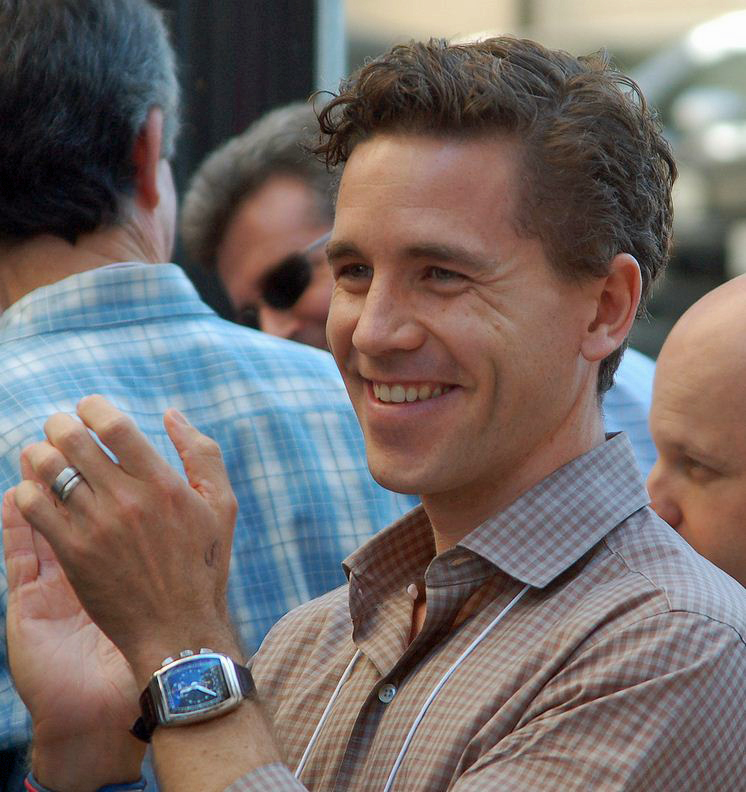
- First appearance: "Split Decision"
- Created by: Donald P. Bellisario
- Portrayed by: Brian Dietzen

In-universe information
- Titles: Assistant Medical Examiner (2004–2019); Acting Chief Medical Examiner (2012; 2017–2019); Chief Medical Examiner (2019–)
- Occupation: Medical Examiner
- Affiliation: Naval Criminal Investigative Service
- Spouses: Breena Palmer (née Slater) (wife, deceased)
- Significant other: Jessica "Jess" Knight (ex-girlfriend)
- Children: Victoria Elizabeth Palmer (daughter)
- Relatives: Ed Slater (father-in-law); Stevie Slater (brother-in-law)

Dr. James "Jimmy" Palmer (Brian Dietzen) is an assistant medical examiner who first appears in the episode "Split Decision". After Gerald Jackson is incapacitated, Palmer becomes Mallard's assistant. He was named after former Baltimore Orioles pitcher Jim Palmer, but does not like baseball.

He self-identifies as a sufferer of a "mild" case of diabetes mellitus in the episode "In the Dark". He often seems intimidated by Gibbs, especially when he goes into one of his trademark strange rambling explanations of something that has not been requested.

Mallard claims that he and Palmer frequently arrive at crime scenes well after Gibbs and his team because Palmer is a horrible driver who keeps getting lost; Palmer tries to defend himself by pointing out that Mallard is navigating.

Jimmy is the central character of the season 5 episode "About Face" where he must recover his memory to find a suspect to a murder case and his attempted killer.

Like Ducky, Palmer speaks to the dead, though he is far more irreverent, sometimes raising not only eyebrows but doubts about his analytic abilities in the process.

Some episodes depict an ongoing illicit office romance between Jimmy and Michelle Lee. They make excuses for working late and are seen entering and exiting the underside of the autopsy table. In the episode "Last Man Standing", Palmer admits to Gibbs and Vance that he and Agent Lee had been "doing it" for a while, but he had broken it off because he felt "used" – an important bit of information about Lee's character, as a bit of dramatic irony reveals at the end of that episode.

In "The Good Wives Club", it is revealed that Jimmy is claustrophobic; when he is entering the enclosed hallway he is seen sweating profusely and when he has to go get the body bag he freaks out about having to go back through it.

In "About Face", as Jimmy is being hypnotised by Abby, it seems that Jimmy has a shoe fetish, as he dreamily talks in detail about Ziva and Abby's footwear instead of recalling information about the current case. The episode also indicates that his mother's name is Eunice. In the episode "Bounce" we see that Palmer regularly helps Tony when he is in charge, despite the fact that Tony has frequently mocked Palmer by calling him an "autopsy gremlin". Palmer is also shown to have severe tinnitus.

Season seven reveals that Jimmy is in love with a girl named Breena Slater (Michelle Pierce), who works as a mortician in her family's funeral parlor and appears in the episode "Mother's Day". In the season eight finale, "Pyramid", NCIS special agent E.J. Barrett congratulates Jimmy on his engagement, and in the season nine premiere "Nature of the Beast", Ziva says that they are getting married next spring. In "Newborn King", Palmer is accompanied to NCIS headquarters by Breena's father, Ed Slater. Ed alternates between grating on the nerves of the entire team and mocking Palmer's career choice. Most of the team either ignore Ed or quietly tolerate his rudeness out of respect for Palmer and his guest. Abby is the exception—when Ed makes a comment regarding the supposed promiscuity of tattooed women, she places Palmer and Slater in "time out" by locking them in her office. Palmer eventually tires of Ed's behavior, telling him to sit down and shut up. The end of the episode shows Ed accepting Palmer and expressing a desire for a grandchild.

In "Till Death Do Us Part", prior to a bomb blast at the NCIS headquarters, Palmer and Breena decide to get married on the spot so he can assist the rest of the team in the Harper Dearing case. In episode "Damned If You Do", Jimmy tells Ducky that he and Breena are on a waiting list to adopt a child. In the season 11 episode "The Admiral's Daughter," it is revealed to Jimmy through a word game that Breena is pregnant. Breena gives birth to the baby girl in the season twelve episode "We Build, We Fight", and they name her Victoria Elizabeth Palmer after Ducky's mother, with Ducky as her "Grand-Ducky".

During his first few seasons, Jimmy is portrayed as a geek with a tendency to ramble or speak out of turn, much to the irritation of Gibbs and even Ducky on occasions. When he first starts, as with most "newbies", he is subjected to some teasing by DiNozzo. By season ten, he is shown as more of a surrogate son to Ducky rather than simply his assistant (though this relationship has been implied throughout the series). In "Extreme Prejudice", he insists on remaining at Ducky's bedside until Ducky convinces him that NCIS needs him more. In the season fourteen episode "Keep Going", Jimmy confesses to a victim's son that he is now a qualified doctor, having passed his Medical Examiner test (on the third time; he had failed it twice before), but doesn't want the rest of the team to know. However, everyone finds out because he was speaking in front of a mic, and Ducky congratulates him.

In season 15, Jimmy takes over as NCIS' Acting Chief Medical Examiner after Ducky takes a sabbatical from NCIS to teach at a New York City medical school, which is extended for Ducky to write a book about his cases and further in season 16 to go on a book tour. In "Bears and Cubs", Ducky announces his official retirement from his full-time NCIS position and permanently promotes Jimmy to Chief Medical Examiner.

In season 17, work is starting to consume Jimmy and devour his time. In episode 13, "Sound Off", he is clearly overwhelmed, complaining of only getting 14 minutes of sleep on an autopsy table and in episode 15, "Lonely Hearts", is forced to cancel his plans for Valentine's Day as he has to work overtime to help Gibbs and the team solve a complicated murder case.

In episode 19, titled "Blarney", as Jimmy and Kasie eat breakfast together, their morning is interrupted by three armed robbers who decide to hold them hostage after a burglary goes bad.

The season 18 episode "The First Day" reveals that Breena died from COVID-19 in December 2020, and that Jimmy was unable to see her before she died because of COVID lockdowns. He was also forced to grieve alone and was unable to give her a real memorial.

Dietzen co-wrote the season 19 episode "The Helpers", in which a bio-terror attack exposes Jimmy and Kasie to a deadly toxin. In the episode, which TV Insider called the best episode of the season, Jimmy begins to come to terms with the loss of his wife; he takes off his wedding ring, saying "I decided to take Breena's advice. I can hold onto what's important while letting go. It's time."

Season 19, episode 15, "Thick as Thieves," Knight asks Palmer to be her plus-one at a wedding. Romantic tensions are built up throughout the rest of the season, with them admitting their feelings for each other in episode 20, "All or Nothing," and finally kissing and making it official in the season finale.

=== Eleanor "Ellie" Bishop ===
Ellie Bishop
- NCIS character
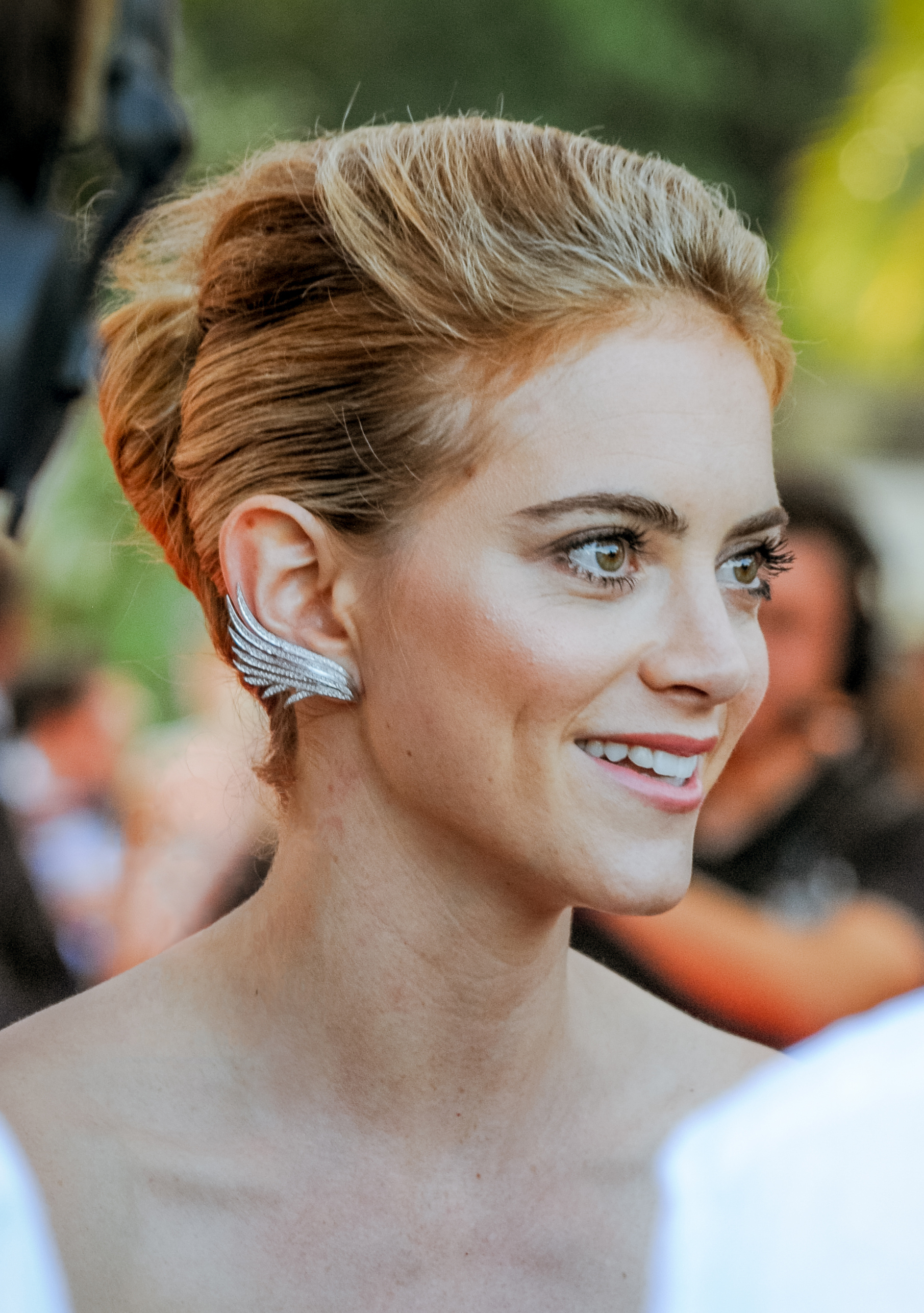
- First appearance: "Gut Check"
- Last appearance: "Her"
- Created by: Gary Glasberg
- Portrayed by: Emily Wickersham

In-universe information
- Occupation: Former NCIS Special Agent; Former NSA Analyst
- Affiliation: Naval Criminal Investigative Service
- Spouse: Jake Malloy (ex-husband)
- Significant others: Qasim Nasir (fiance, deceased)
- Relatives: Barbara Bishop (mother); George Bishop (brother); Robbie Bishop (brother); John Bishop (brother)

Eleanor Raye "Ellie" Bishop (Emily Wickersham) is an NSA analyst who first appears in the season 11 episode "Gut Check". Bishop is a "country girl" from Oklahoma and has three older brothers.

Described by her boss at the NSA as a "reclusive data freak", Bishop claims that she "remembers almost everything she reads" and often thinks while sitting cross-legged on the floor. She has a love of food and is often shown eating snacks at her desk. She also tends to associate specific memories with whatever food she was eating at the time. As such, her coworkers refer to her as a foodie.

She applied to NCIS before taking the job with the NSA and Gibbs invites her to a "joint duty assignment". Gibbs later offers her a probationary position as a special agent in "Monsters and Men", affectionately referring to her as "probie" for the first time, officially filling the open position left by Ziva David. After that, DiNozzo and McGee are seen pulling the seniority card by ordering her around to do more menial tasks, such as evidence collection.

Bishop is repeatedly shown as a bit of a perfectionist, sometimes asking for second tries, knowing she can do better the next time around. Alex Quinn has remarked that she is too tightly wound.

When first introduced, DiNozzo and McGee quickly notice her wedding band, but she remains coy when asked about her marital status. It is eventually revealed that she is married and her husband's name is Jake Malloy (Jamie Bamber), an attorney for the NSA. They met during their first week at NSA, though they appear to be having marital difficulties during season thirteen.

In "Day in Court", Jake reveals he is having an affair with a fellow NSA Agent. Bishop is horrified and the two separate, with Bishop going home to Oklahoma to get some distance. She later returns to DC to continue with NCIS and tells Jake that their marriage has been deteriorating quickly since she joined NCIS. Despite him wanting to make things work, she has already decided to file for divorce. She sees Gibbs as a father figure and leans on him.

After her divorce, she prefers to stay single for a while. It is revealed in "Enemy Combatant" that Bishop is dating NCIS translator Qasim Naasir, last seen in season twelve. Unfortunately, the relationship ends abruptly when Qasim dies from injuries sustained in an attack by a criminal that the NCIS team had been tracking, leaving Bishop grief-stricken and hellbent on exacting revenge for Qasim's murder. Quinn is extremely concerned about her well-being, especially as she eavesdrops on her asking MI6 officer Clayton Reeves to translate the files Qasim was assigned to assist with the case. It is revealed that Qasim proposed to Bishop a few weeks before he died. She asked him for some time to think, and he agreed. Bishop planned to accept the night he died but never had the chance.

While Gibbs and McGee were held prisoner in Paraguay between seasons 14 and 15, Bishop, as the ranking agent, served as the supervisory special agent (SSA) of the Major Case Response Team; she retained command until Gibbs was medically and psychologically cleared for duty. In the episode "High Tide", Bishop and fellow agent Nick Torres go on an undercover mission, which revolves around them both acting like a couple. Both of them find that they enjoy the experience and develop a mutual lingering attraction toward each other. In the episode "Sight Unseen", Bishop appears jealous upon seeing Torres on a date with a blind witness.

In the season 15 episode "Skeleton Crew", Bishop tells Nick that in her teenage years, she was a loner type and was relentlessly mocked and bullied and given the name "Scarecrow". The episode "Fragments" reveals that Bishop spends a few days every year away to "unplug" for her "mental reset", where she spends time without electronics. It is hinted that she spent it with Torres.

She is shown to be dating a man named Boyd in "Toil and Trouble" and claims it to be serious, with it being date number 5; however, his contact is not saved on her phone. Torres cancels her date with him, leading to her being angry at him, though she forgives him in the next episode, "The Last Link," when he buys her bacon brown sugar chips.

In the season 16 episode "She," Bishop learns from CIA agent Odette Malone that Ziva is still alive.

The season 17 episode "Institutionalized" reveals that Bishop is from Hinton, Oklahoma, where she was chosen to be the Grand Marshall of its Tater Tot Parade in the past. In "On Fire", Torres and Bishop are hit by a car driven by Xavier Zolotov, with Torres getting the worse of the injuries. After Xavier gets away with the crime due to sovereign immunity, Bishop storms off with the intent of killing him. Xavier is revealed to be dead in the next scene, though Bishop confirms she did not kill him, McGee begins to suspect that Gibbs may have killed him to protect her. In this episode, it is hinted that Bishop has feelings for Torres.

In season 18, Bishop is kidnapped and taken hostage during a stakeout by a terrorist, who agrees to exchange her at an airport for one of his men that they presumably have in custody. The whole thing turns out to be a ruse and the plane explodes, but Bishop escapes unharmed, albeit with a few cuts and bruises. In the same week ("1mm"), she and Torres are trapped in cells rigged to blow, with Bishop standing on the pressure plate that triggers the bomb. They both escape unscathed when Gibbs comes to rescue them, but not before she and Torres confess to having feelings for each other. From this episode on, they begin calling each other by their first names, rather than their last.

In the episode "Misconduct", while interrogating a girl who claims to be in love with a criminal named Parker James, Bishop puts on the persona of a die-hard romantic, even going as far as to mention that she has someone really special to her with whom she trusts her life, hinting it to be Torres, alluding to their relationship.

Bishop resigns from NCIS after confessing to leaking NSA secrets and goes on a long-term DOD undercover mission with Odette Malone.

=== Nick Torres ===
Nick Torres
- NCIS character
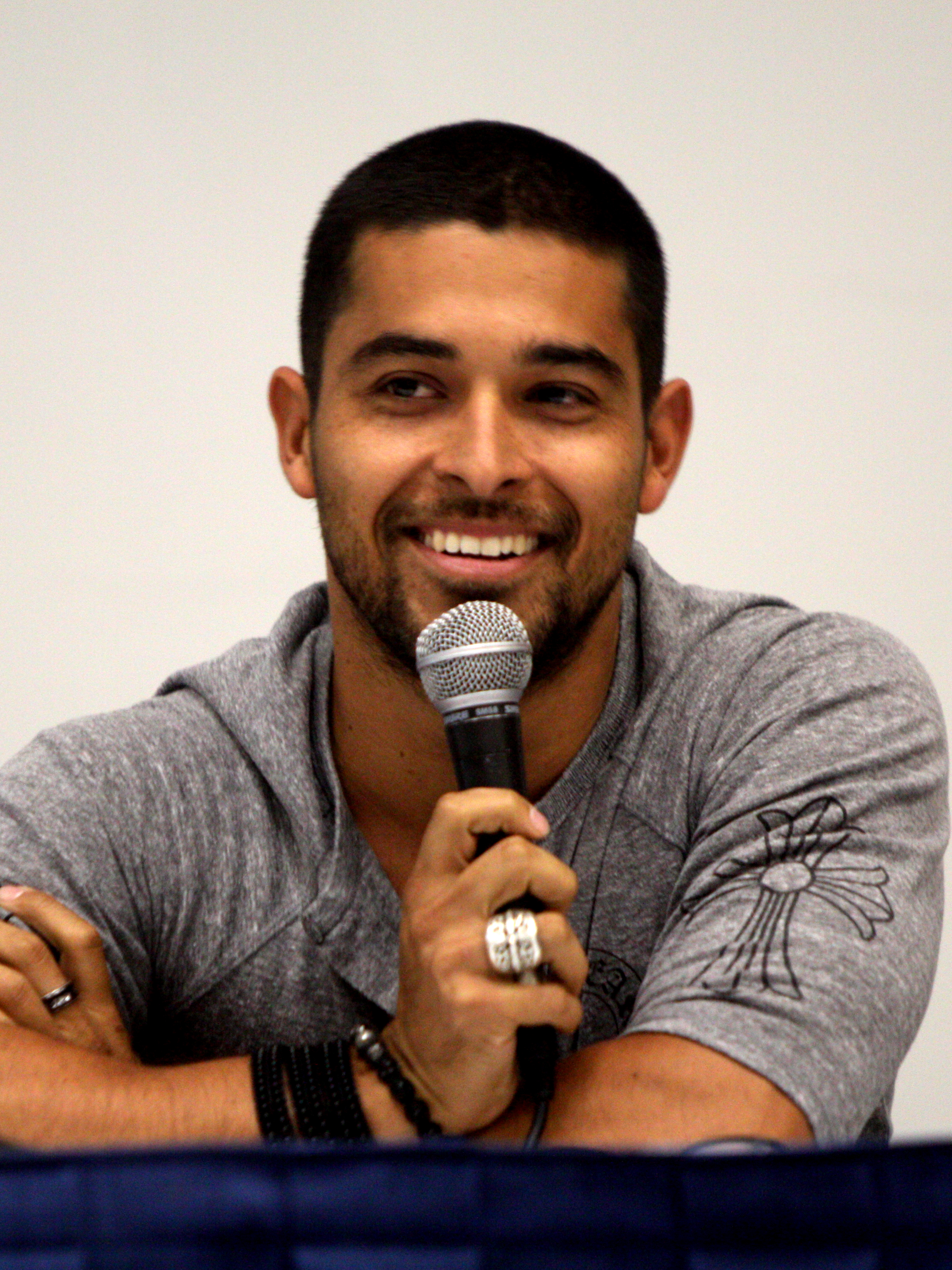
- First appearance: "Rogue"
- Created by: Donald P. Bellisario
- Portrayed by: Wilmer Valderrama

In-universe information
- Occupation: NCIS Special Agent; Former Undercover Agent
- Affiliation: Naval Criminal Investigative Service
- Significant other: Robin Knight (girlfriend)
- Relatives: Lucia Campbell (sister); Amanda Campbell (niece)

Nicholas Torres (Wilmer Valderrama) is an undercover agent who first appears in the season 14 premiere, "Rogue". Nick has been an NCIS deep cover agent for years, but when his cover is blown and he learns his sister's life could be in danger, he races back to DC in an ill-fated attempt to stop it. His mission crosses over with that of Gibbs' team. However, after working with them to bring down his sister's attackers, he is offered a spot on the team with Alex Quinn.

Torres often has trouble readjusting to a normal life and working with a team; he is thus reluctant to wear the NCIS windbreaker or cap when visiting crime scenes. Being undercover for so long has given him a range of skills such as close combat training, but his methods are a bit unpredictable: e.g., such as drawing a gunman's attention by jumping onto a poker table with McGee holding them at gunpoint.

Torres is also not afraid to break rules if he needs to, which on occasion has him butting heads with Gibbs. He is very charismatic, has a sense of humor and is very adept in social situations; he once got a suspect to talk by offering her a candy bar. He has a picture of himself on his desk as a reminder of a woman he loved but lost to cancer as a teenager. Torres is superstitious of anything relating to the dead; once forgoing an apartment where the resident had recently died and proclaiming he could never work in a cemetery because of this.

He also strikes up a friendly rivalry with Clayton Reeves, and they both try to one-up each other—from undercover tactics to arm-wrestling contests. In the episode "High Tide", Torres and Ellie Bishop go on an undercover mission, which revolves around them both acting like a couple. Both of them find that they enjoy the experience and develop a mutual lingering attraction towards each other. In the episode "Death from Above", it is revealed that Torres has feelings for Bishop. Throughout season 17, Ziva David encourages Torres to reveal his feelings for Bishop, as their relationship mirrors her own with Anthony DiNozzo.

In season 16 episode "Mona Lisa", Torres is drugged and led to believe he killed someone in cold blood. During this time, Bishop begins to doubt his innocence, and while he was cleared of all wrongdoing, Torres is deeply hurt by Bishop's lack of faith, saying outright he would not have done the same to her. At the same time, he begins to doubt his own innocence, wondering what the difference between him and a cold-blooded killer is.

In the season 17 episode "On Fire", Torres and Bishop are hit by a car, with Torres pushing Bishop out of the way, leading him to end up with more severe injuries. He flatlines once, and the experience leads Bishop to hint at her feelings for him. In the following episode, "Lonely Hearts", he returns to work but is still somewhat injured and finally decides to rest longer with Bishop's little push.

In the sixth episode of season 18, "1mm", Bishop and Torres are trapped in cells rigged to blow, with Bishop standing on the pressure plate that triggers the bomb. They both escape unscathed when Gibbs comes to rescue them, but not before she and Torres confess to having feelings for each other. From this episode on, they begin calling each other by their first names, rather than their last.

In the season 18 episode "Sangre", Torres' absentee father returns, and is a suspect in a murder. Torres refuses to let him back into his life, due to the fact that he walked out on him and his family when he was five. Bishop tries to get Torres to give his father a chance, and he does at the end of the episode, when he invites his father to get dinner together. In the end, however, Torres goes to pick up his father only to find that he has left again, and goes to join Gibbs, the closest thing to a dad he has, for dinner.

In the season 22 episode "Baker's Man", Torres struggles with telling fellow agent and teammate Jessica Knight that he is dating her sister Robin. When Knight finds out, she is furious, but eventually accepts the relationship.

=== Alexandra Quinn ===
Alex Quinn
- NCIS character
- First appearance: "Rogue"
- Last appearance: "Rendezvous"
- Created by: Donald P. Bellisario
- Portrayed by: Jennifer Esposito

In-universe information
- Occupation: NCIS Special Agent; Former Field and FLETC Agent
- Affiliation: Naval Criminal Investigative Service
- Significant other: Mike (ex-fiancé)
- Relatives: Unnamed father (deceased); Marie Quinn (mother)

Alex Quinn (Jennifer Esposito) joins Gibbs' team after 15 years assigned to the Federal Law Enforcement Training Center (FLETC). Before that she was a field agent, but after her partner was killed in an ambush while the two were following suspects, and her engagement to Mike fell apart, she left the field.

Quinn met Gibbs when he was a part of the team investigating her partner's death. She has a sister in her twenties and a mother who is later revealed to be developing Alzheimer's. She is described as having "sharp wit, quick mind and immense talent as a federal agent".

Quinn prides herself on remembering every agent she's ever trained, including McGee, Bishop, and Torres.

Quinn leaves the team at the end of Season 14 to take care of her ailing mother.

=== Clayton Reeves ===
Clayton Reeves
- NCIS character
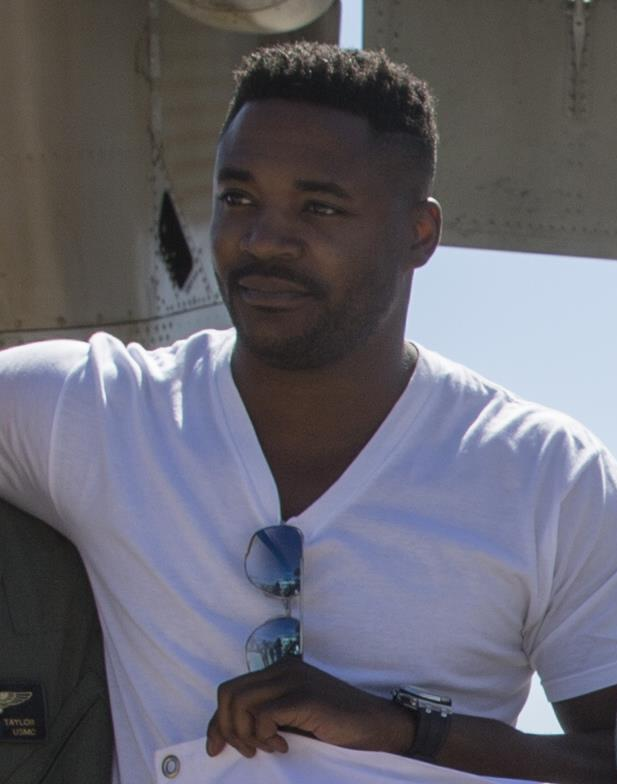
- First appearance: "Dead Letter"
- Last appearance: "Two Steps Back"
- Created by: Gary Glasberg
- Portrayed by: Duane Henry

In-universe information
- Occupation: MI6 Operative
- Affiliation: Naval Criminal Investigative Service
- Nationality: British

Clayton Dante Reeves (Duane Henry) is a British MI6 Intelligence Operative who first encounters the NCIS team working abroad with DiNozzo.

Upon returning to the US, Clayton is attacked by Trent Kort, whom he later shoots and kills.

He first appears in season 13, and returns as a main character for season 14. In "Pay to Play", he returns, now working at NCIS's International Desk. Because his desk is behind the bullpen of the team, a running gag is he tends to pop up unexpectedly with information in regards to the case at hand.

After a botched undercover job to capture the terrorist Chen, he secretly works with Bishop to find a lead on him and arrest him, despite Gibbs ordering them both to stand down. Reeves has many skills from his career as an MI6 agent and brings those skills to the team when needed, ranging from computer forensics to piloting for his undercover work. While friendly and charming to everyone he meets, he strikes up a rivalry with Torres; both are seasoned undercover agents and generally try to one up each other.

During season 15, it is revealed he is a recovering alcoholic as he often drank to cope with the stresses of his undercover operations. His past is unknown, but he lost his mother at a very young age and was homeless. In an effort to honor her and as part of his recovery, Clayton volunteers at a program that helps homeless veterans and their kids.

He is shot twice and killed at the very end of "One Step Forward" by Kent Marshall hired by Robert King to kill Abby. Devastated by his death, Abby leaves NCIS to escort Reeves' body back to London for his funeral and to start a homeless charity in honor of Reeves and his mother.

=== Dr. Jacqueline Sloane ===
Jacqueline Sloane
- NCIS character
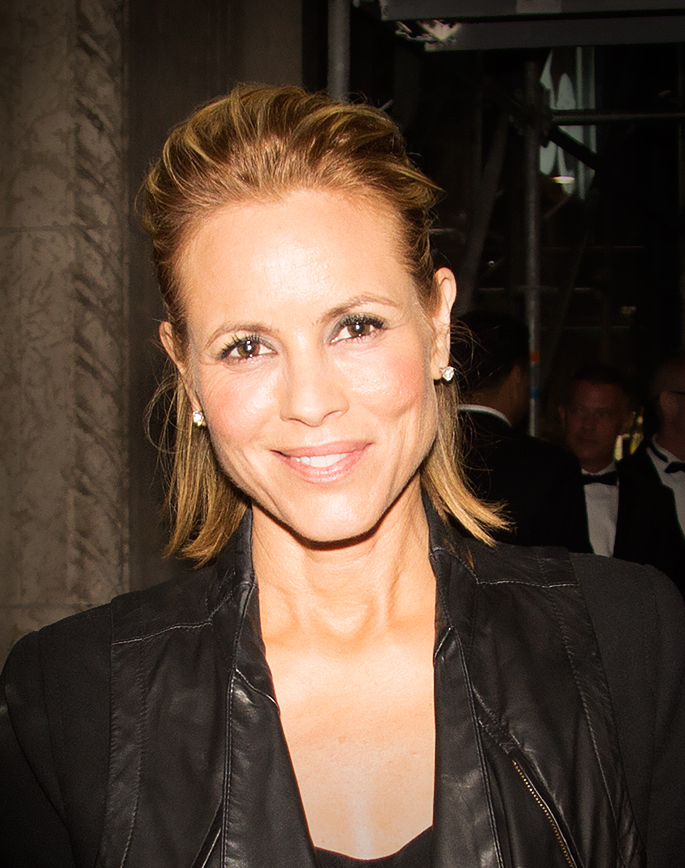
- First appearance: "Skeleton Crew"
- Last appearance: "True Believer"
- Created by: Gary Glasberg
- Portrayed by: Maria Bello

In-universe information
- Title: Operation Psychologist
- Occupation: NCIS Senior Special Agent
- Affiliation: Naval Criminal Investigative Service
- Children: Faith Tolliver (biological daughter)

Dr. Jacqueline "Jack" Sloane (Maria Bello) is an NCIS senior special agent and operational psychologist, specializing in profiling. She holds a Ph.D. in psychology, and is a former Lieutenant in the United States Army.

Sloane served in Afghanistan, where she was a prisoner of war. The memories of this experience are shown to often have a serious effect on Sloane, but also allow her to connect with people suffering from similar trials. Sloane transferred from the Southwest Field Office in San Diego to NCIS Headquarters at the behest of Director Vance during season 15.

As a running gag in season 17, Sloane is often teased that she and Gibbs are in a relationship by members of the team. While this is largely speculation, Sloane does appear to have feelings for Gibbs and the two do share a close bond, as Gibbs was the only one, outside of Vance, who was aware of Sloane's biological daughter.

The season 16 episode "Perennial" introduces Sloane's biological daughter, Faith Tolliver, who Sloane put up for adoption immediately after giving birth. In season 17 episode "Schooled" reveals Sloane became pregnant after she was sexually assaulted by a friend in college and gave up Faith to protect her from her father. Faith became aware of this after asking Jack for the medical history of both of her parents and despite Sloane's attempts to hide the real reason behind her daughter's birth, Faith is grateful for it as she gave her a great life and reconciled her relationship with her mother. In the season 18 episode "The First Day", Sloane reveals to Gibbs that she wants to leave NCIS to try new things, and is putting down an offer for a house in Costa Rica. In the next episode "True Believer", after rescuing kidnapped girls in Afghanistan, Sloane decides to stay there instead and help others in need, sharing a goodbye kiss with Gibbs.

=== Kasie Hines ===
Kasie Hines
- NCIS character
- First appearance: "One Man's Trash"
- Created by: Donald P. Bellisario
- Portrayed by: Diona Reasonover

In-universe information
- Occupation: NCIS Forensic Specialist
- Affiliation: Naval Criminal Investigative Service

Kasie Hines is the current NCIS forensics specialist and a graduate student at the medical school in New York where Ducky is guest teaching in season 15.

Ducky hires her as his assistant to help keep him on schedule on a book he is writing about past cases. However, when a past cold case resurfaces in "One Man's Trash", Ducky returns to NCIS to assist in the investigation, bringing a reluctant Kasie along with him to help and meet his co-workers. While Kasie is friendly towards most of Gibbs' team to the point of giving hugs, she is noticeably cold towards Abby Sciuto, making no attempts to connect with her despite staying in her guest room. This frustrates Abby, who believes that Kasie does not like her despite her attempts to be friendly, especially since, as Abby later learns from Ducky, Kasie has a degree in forensic science.

After witnessing Kasie encourage Ducky to use the case to inspire his creativity for the book, Abby confronts Kasie, who admits that she is a fan of Abby's work and freaked out internally when she met her, and the two develop a close friendship. Following Abby's resignation from NCIS, Gibbs hires Kasie in "Fallout" to fill in for her temporarily until he finds a permanent replacement, which she agrees to do with Abby's blessing. However, this slightly unsettles the rest of the members of Gibbs' team, who are still trying to cope with Abby's departure and Reeves’ death. Kasie becomes the permanent replacement forensics specialist in Season 16.

=== Jessica Knight ===
Jessica Knight
- NCIS character
- First appearance: "Blown Away"
- Created by: Donald P. Bellisario
- Portrayed by: Katrina Law

In-universe information
- Occupation: NCIS Special Agent
- Affiliation: Naval Criminal Investigative Service
- Significant other: James "Jimmy" Palmer (boyfriend)

Jessica Knight (Katrina Law) is an NCIS Special Agent, who was formerly assigned to the REACT Unit in the Washington Navy Yard.

After Bishop's departure, Knight, who had once been a member of an NCIS REACT team, with her fellow NCIS colleagues all dying in an explosion, and who had temporarily assisted the team, subsequently joined the main NCIS Major Case Response Team in October 2021.

Knight is first introduced in Season 18's penultimate episode, "Blown Away", as she helps the Major Case Response Team (at that time under the lead of Tim McGee after Gibbs' suspension) to catch the one behind the bombing of her teammates. Despite being injured and the only survivor, Jessica is determined to help the team solve the case. Her no-nonsense attitude and strong will are a fun match-up with the team's laid-back behavior as they work the case.

Knight speaks fluent Chinese and was a Division I track star in college.

In a character bio published in Deadline, Knight is described as "a formidable REACT (Regional Enforcement Action Capabilities Training Team) agent who specializes in hostage negotiations and handles daily high-risk operations with skill and precision. Sharp, athletic and tough, she was raised by a single father and had to fight for everything in life. She is fiercely tenacious and with a wry sense of humor.

Law's character quickly proves to be likable. She is loyal, and she wants to help. While there is a bit of a wild side to her, she was quick to step in to help clear Bishop's name without even knowing who Bishop really is.

In episode 9, "Collective Memory", Knight admits that she & her mother have not spoken in months. She does not say anything else, but "my mom and I, it's complicated." As Torres sees it, however, if they love each other, it is not as complicated as she thinks, so after the case is wrapped up, Knight reaches out to her mother.

In episode 15, "Thick as Thieves," Knight asks Palmer to be her plus-one at a wedding. Romantic tensions are built up throughout the rest of the season, with them admitting their feelings for each other in episode 20, "All or Nothing," and finally kissing and making it official in the season finale.

=== Alden Parker ===
Alden Parker
- NCIS character
- First appearance: "Nearly Departed"
- Created by: Donald P. Bellisario
- Portrayed by: Gary Cole

In-universe information
- Occupation: NCIS Supervisory Agent; FBI Special Agent (former)
- Affiliation: Naval Criminal Investigative Service; Federal Bureau of Investigation (formerly); United States Marine Corps (formerly)

Alden Parker is the current Supervisory Special Agent of the NCIS Major Case Response Team and a former FBI Special Agent. He acquires the supervisory position at NCIS after former NCIS Supervisory Agent Leroy Jethro Gibbs decides to stay in Alaska and not return to NCIS, having found a sense of peace that he hadn't felt in the thirty years since his wife and daughter were killed by Pedro Hernandez.

Parker becomes acquainted with NCIS in June 2021, when he is pursuing a serial killer whom Gibbs and local reporter Marcie Warren are attempting to arrest. Later, he and a few other FBI agents are sent to arrest Gibbs after Gibbs had been "avoiding the law for so long", but he has a change of heart at the end of "Great Wide Open" when he decides not to follow through on the arrest.

After Gibbs decides not to return to NCIS, he recommends Parker, who has since been fired by the FBI for not arresting Gibbs, for the job once McGee declines to take the position. Parker accepts after the events of "Face the Strange", filling the Supervisory Agent position that Gibbs had had for 25 years.

In the season 22 finale episode "Nexus", he finds himself involved in a clash between his nemesis Carla Marino and the international mob cartel Nexus. Marino lures Parker into forming an uneasy alliance to take down the cartel's nuclear threat. In the two-part season 23 premiere "Prodigal Son", Parker goes on a rogue hunting mission to track down Marino, who is later revealed to actually be the leader of Nexus and the one who murdered Parker’s father, Roman, as an act of vengeance over blaming him for the death of her son. Despite his sister, Navy Vice Admiral Harriet Parker, having him briefly arrested after faking his own death and hiding in Gibbs' cabin, Parker is allowed to go with his NCIS team to Cuba to track down Marino,; she is killed, ending the threat. He reconciles with Harriet as they honor their father in remembrance.

== Notable recurring and guest characters ==
=== E.J. Barrett ===
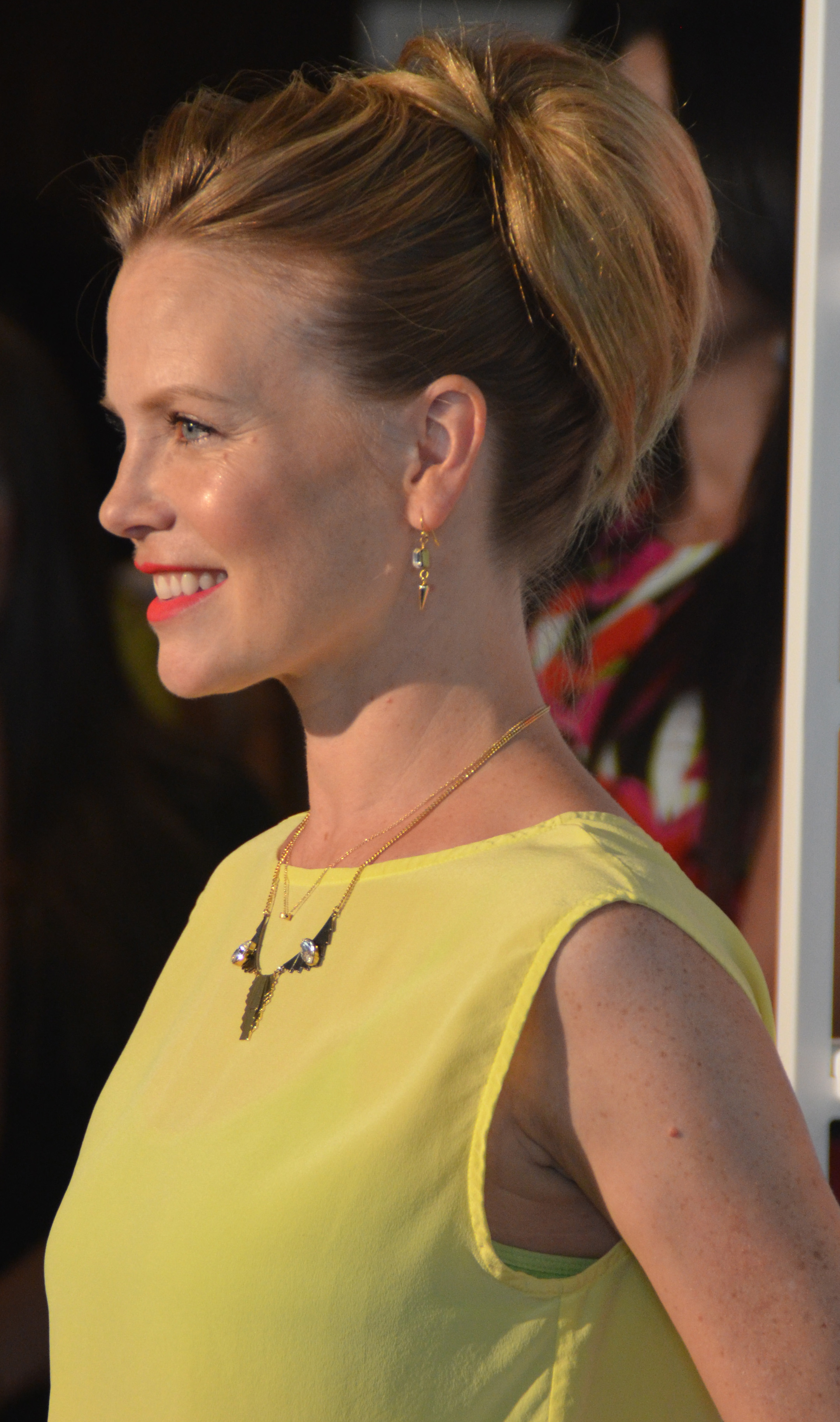
Sarah Jane Morris played E.J. Barrett.

Erica Jane "E.J." Barrett (Sarah Jane Morris) is an NCIS agent reassigned to Washington in the season eight episode "One Last Score". She was originally a Major Case Response Team leader stationed in Rota, Spain, which attracts DiNozzo's attention as he had previously been offered the same position in the season four episode "Singled Out", though he does not resent her position as he turned the offer down to stay in Washington.

Barrett's presence is a source of tension between Gibbs and Director Vance, as Gibbs initially believes Barrett was reassigned to Washington because of budget cuts. However, in the episode "Two-Faced", it is revealed that Barrett is stationed in Washington to track a serial killer known as the "Port-to-Port Killer" (or P2P for short). When one of the killer's victims is found within the MCRT's jurisdiction, Vance puts together a task force to capture the killer, appointing Barrett as lead investigator. Gibbs begins to suspect Barrett and DiNozzo are in a relationship and dividing the loyalties of the team, and is so distrusting of her that he questions her very motivations for being an NCIS agent, opposing her in everything from interrogating a suspect to profiling the killer. In the season eight finale, "Pyramid", it is revealed that E.J. is the former Navy Secretary Philip Davenport's niece.

E.J. and her team are ambushed by the P2P at the end of "Swan Song". Her team members Gayne Levin and Simon Cade are shot and Levin is killed. E.J. survives, but is left in the trunk of a car. After being rescued by Gibbs, she is taken hostage by the P2P but is again rescued by Gibbs. E.J. then gives up her post at NCIS, but not before removing a little microchip from Levin's arm. Gibbs leaves the door open for her, having finally warmed to her. At the end of season eight, DiNozzo is tasked with dealing with an agent who is selling top-secret information. In the season nine premiere, "Nature of the Beast", Tony stops E.J. from running away with the microchip. E.J. then reveals that Levin asked her to bring the microchip to Navy Captain Felix Wright if anything happened to him.

However, the captain is subsequently murdered and E.J. and Tony are targeted by an unknown killer. They turn to Gibbs for help and E.J. says that she does not know what is on the microchip. She meets with her team member Simon Cade in an alley. DiNozzo steps in and wants to arrest Cade, and reveals that he was the agent selling top-secret information. However, Cade knows nothing about it and all three realize that they have been used. They then get shot, Cade fatally, E.J. in the stomach and Tony in his shoulder.

Their shooter appears to be Casey Stratton, seemingly an FBI agent, but not known by the FBI itself. E.J. then goes into hiding to escape Stratton's attention, leaving both NCIS and Stratton looking for her. A petty officer she had called for help dies at the hands of an unknown assassin. Gibbs and his team investigate the murder, reuniting them with E.J. in "Housekeeping". After they apprehend the assassin who had been tracking E.J. for the past year, she and Tony reconcile, and she returns to her home on vacation.

=== Agah Bayar ===
Agah Bayar (Tamer Hassan) is an international Turkish arms dealer, who first appeared in the season eight episode "Broken Arrow". He had a brief appearance in the episode "Kill Screen" and returned in the season nine episode "Need to Know" and the season 12 episode Lost Boys. Gibbs does not like Bayar, as he seems to avoid trouble with federal agencies too easily.

=== Merton Bell ===
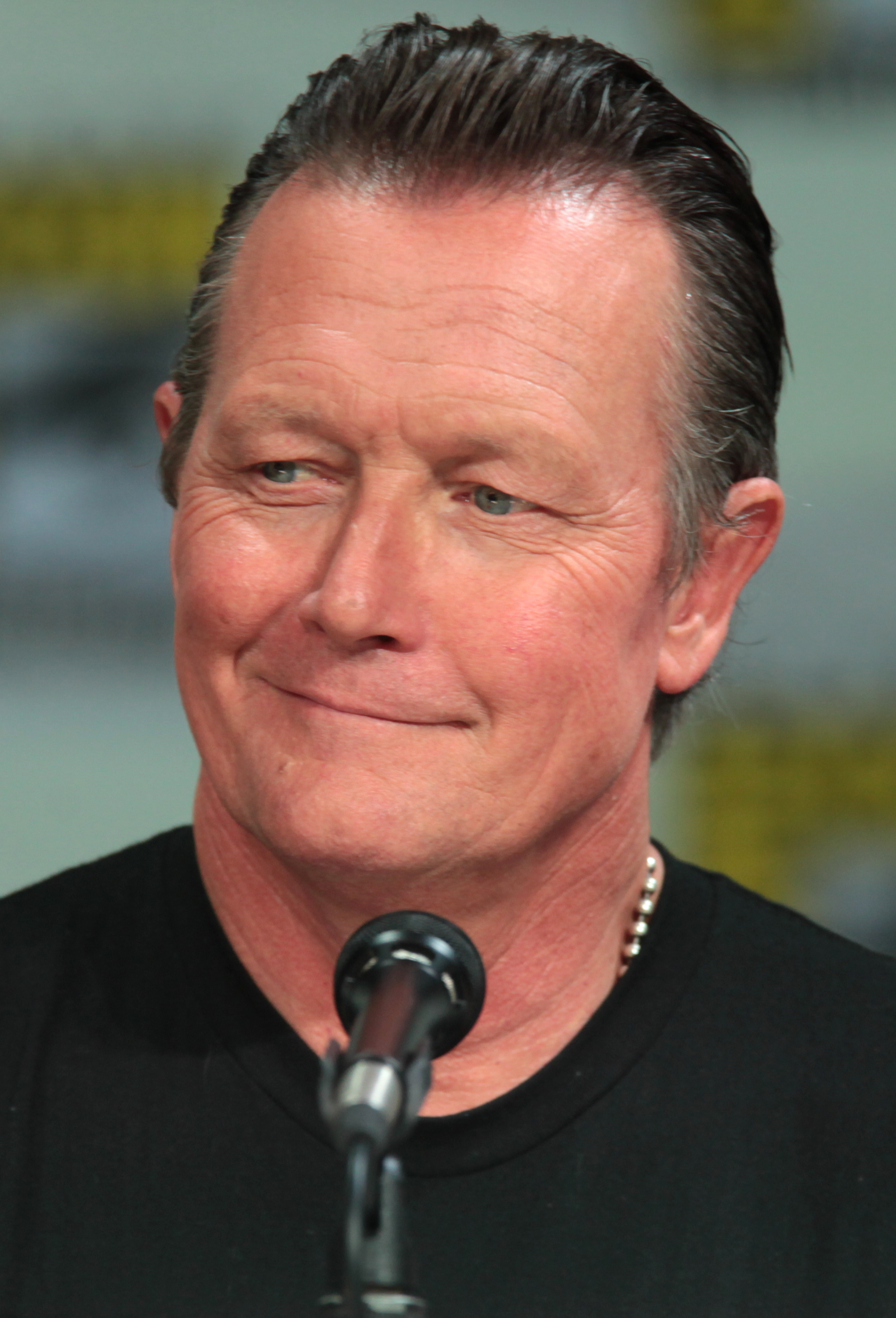
Robert Patrick recurred as Merton Bell.

Colonel Merton Bell (Robert Patrick) is a former Army tank unit commander and the President of First Defense PMC, the largest security and bounty hunting firm in the U.S. and the main antagonist of season seven.

He is hired by an Iraqi tribal leader to capture her daughter and granddaughter from Mike Franks's home in Mexico. Bell sends two of his men to accomplish the mission, but they are killed by Franks's daughter-in-law, Leyla Shakarji. Franks and his family run away to Gibbs's home in Washington, D.C., where they can be protected, but Bell finds out they are there and sends a squad to capture them.

With the help of Damon Werth, a former Marine under Bell's employ, Gibbs traps and arrests Bell before turning them over to Mexico for trial. (Bounty hunting is illegal in Mexico.) Bell is released with the help of American lawyer Margaret Allison Hart. He then sends Hart to Washington in a bid to have his revenge against Gibbs.

In "Patriot Down", Hart reveals to Vance that since he got out of prison, Bell had been gathering information on Gibbs and is responsible for uncovering evidence that almost twenty years earlier, Gibbs killed Pedro Hernandez, the drug dealer who murdered Gibbs's wife and daughter in 1991.

Bell orders his right-hand man, Jason Paul Dean, to kill Special Agent Lara Macy, who has discovered this evidence but subsequently buried it according to "Legend, Part 2". Bell and his men then set out for Mexico to murder Mike Franks and his family, but they are all killed by Dean who is revealed to be working for an unknown party.

Gibbs initially believes Bell's body is actually Franks, but Dean confesses to the murder, leaving the fate of Franks and his family unknown until "Rule Fifty-One". In the same episode, it is revealed that Bell was working for the Reynosa drug cartel. Paloma Reynosa, daughter of Pedro Hernandez and head of the cartel, plans to use Bell's vendetta against Gibbs to have her revenge for her father's death. She orders Dean to kill Bell as she no longer needs him.

=== Jeanne Benoit ===
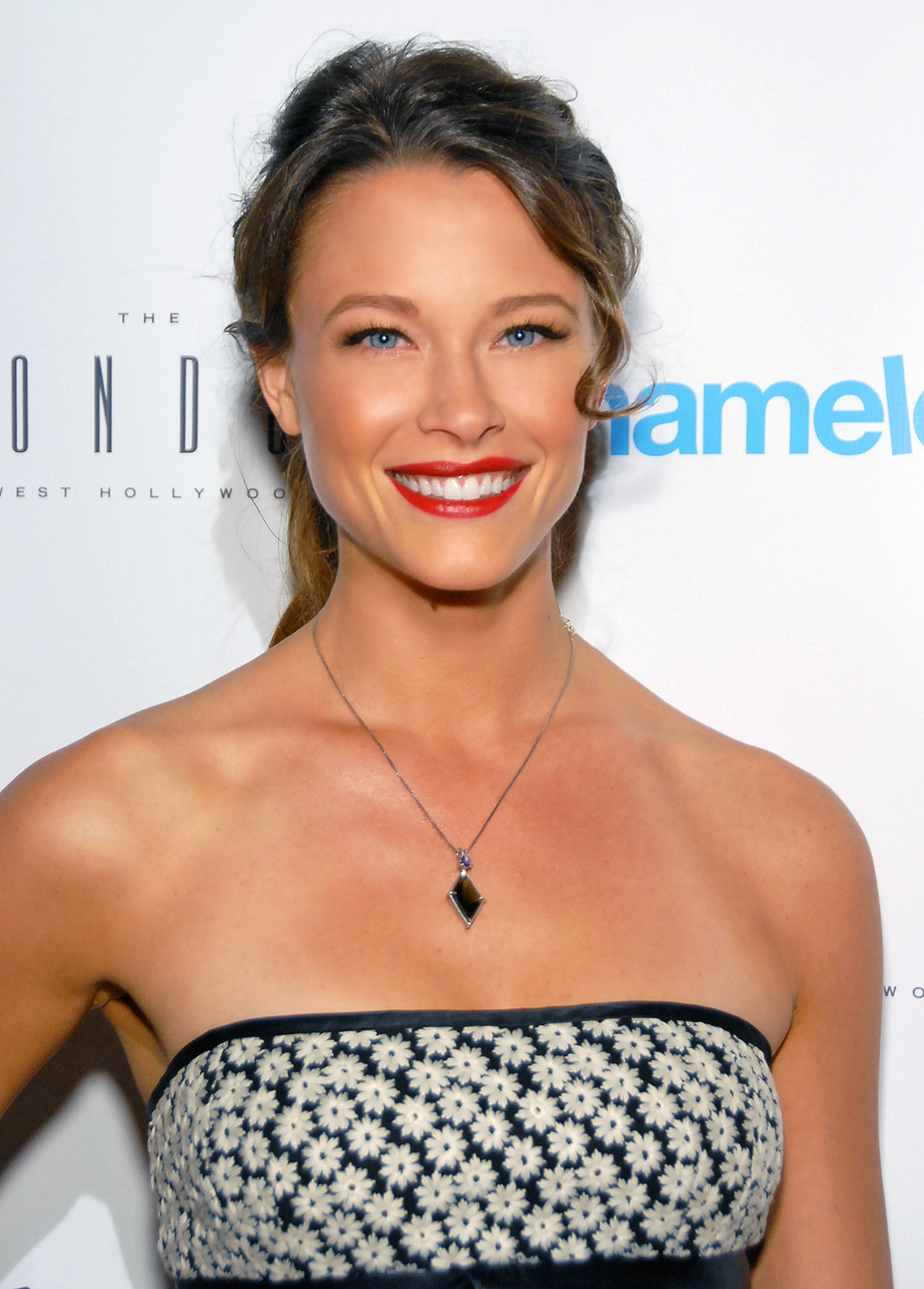
Scottie Thompson recurs as Jeanne Woods.

Jeanne Benoit (later Jeanne Woods; played by Scottie Thompson) first appears in the episode "Sandblast" as Tony DiNozzo's new girlfriend. She is an ER resident in Washington, D.C. In the episode "Angel of Death", it is revealed that she is the daughter of arms dealer René Benoit and that Director Shepard, during Gibbs' absence at the end of season 3, assigned Tony to an undercover mission to get close to Jeanne. After René is found dead, an FBI team led by Agent Tobias Fornell investigates Gibbs' team and interrogates Tony based on testimony from Jeanne that Tony killed her father. She later admits to Shepard that she lied out of anger at Tony for breaking her heart by lying about his identity and his intentions. She leaves the squad room after telling Tony (who did not lie about his feelings, despite his undercover deceptions) that she wished she had never met him.

In the episode "Bounce", she is mentioned as someone who could possibly have a grudge against Tony and be willing to frame him. Jeanne returns in the episode "Saviors" when NCIS investigate an attack on volunteer doctors in South Sudan. Two doctors go missing, one of whom is Jeanne's husband. She joins Tony and Tim on their mission, where Tony promises that they will not rest until they locate her husband. On their return flight, Jeanne thanks Tony and tells him that she owes him. He responds, "No, you don't... we're good”, leaving the pair to part amicably after eight years.

Months later, in "Loose Cannons", Tony encounters Jeanne and her husband while investigating a case; she worries about it being connected with her father, to which Tony assures her it is not. However, when NCIS finds out that the case is connected with her father, Jeanne accuses Tony of lying to her. He tries to apologize, as he did not know, but she says she was beginning to feel whole again until encountering him.

Later, after the case is closed, Tony returns to Jeanne's office to find her alone after a fight with her husband regarding her unresolved feelings for Tony. Tony fully apologizes to her and sits down with her, admitting he is not feeling whole either. They then have an amicable conversation about both of them wanting to go back in time to fix their relationship, in the hope of a happier ending. However, as they part, they both stand up and have a tense moment where they nearly kiss, but both agree it should not go any further.

=== René Benoit ===
René Benoit, alias La Grenouille ("The Frog") (Armand Assante) is a French arms dealer and the primary antagonist of seasons 4 and 5. He is always referred to by his sobriquet, an ethnic slur for the French. He is introduced in the episode "Singled Out", first appearing in "Blowback". Director Shepard has been obsessed with bringing him to justice for over ten years because she believes he killed her father and made it look like a suicide. Although he has connections to Iran, the CIA appears to tolerate him as a method of funneling disinformation to Iran as well as maintaining him as a prominent arms dealer so as to keep a degree of control over the arms trade.

According to a psychological profile by Dr. Mallard, even though La Grenouille is a "merchant of death", he is not a violent man by nature, a viewpoint Gibbs later embraces, as he too learns the fact that the arms dealer isn't really dangerous anyway. Director Shepard's investigation of La Grenouille almost ruins a CIA sting operation to get a faulty weapon system into Iranian hands. Subsequently, the CIA do their best to protect their asset.

In "Bury Your Dead", Benoit asks Director Shepard for protection, claiming someone is trying to kill him and take over his arms business, added to the fact that he no longer trusts the CIA. Shepard tells him "protect yourself" in true devotion to her father and hands him her gun, although it is later shown that he doesn't take it, as Gibbs is there in the same room to see what really happened that night. At the end of the episode, he is seen floating in the Washington Channel with a single gunshot to his head (from Director Shepard's gun).

In the episode "Angel of Death", it is revealed that La Grenouille is the father of Jeanne Benoit, the woman that DiNozzo seduces in the course of Director Shepard's undercover investigation, which Shepard later reveals in an apology to the young woman for "crossing the line" in "Internal Affairs". It is implied that both Trent Kort and NCIS Director Jenny Shepard kill him in the episode "Internal Affairs", and in "Judgment Day" (Part 1) Gibbs, reviewing the FBI file, finds evidence that further implicates her while looking at a familiarly marked bullet.

=== Abigail Borin ===
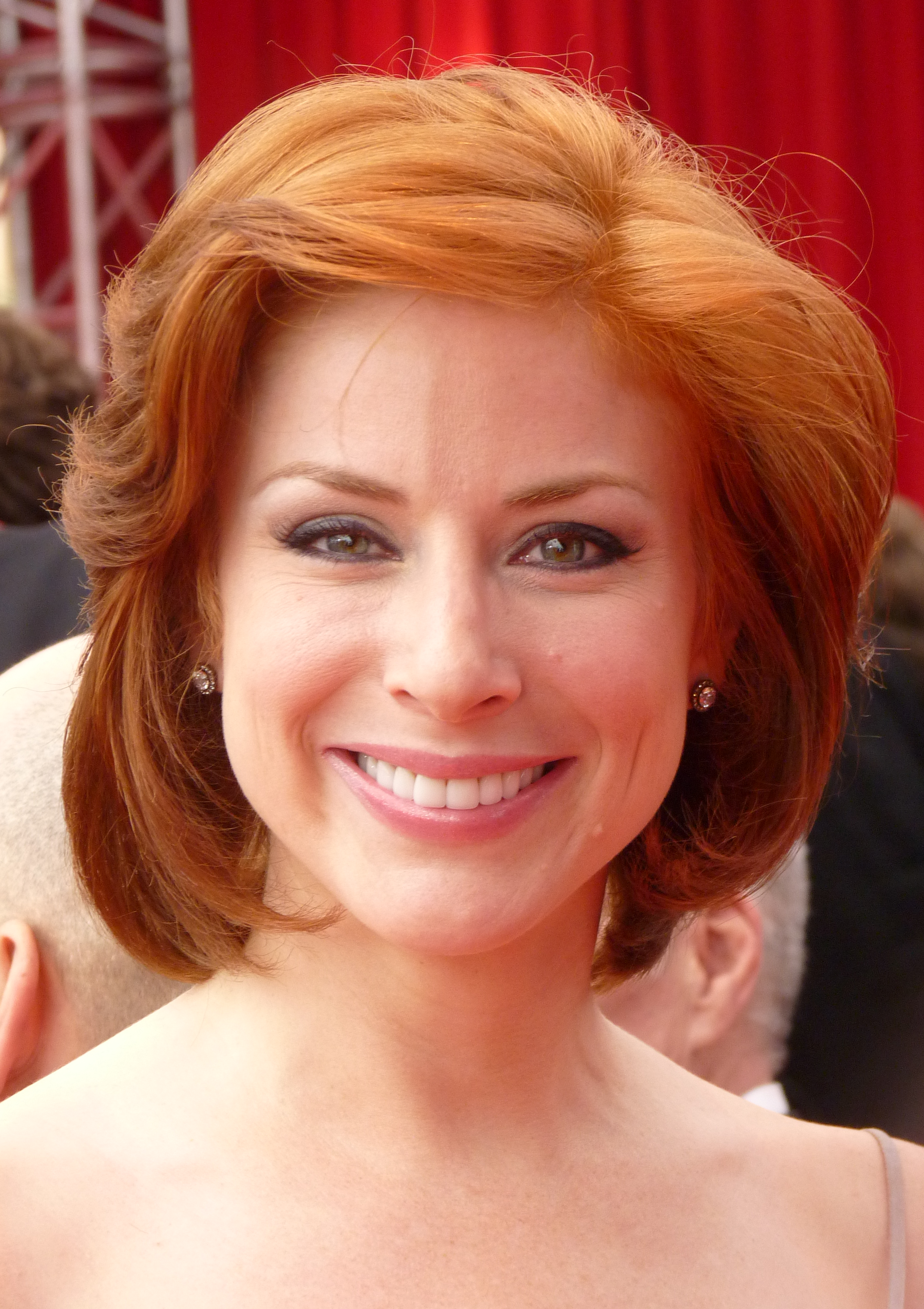
Diane Neal recurred as Special Agent Abigail Borin.

Supervisory Special Agent Abigail "Abby" Borin (Diane Neal) is a Coast Guard Investigative Service (CGIS) Special Agent. Originally from a small town in Ohio and an only child, Borin served a tour of duty in Iraq as a sergeant before presumably retiring from the Marines and joining CGIS where she later rose through the ranks, eventually getting the opportunity to lead her own team.

Her most recent appearance was in the season twelve episode, "The San Dominick". She is similar to Gibbs; both are coffee drinkers, liking it the same way, and workaholics with a strong sense of duty to their jobs. In "Safe Harbor", Tony attempts to matchmake the two of them, to no avail, although Borin continues to humor him by returning his wisecracks.

The character is also a recurring special guest on the spin-off NCIS: New Orleans, first appearing when she and Special Agent Dwayne Pride's team conduct a joint investigation. It is revealed that she took Advanced Placement Spanish at Chaminade-Julienne High School in Dayton, Ohio, and is fluent in the language. She previously worked with Pride on a joint undercover operation.

=== Stan Burley ===
Stan Burley (Joel Gretsch) is an NCIS agent who first appears in the first-season episode "High Seas". Prior to the series' start, he was Gibbs' partner and subordinate, but eventually was transferred out as an Agent Afloat, when he was replaced by DiNozzo. He looks up to Gibbs, and enlists his and his teams' help in tracking down a drug dealer on board the USS Enterprise. Burley knew (or at least knew of) Mike Franks, and calls Gibbs following his death to express his condolences.

Over eight years after his first appearance, Burley returns in the season nine episode "Playing with Fire", where he leads DiNozzo and David in tracking down and thwarting a terrorist who tries to destroy the carrier USS Benjamin Franklin in Naples, Italy, under the orders of businessman Harper Dearing. Burley is injured by the terrorist in the process. He returns with DiNozzo and David to the Navy Yard, and is part of the crowd which sees Gibbs place Dearing's photo on the wall of NCIS Most Wanted.

=== Maureen Cabot ===
Maureen Cabot (Kelli Williams) is an NCIS Special Agent assigned to the Family & Sexual Violence Program. Nicknamed "Mo", she assisted Gibbs in the episodes "Alleged" and "Viral".

=== Simon Cade ===
Special Agent Simon Cade (Matthew Willig) was an NCIS special agent on E. J. Barrett's team who appears in three episodes in season eight and the season nine premiere. Prior to being a NCIS agent, Cade attended Yale, where he played football. In the episode "Swan Song", he is wounded in a shootout with Jonas Cobb, but recovers. Following his recovery, he drops off the grid and is suspected of being a mole. Cade was shot and killed by Jonathan Cole in the season nine premiere "Nature of the Beast".

=== Paula Cassidy ===
Supervisory Special Agent Paula Cassidy (Jessica Steen) is a criminal profiler for NCIS, who first appears in the episode "Minimum Security". An expert on Middle Eastern terrorists, she works as an interrogator at Guantanamo Bay. During "Minimum Security", she is viewed with suspicion by Gibbs as the deceased victim in the episode had letters containing her name.

She develops a romantic relationship with DiNozzo and the two seemingly stay in contact, but she breaks it off at the end of "Heart Break" after hearing nothing from him (or possibly due to her anger at Gibbs giving her grief). Following the aftermath of Kate Todd's death, Cassidy temporarily joins Gibbs' team during "Mind Games" and helps in the case of a serial killer as well as tracking down a copycat who is carrying out similar killings.

After becoming a team leader and being assigned to the Pentagon, Cassidy's team is killed while investigating a suspected terrorist, and she later joins the team to find out who arranged the phone call and the trap that sent her team to their deaths. She also has a hostile relationship with Ziva David, pronouncing Ziva's surname wrong to antagonize her, a trait that Abby repeats upon meeting Ziva for the first time. It is later revealed that Ziva has been allowing herself to be the target of Cassidy's anger in order to help her through the ordeal of losing her team. As a result of the bombing, Cassidy is left with psychological scars and begins developing survivor's guilt, believing herself to be the one responsible for unknowingly sending her team into the trap. She later sacrifices herself to stop a suicide bomber in the episode "Grace Period", thus saving Gibbs, DiNozzo, Ziva, and three Muslim clerics, who were signing fatwās to promote peace in the Middle East. Her death leaves Tony grief-stricken and finally gives him the courage he needs to tell Jeanne that he loves her. Her portrait is later seen in a bar wall honoring officers who have been killed in the line of duty.

=== Rebecca Chase ===
Rebecca Chase (Jeri Ryan) is the second ex-wife of Leroy Jethro Gibbs. She first appears in "Check". She appears alongside Gibbs' first ex-wife Diane Sterling coincidentally at a crime scene he is investigating; she and Diane explain that they met at a support group. After a day of trying to avoid her, Rebecca then arrives at Gibbs' house, apologizing for cheating on him during their marriage.

Gibbs later interrogates her and her fiancé, who is revealed to be the man she cheated on Gibbs with; and later when it is revealed that her cell phone has been bugged, Gibbs discovers that Sergei Mishnev has been stalking her and has her and her fiancé put into the witness protection program. In the episode "Off The Grid", after Gibbs goes undercover, McGee and Torres discover that he and Rebecca had a phone conversation the night before. Torres calls Rebecca to find out if she knows any information about Gibbs' undercover operations; though she denies knowing anything and reveals that the two were only making plans for dinner; whether this is supposed to be romantic or not is left unknown.

=== Carrie Clark ===
Carrie Clark (Salli Richardson-Whitfield) is a lawyer and a former Special Agent with the FBI. She worked on FBI Special Agent Tobias Fornell's team, and is now a criminal attorney. She first appears in season 11, episode 8 ("Alibi"), followed by season 12, episode 8 ("Semper Fortis"), and season 13, episode 9 (“A Day in Court"). She has worked with Gibbs and his team on a case, while working for the FBI (off screen).

In “Alibi”, after Marine Staff Sergeant Justin Dunne is arrested on hit-and-run charges, he requests an attorney, and hires former FBI agent Carrie Clark, who also happens to be an old acquaintance of the team. Dunne tells Carrie that he has an alibi, in that he was involved in a murder outside of the base at the time of the hit-and-run, and that somebody else must have stolen his truck. Due to attorney-client privilege, Carrie cannot tell Gibbs and the team anything about Dunne's crime other than he has a solid alibi. However, she manages to leave small, subtle clues for the team to follow.

=== Jonas Cobb ===
Lieutenant Jonas Cobb (Kerr Smith) is the real name of the "Port-to-Port Killer", or 'P2P' for short, the primary antagonist of season eight. Originally recruited into a CIA assassination team code-named Frankenstein, Cobb cracked under intense and inhumane training before escaping.

He re-surfaced in Rota, Spain, where he began his pattern of killing Navy personnel when they made landfall. He has also killed victims in Guam, Japan, Norfolk, Washington, D.C., and was in the process of killing another victim in Hawaii before being interrupted by CIA operative Trent Kort.

A ruthless serial killer, he is responsible for the deaths of Mike Franks and NCIS Agent Gayne Levin, and takes NCIS agent E.J. Barrett hostage. One body in the episode "Baltimore" resembles P2P's work, but is later found by Dr. Mallard to be a copycat because of the way the knot is tied. The killer is revealed to be Agent DiNozzo's former superior at Baltimore PD, and the victim is DiNozzo's former partner there, with whom he reconciled. The real P2P, though not known to be Cobb at the time, makes the deception final through a fake Abby Scuito email.

Cobb's modus operandi involves luring his victims into a trap before slashing their throats from behind. He then scrubs the body down with a hospital-grade cleanser before wrapping the bodies in plastic and dumping them in isolated areas. He has been known to dress seamen in the uniforms of officers, and often leaves personal effects of his victims behind frozen in ice that foreshadow his next kill, though his m.o. changes forever in "Swan Song".

Psychological profiling of Cobb depicts him as methodical, intelligent, and opposed to authority, but not easily distracted by law enforcement. The threat posed by Cobb is deemed so great by Director Vance, that he deliberately changes NCIS policy to antagonize Gibbs in the hopes of setting Gibbs up as a figure Cobb will identify with, in an attempt to lure Cobb into a trap. Cobb, after abducting Ziva David, gives himself up to NCIS in order to start the next phase of his plan. While Gibbs interrogates him with Agent Barrett watching, he tells a story about the son of a Marine who was told that he had to have his horse put to sleep, which turns out to be a deadly seed planted into Cobb as a child, since the story was about him anyway.

Cobb is killed in the season eight finale, "Pyramid", where it is revealed that everything he had done since his first kill in Rota has been a part of a larger plan to get revenge on those he holds responsible for Operation Frankenstein—Leon Vance, Trent Kort and the Secretary of the Navy. He is aware that what he does is evil, but maintains that his actions have been for the greater good. He is shot and killed by Gibbs and Vance when he refuses to surrender.

=== Jonathan Cole ===
Jonathan Cole (Scott Wolf), alias FBI Agent Casey Stratton, is one of the primary antagonists of season nine. He was formerly a member of "Phantom Eight", a clandestine team of operatives assigned to the Watcher Fleet tasked with protecting the United States Navy. Cole goes rogue some time after the Phantom Eight are disbanded and begins working with Sean Latham, the corrupt Director of Special Operations for the Office of Naval Intelligence and a former member of Phantom Eight himself. Cole and Latham conspire to sell a series of microchips belonging to Phantom Eight members, which give their owners unrivalled access to the Navy mainframe. Cole makes his first appearance in "Nature of the Beast", where he adopts the alias of Casey Stratton, an FBI Agent assigned to investigate a shooting involving Tony DiNozzo. DiNozzo, having forgotten the events that led up to the trauma of the shooting, attempts to reconstruct his memories, recounting his investigation of NCIS Agents Simon Cade and E.J. Barrett. His investigation centers on a microchip Barrett extracted from the body of Gayne Levin, who also served in Phantom Eight, but wound up the last murder victim of Lt. Jonas Cobb, the Port-to-Port Killer. Cole manipulates DiNozzo, Barrett, and Cade into first distrusting one another and then meeting, where he attempts to kill all three before fleeing with the microchip. Cole kills Cade, wounds DiNozzo, and misses Barrett, who flees. He later approaches DiNozzo in the hospital under the Casey Stratton alias, but is unable to kill him as DiNozzo is under guard. Cole reappears in "Housekeeping", where he attempts to kill E.J. Barrett, who has since resurfaced. After the first failed attempt, Latham advises Cole to abandon his mission, but Cole refuses, claiming that he has to see it through, and he murders Latham. Now aware of his role in Phantom Eight and his actual name, NCIS trick Cole into attacking a safehouse under the pretense that Barrett and DiNozzo are hiding there. The safehouse is empty, and Cole is apprehended. His final appearance comes in "Till Death Do Us Part" when Gibbs feels he would be an ideal operative to get close to the terrorist Harper Dearing. Cole agrees in exchange for a (slightly) reduced sentence, but Dearing is already aware of his role and rejects his offer of help. Cole is killed when attempting to defuse a bomb left by Dearing outside NCIS headquarters. Although Cole never offers a reason for his crimes, and the circumstances that led to his becoming a traitor are never detailed, he does admit that he thought he had good reasons for doing what he did; he was soon proven wrong.

=== Grace Confalone ===
Dr. Grace Confalone (Laura San Giacomo) is the therapist of both Gibbs and Dr. Cyril Taft. First appearing in "Loose Cannons", Grace builds a professional relationship and personal friendship with Gibbs, nicknaming him "Popeye", and often resorting to child psychology (including picture charts) to tap into his psyche. In "Family First", Grace befriends Tobias Fornell's daughter Emily at the request of Gibbs while Fornell is in a coma after having been shot. Grace returns in "Privileged Information", as Gibbs investigates a patient of hers, a Marine Sergeant, after she ends up in a coma, and tells Gibbs he should treat it as a murder investigation, but cannot divulge further due to doctor-patient confidentiality. When the patient dies, Grace tells Gibbs that the patient was involved in covering up a murder, but that she didn't tell her any details. In "Twofer", following Gibbs' and McGee's return to the US after a failed mission in Paraguay, Grace is appointed to conduct psychiatric evaluations on them to determine whether they are fit to return to NCIS. Gibbs surprisingly is able to open up to her about his troubles more than she's already known, but McGee skips his appointment with her, frustrating her. Gibbs is able to convince McGee to go to his appointment with Grace, and meets with McGee outside her office after the session, having himself become a more regular patient of Grace. In "Two Steps Back", Grace is seen playing a poker game at Gibbs' house with Gibbs, Vance, Fornell and new NCIS agent Jack Sloane, whom she meets for the first time.

=== Jerome Craig ===
Jerome Craig (Greg Germann) is the deputy director of the Naval Criminal Investigative Service. Craig is promoted to acting director following the drive-by shooting of Jackie Vance. It is in this capacity that he helps investigate Ajay Khan ("Canary"), though he later steps down from his position in "Hereafter". Craig is a bureaucrat, with little-to-no field experience.

=== Rachel Cranston ===
Dr. Rachel Cranston (née Todd) (Wendy Makkena) is a psychologist and the older sister of Caitlin Todd. She has made four appearances to date, the first being in the season eight episode "A Man Walks Into a Bar...". Tony gives her the nickname "Dr. Kate's Sister". In the season nine premiere "Nature of the Beast", she helps the team piece together the events of Tony's undercover assignment. Her most recent appearance is in the season eleven "Double Back", when she psychologically evaluates McGee after a bombing leaves his girlfriend Delilah paralyzed.

=== Phillip Davenport ===
The former United States Secretary of the Navy, Phillip Davenport (Jude Ciccolella) presumably took over from Edward Sheffield (Dean Stockwell), who was last seen in the position during the final season of JAG and the second season of NCIS. He was in office from at least 2008 (during which he made his first appearance) until he resigned in 2011 during the events of "Pyramid".

=== Eli David ===
Eli David (played by Michael Nouri, and by Ben Morrison as a younger David in flashbacks) has a recurring role, starting in "Last Man Standing", as the head of Mossad. Earlier in the series, it is also mentioned that he is Ziva David's father, as well as that of her half-brother, Ari Haswari, a sort of mercenary/terrorist whom she prevents from shooting Agent Gibbs. David also had a younger daughter, Tali, Ziva's full sister, who is also deceased. Though appearing to be "all business" and uncaring about his children, Eli's reasons for this come from the need to preserve the existence of Israel, a country surrounded by enemy nations. He and Director Vance have shared a history since a time in Amsterdam when Eli saved his life from the attempts of a Russian hit squad.

Towards the end of season six, Eli sends Michael Rivkin to Washington in what Vance describes as a not-so-subtle message that he does not think NCIS are doing their jobs. During "Semper Fidelis", Eli is suspected of using Michael Rivkin to spy on the Americans and using the intelligence to locate a terrorist handler and find a training camp located in Somalia. Vance claims that Eli ordered Ziva to kill Ari and gain Gibbs' trust. In "Aliyah", when Ziva, Gibbs, Vance, and Tony travel to Israel, David accuses Tony of killing Michael Rivkin out of jealousy; Tony, in turn, accuses him of sending every corrupt Mossad officer to Washington for NCIS to handle. Later, David demands that Ziva return full-time to Mossad and complete Rivkin's assignment. Ziva thus travels covertly into a Somali terrorist camp to eliminate Saleem Ulman, its leader. After one member of the team is killed and the other two are wounded, their instructions stand, and this leads directly to Ziva's captivity and torture at Saleem's hands. Afterward, during the episode "Good Cop, Bad Cop", Eli sends Mossad operative Malachi Ben-Gidon to Washington to discredit Ziva and her account of events that led to her capture prior to "Truth or Consequences", which prompts her to believe that her father is corrupt: an opinion disproven during the events of "Enemies Foreign"/"Enemies Domestic" (season eight), wherein Ziva manages to reconcile with her father after understanding his reasoning, and concluding that she wants to live her life on her own terms instead of her father's. In the 11th episode of Season 10, "Shabbat Shalom", Director David comes to the U.S. without any type of protection in hopes of making peace not only with Ziva, but also with Iran via their Intelligence Bureau's Head, David's childhood friend Arash Kazmi (Nasser Faris). Unfortunately, both he and Jackie, Director Vance's wife, are shot and killed in the Vance home during dinner in a drive-by shooting orchestrated by hawkish anti-peace Mossad personnel headed by Deputy Director Ilan Tohar Bodnar (Oded Fehr). The last we see of Director David is Ziva holding his body while sobbing and praying in her native Hebrew. As it turns out, Kazmi was also assassinated that night, an action blamed on the fugitive Bodner, but really undertaken by the CIA in an effort to "stir the (political) pot" in Middle East affairs involving Israel and Iran (see season 10, episode 24, "Damned If You Do)".

=== Harper Dearing ===
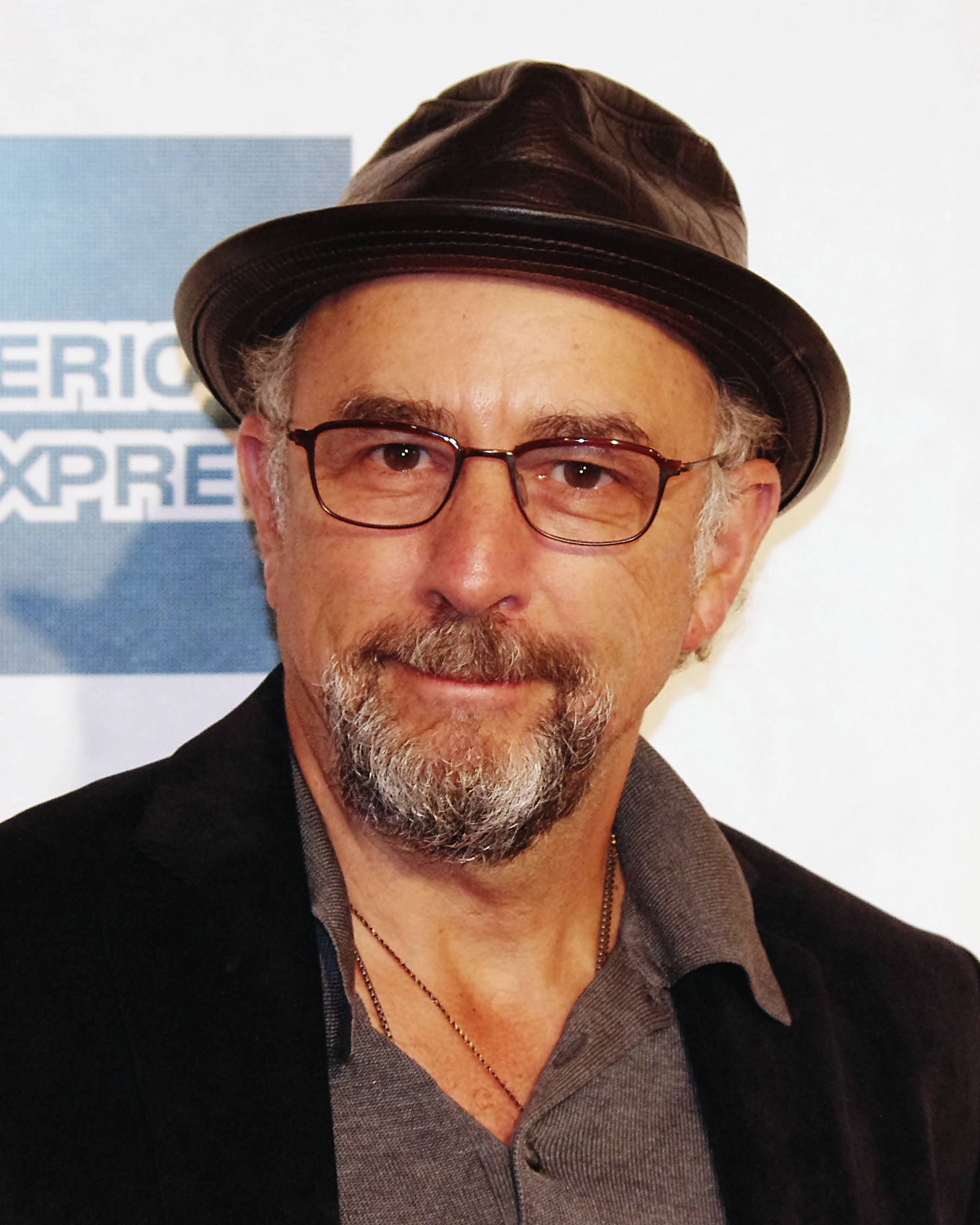
Richard Schiff played Harper Dearing.

Harper Dearing (Richard Schiff) is the primary antagonist during the last episodes of the ninth season. Initially described as "an eccentric businessman whose son was killed in a terrorist bombing", he appears as a domestic terrorist, out for revenge against the Navy due to the death of his son, Evan, which is revealed in "Up in Smoke". Dr. Samatha Ryan describes Dearing as "a sociopathic, paranoid narcissist". After a series of attacks on Navy ships where his hired arsonist Andre Fullerton was apprehended in "Playing with Fire", Dearing now knows that NCIS is onto him after Fullerton was forced to divulge the identity of the man who hired him. With NCIS onto him, Dearing plants a bomb at the NCIS Headquarters in the season finale, "Till Death Do Us Part". The resulting cliffhanger leaves most of the main characters' fates unclear. These events spur Gibbs to seek personal revenge against Dearing, culminating in a confrontation in which Gibbs fatally stabs Dearing in self-defense.

=== Anthony DiNozzo, Sr. ===
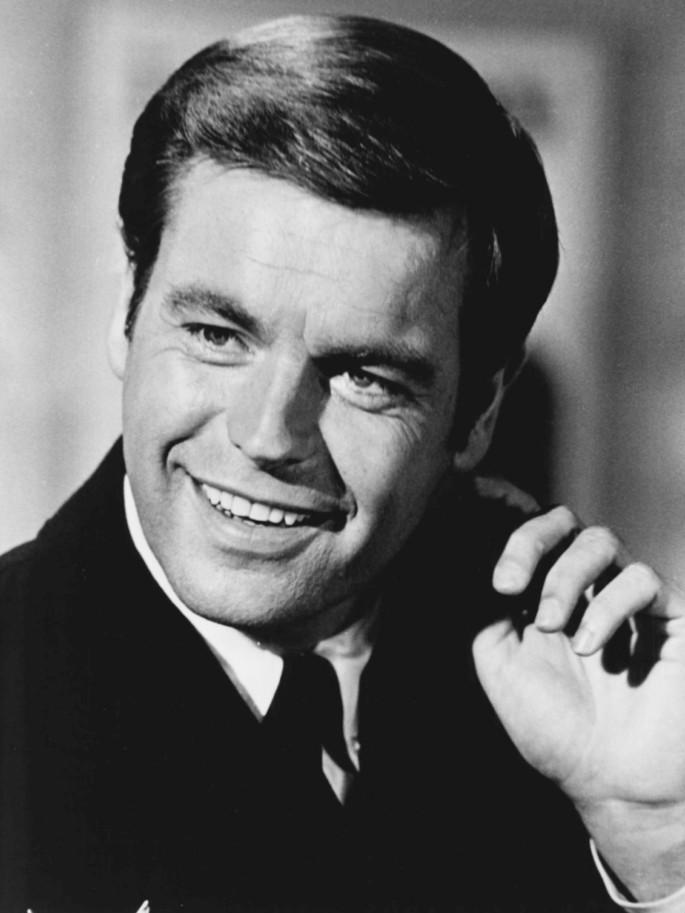
Robert Wagner plays Anthony DiNozzo Sr.

Anthony DiNozzo Sr. (Robert Wagner) is the father of Tony DiNozzo. They typically refer to each other as "Junior" and "Senior". They are estranged in the early seasons of the show, but Tony makes it clear that his father has money. When Senior first appears in the season 7 episode Flesh and Blood, Tony realizes that, although still living large, Senior is using his considerable charm to schmooze rich friends into paying his expenses, and is actually broke. Tony concludes that his father has just been a con man all those years. When Senior finally hears about this in the season 12 episode The Artful Dodger, he denies the accusation: he says he is an entrepreneur, the difference being that he has always believed in the dreams he was selling. Over time, the two attempt to rebuild their relationship.

=== Ned Dorneget ===
Special Agent Ned Dorneget (Matt L. Jones) is a probationary agent first introduced in the Season 9 episode "Sins of the Father". Usually known as "Dorney" to the rest of the team, he is often assigned to the evidence locker against his wishes and desires to become a full field agent. In "Need to Know", Gibbs decides that he is ready and hands him his first field assignment. Like McGee during his days as a probie, Dorneget is often the butt of Tony's hazing pranks in Season 10, most notably in the episode "Prime Suspect". The character does not return for Season 11 but is briefly mentioned in the Season 12 episode "The San Dominick", when he calls McGee for updates regarding Gibbs and the hostage situation. Later in Season 12, Dorneget returns in the episode "Troll", where it is revealed that he has become a full-fledged NCIS Special Agent and that he also works for NCIS Cyber Operations. In the next episode, "The Lost Boys", Dorneget is killed in Cairo in a terrorist bomb attack after saving dozens of people at a hotel. His mother, CIA officer Joanna Teague (Mimi Rogers), works with NCIS to find the terrorist group responsible for his death.

=== Chad Dunham ===
Special Agent Chad Dunham (Todd Lowe) first appears in the episode "Truth or Consequences". Chad Dunham is a recurring NCIS Special Agent who was stationed in the Horn of Africa when Ziva was being held captive by a group of terrorists in the beginning of season seven. He returned in episode four, "Good Cop, Bad Cop". His third appearance (and the last to date) is in season seven, episode seven, "Endgame", although this time it was in person in DC, when Ziva notices that he "cleans up nice".

=== Orli Elbaz ===
Orli Elbaz (Marina Sirtis) is the Director of Mossad, protégée of Eli David, and a close friend to Ziva. In the distant past, prior to her appointment to Mossad, Orli had an affair with Eli David that led to the dissolution of his marriage to Rivka David. In the aftermath of Eli's murder, with Ilan Bodnar going on the run until killed in a fight with Special Agent Ziva David, Orli becomes the new director of Mossad. Though she and Ziva are initially resentful of one another, they reconcile in the season following Ziva's departure from NCIS — and Elbaz is one of the only people she confides in about the paternity of Tali. Orli is last seen transporting the child to NCIS, and relinquishing custody to DiNozzo.

=== Adam Eshel ===
Adam Eshel (Damon Dayoub) works for Shin Bet, Israel's internal security and counterintelligence service, and is also Ziva David's contact. During Eshel's first appearance, he assists in the investigation into Ilan Bodnar, working with Tony and Ziva. In "Whiskey Tango Foxtrot", Eshel lends his expertise in order to give DiNozzo an insight into Ziva's personal life and current whereabouts. He is mentioned in "Family First", with DiNozzo stating he has asked Eshel about Ziva's current location, but that Adam says he has not had contact with her in over a year. In Season 17, it is revealed that, after Ziva has escaped the mortar attack, she brought Tali to Adam who then brings the child to Orli. Eshel returns in the NCIS Season 17 episode, "The North Pole" where he was captured by henchmen working for terrorist Sahar who has been hunting Ziva and tortured Adam. Despite Gibbs and Ziva's efforts, they arrive too late to save Eshel who ultimately succumbs to his injuries and dies although Eshel tells them that the real Sahar they've been looking for is someone they know before dying, leading the two to realize that the real Sahar is Gibbs's neighbor, Sarah.

=== Delilah Fielding-McGee ===
Delilah Fielding-McGee (Margo Harshman) is a Department of Defense analyst and McGee's girlfriend and later his wife. An agent with the Department of Defense, Delilah is first mentioned during the Season 10 finale "Damned If You Do" as a woman McGee has been flirting with who sends him some confidential information relating to a case. She first appears in the Season 11 premiere episode, "Whiskey Tango Foxtrot", during a coffee date with McGee and later becomes an ally, assisting the NCIS team in their hunt for terrorist Benham Parsa. In the Season 11 episodes "Kill Chain" and "Double Back", Delilah is left badly injured in a missile attack at a black-tie event she and McGee are attending. While McGee is not seriously injured, Delilah is left permanently paralyzed due to shrapnel embedded in her spine, and she thereafter uses a wheelchair. She soon recovers from the incident and continues to assist the NCIS team. In the episode "Page Not Found", McGee confides in Tony that he is planning to ask Delilah to move in with him; Delilah later reveals to Tony that she wants to take a job opening for a senior intelligence analyst, which would require her to move to Dubai for a year. Tony then separately tells the two about their other half's plans; McGee allows her to take the job, and they agree to continue their relationship long-distance. McGee also gives her a copy of his house key, which she accepts, reiterating her intent to move in with him after her assignment is over.

After spending almost a year in Dubai, Delilah returns in the episode "Status Update". When she returns as team leader now based in the US, she and McGee move in together. McGee later buys an engagement ring, with the intent of proposing to Delilah. When McGee spontaneously proposes to Delilah in the elevator in the episode "Love Boat", she accepts. During "Something Blue", McGee and Delilah have been planning their wedding when Delilah collapses. While she recovers in the hospital, she and McGee find out that she is pregnant. They change their minds about wedding planning and marry in a private ceremony in their apartment surrounded by the NCIS team. In the episode "Ready or Not", Delilah goes into labor and Abby takes her to the hospital. A hostage situation occurs in the hospital and McGee is caught up in it while Delilah gives birth to twins, John (a boy), named after McGee's father Admiral John McGee, and Morgan (a girl), named after ER guard (and former law enforcement officer) Morgan Cade, who was fatally shot trying to help McGee arrest an arms dealer. McGee is unharmed and eventually is able to be with Delilah when she gives birth.

=== Jenna Flemming ===
Jenna Flemming (Mary Stuart Masterson) is a Congresswoman in the United States House of Representatives, representing Maryland's 9th district. Her political career started when she was elected to the School Board; she has been a member of the House since 2001. Since "A Many Splendored Thing", Congresswoman Flemming is the ranking member of the House Counterterrorism Subcommittee. She was a descendant of Attila the Hun.

Congresswoman Flemming starts a romantic relationship with Director Vance after his team investigates death threats against her and the death of her aide. She is interested in grooming Vance for a political career, and even offered to help Gibbs become the new Director of NCIS should Vance leave. When Flemming and Vance come to blows over their different views of politics, the two agree that they are not good at not letting these differences interfere with their relationship and decide to take a break from it to figure things out.

=== Stephanie Flynn ===
Stephanie Bronwyn Flynn (Kathleen York) is Gibbs' third ex-wife. She first appears in "Ex-File".

=== Emily Fornell ===
Emily Fornell (Juliette Angelo) was the daughter of Agent Tobias Fornell and Diane Sterling. Emily first appears during season four, played by Payton Spencer. During season eleven, "Devil's Triad", Emily is kidnapped and subsequently rescued by NSA Analyst Eleanor Bishop, while in season twelve she is visibly distraught following her mother's death. In "Cabin Fever", she enlists Gibbs' assistance when Tobias is arrested for DUI. She later appears in person in the episode "Dead Letter", where she quickly learns about her father being critically wounded by an unknown assassin. Out of anger and grief (especially as it happens just a year after her mother has been murdered), she demands that Gibbs swear to her to find the one who did this and make him pay. She later calls Gibbs requesting his help, as the nurse at the hospital refuses to resuscitate Fornell due to a "do not resuscitate" clause he had written when he was still grieving for her mom's death. While waiting for him to wake up, she attempts to paint his toenails to look like watermelons, but then she notices he is waking up and tries to talk to him. He is only awake for a few moments, but he tells her to tell Gibbs some vital information relating to SISCO regarding stolen cell-phones. This information allows them to track down Jacob Scott (whom they had believed was the man who murdered Terdei and left Fornell under critical condition at the time) who, much to everyone's surprise, has surrendered to NCIS custody at the Navy Yard. In "Family First", she is still waiting for her dad's recovery. During this time, she also runs out of nail-polish, thus leaving her pedicure on her dad incomplete. In addition, Gibbs, under the pretense of helping to catch the man who tried to kill Tobias (although it is heavily implied that it is actually to help Emily come to terms with what might happen), brings his shrink, Dr. Grace Confalone, who also proceeds to help her with the project. She affectionately calls Gibbs "Uncle Gibbs". She dies of a drug overdose in the Season 18 episode "Winter Chill".

=== Tobias Fornell ===
Senior FBI Special Agent Tobias C. Fornell (Joe Spano), later a private investigator, first appears in the series premiere episode "Yankee White". He is often involved in "inter-agency turf wars" with Gibbs' NCIS team. The two frequently pretend to be furiously angry at each other in front of their agents, while privately they are on friendly terms. When their teams have to share jurisdiction on a case, Gibbs usually asks for operational control; in exchange, credit for successes is claimed by Fornell's team. Their friendship is close enough for Gibbs to delay his retirement in the episode "Escaped" to assist Fornell in recapturing a fugitive. In the episode "The Bone Yard", Fornell comes to Gibbs for help when he is accused of being a mole for the mafia. In the same episode, he reveals that Gibbs is likely his only friend. Gibbs seems to feel similarly about Fornell, going so far as to fake Fornell's death to further the investigation to clear him of guilt. It is revealed in the episode "Twilight", that Fornell was married to Gibbs' second wife (Diane) after she and Gibbs divorced, something that Gibbs warned him against. Fornell often refers to Diane as "our ex-wife" to Gibbs. Fornell and Diane have a daughter, Emily. After a period of estrangement, the two reunite and agree to marry. Diane is later murdered, and Fornell turns to alcoholism for a short time.

After being shot by an unknown assailant (later revealed to be Trent Kort) in "Homefront", Fornell spends the next few months convalescing on Gibbs' couch, before finally returning to his own place around Christmas.

In season 15, Gibbs discovers that Fornell had falsified evidence to get Gabriel Hicks convicted as a serial killer and is forced to testify against him. Fornell is fired from the FBI and becomes a private investigator; this causes a temporary break in their friendship. They make up when Hicks is eventually found to indeed be guilty and is arrested, exonerating Fornell. Despite being offered back a position in the FBI, Fornell chooses to stay in his new career.

Fornell is the only recurring character to appear in every season, except season 17 due to COVID-19 shutting down production early, season 22 and 23, of NCIS.

=== Michael "Mike" Franks ===
Special Agent-in-Charge Michael Aaron Franks, NIS/NCIS (Ret.) (Muse Watson) is introduced in episode flashbacks in the episode "Hiatus" (Part 1). He is Gibbs' former boss, mentor and partner, still referring to Gibbs as "Probie", just as DiNozzo does with McGee. In "Hiatus" (Part 2), it is stated that he retired to Mexico in 1996, roughly five years after Gibbs joined NIS/NCIS, after becoming outraged with the government's failure to prevent the Khobar Towers bombing. He comes across as callous and uncaring, keeping his feelings and his personal life tightly under wraps, even hiding the fact that he had a grown son until he needed Gibbs' help to protect his granddaughter and the girl's mother, Leyla, after his son is killed. Gibbs has picked up many of his traits, including the trademark head slap he gives to DiNozzo, and his ability to find a way around red tape. NCIS Director Jenny Shepard brings him back in hopes of helping Gibbs regain his memory after suffering a concussion in part 2 of "Hiatus". Franks is the only survivor of the gun battle that ends Director Shepard's life, and is the last living person to know about her incurable illness during her lifetime, as Gibbs only has suspicions at the time of "Judgment Day" (Part 1). In his visit to Gibbs' bedside in season three, it is revealed in flashbacks that he warned members of the intelligence community about the threat that Osama bin Laden posed to American servicemen abroad some time before the Khobar Towers bombing. After the deaths of a number of Air Force personnel in the bombing, Franks retired to Mexico and handed control of the MCRT to Gibbs.

In season seven, Franks is seemingly ambushed by Colonel Merton Bell's henchmen and hitmen from the Reynosa drug cartel. His fate is left ambiguous and whether he is killed or captured in the attack is unknown until he reappears to assist DiNozzo in investigating Alejandro. As a result of the gunfight between Bell and the Reynosa Cartel's men, Franks loses his right index finger. In the beginning of season eight, in the episode "Spider and the Fly", he appears after four months, showing up at Gibbs' house to help him, the team, Vance, and Jackson Gibbs destroy Paloma and Alejandro once and for all. Franks is killed by Jonas Cobb, the "Port-to-Port Killer", outside of Gibbs' house in the season-eight episode "Swan Song" as he attempts to apprehend Cobb. Franks, a Marine veteran like Gibbs, is given a full military burial at the end of the season-eight finale. It was also revealed in this episode that Franks was dying of cancer and Gibbs was making him a coffin. In the episode "Newborn King", Leyla and her daughter are revealed to have moved to Washington, D.C., following Franks' death. In "Outlaws and In-Laws", Gibbs is stated to be godfather to Leyla's daughter Amira. In "Anonymous Was a Woman" Franks is shown (in flashback) as having conducted a rescue program for Afghan women. Mike continues to appear, or to be heard, as a figment of Gibbs' imagination, throughout the succeeding several seasons.

Franks is a main character in the prequel series NCIS: Origins, and is portrayed by Kyle Schmid.

=== Jackson Gibbs ===
Jackson Gibbs (Ralph Waite) is the father of Leroy Jethro Gibbs. After his son left to join the Marines, Jackson Gibbs continued to live in the town of Stillwater, Pennsylvania. He was widowed some years before the events in the season six episode "Heartland". In "Heartland", it is revealed that Jackson and his son are estranged, but in later appearances, they reconcile and become close. Gibbs also starts to call his father "Dad" instead of "Jack". It is eventually revealed that Gibbs' resentment for his father came from the difficult relationship between his parents. Gibbs' mother, Ann, was a hard woman to live with and they mutually had affairs despite their strong feelings for one another. Gibbs blamed his father's affairs for his mother leaving. The only thing that kept Gibbs and his father in contact after that was Gibbs' wife, Shannon and his granddaughter Kelly.

During the episode "Frame Up", Gibbs mentions that his father painted pin-up girl Betty Grable on the nose of his P-51 Mustang. Jackson served as a pilot in the United States Army Air Forces during World War II. Disoriented once while returning from a mission, Jackson was saved by an enemy German pilot. The pilots' reunion is the subject of the eleventh season's episode Better Angels. In the season seven finale, "Rule Fifty-One", Paloma Reynosa of the Reynosa cartel enters Gibbs' store and turns the sign on the door from open to closed. This is following Reynosa's warning to Gibbs that if he does not do exactly as she says she will kill everyone he ever met and is all part of Paloma's plan to get revenge on Gibbs who killed her father twenty years previously. However, in the season eight opening, "Spider and the Fly", it is revealed that Gibbs managed to warn his father about the approaching danger just in time and Jackson is able to fight back against Paloma's men and escape before they could manage to kill him. The two went into hiding until Paloma was killed.

In "The Namesake", it is revealed that Jackson named his son after LJ — Leroy Jethro Moore (Billy Dee Williams). According to Jethro, it was LJ who inspired him to join the Marine Corps as a teenager. LJ revealed to Gibbs that he, Jackson and the latter's wife Ann were friends growing up and both men fell in love with Ann. Due to segregation, Jackson married Ann as LJ was African-American and an inter-racial marriage was a social taboo during that time. The strained relationship between Gibbs and Jackson starts to mend after they bond during the case and they get an insight into what the other is feeling. Gibbs finally starts to forgive his father when he learns that he has finished restoring the car that had been Gibbs' only dream during his teenage years. Jackson later tells Gibbs to take the car and they promise to keep in touch. In the season 11 finale, "Honor Thy Father" (which aired exactly three months after Waite's death in February 2014), Vance tells Gibbs that Jackson suffered a fatal stroke. Jackson is buried with full military honors, with the USAF honor guards presenting Gibbs with Old Glory from Jackson's casket and performing Taps. LJ and Gibbs' team are present at the funeral.

Jackson also appears in the prequel series NCIS: Origins, played by Robert Taylor.

=== Kelly Gibbs ===
Kelly Gibbs is the daughter of Leroy Jethro Gibbs and his first wife, Shannon. Both Shannon and Kelly were killed in a car wreck caused by Mexican drug dealer Pedro Hernandez in Oceanside, California, while Gibbs was deployed during Desert Storm. She first appears in a brief flashback, identified in the credits only as "Gibbs' daughter", in "Honor Code".

=== Shannon Gibbs ===
Shannon Gibbs (née Fielding) (Darby Stanchfield) is the late wife of Leroy Jethro Gibbs and the mother of his daughter, Kelly. Both Shannon and Kelly were killed in a car wreck caused by Mexican drug dealer Pedro Hernandez in Oceanside, California, while Gibbs was deployed during Desert Storm. She first appears in "Hiatus" (Part 1).

=== Jordan Hampton ===
Dr. Jordan Hampton (Torri Higginson) first appears in the episode "Identity Crisis". When a "John Doe" is donated to science and Ducky finds mercury in his brain, he is outraged that the medical examiner who performed the autopsy did not think to check his brain before donating him. As he and Gibbs go to confront "him" (Ducky mistakenly assumed that Dr. Hampton was male), he asks Gibbs to think no less of him for giving the M.E. a piece of his mind. After finding out that Dr. Hampton was not male, Ducky was visibly placated. Jordan came back to Ducky's autopsy room to help him find anything else she might have missed, and decodes the tattoo on his arm, helping Gibbs and his team eventually solve the case. She also reveals in this episode that she likes things neat and clean. She made a reappearance in the episode "Broken Bird" to help Ducky overcome grief and guilt for euthanizing a tortured Afghan when he was a doctor in the military. The two show some romantic interest in both episodes. Also, although she did not appear in the episode, she gave Ducky the autopsy report for La Grenouille in the episode "Internal Affairs".

=== Margaret Allison Hart ===
M. Allison Hart (Rena Sofer) is an attorney. She is contacted by Colonel Merton Bell while he is being tried by the Mexican authorities for bounty hunting in their country. Hart successfully gets Bell released from prison on the condition that he not leave Mexico. Vengeful against the man who sent him to prison, Bell sends Hart to Washington to defend any accused who are involved in Gibbs' investigations. Hart starts to take up every case that involves Gibbs. Hart's skills as a lawyer are a match for Gibbs' skills as an investigator. Despite their animosity, they appear to be attracted to one another. It is implied that they share a kiss at the end of one episode. In the episode "Mother's Day", when Gibbs' former mother-in-law (Shannon's mother) becomes a suspect in a murder investigation in which the victim was linked to the cartel responsible for the deaths of Shannon and Kelly, Gibbs covertly hires Hart to defend her. He then deliberately makes procedural errors to prevent her arrest and prosecution, permitting Hart to get her out of NCIS' custody. In the episode "Patriot Down", Abby writes a report on the murder of Mexican drug dealer Pedro Hernandez, a crime committed by Gibbs in 1991 in retaliation for Hernandez' murder of Gibbs' wife and daughter. The report never makes it to Mexico as it is intercepted by Hart, indicating that she has switched her allegiances. Her last appearance is "Rule Fifty-One", in which she confronts Gibbs over the report, and though she states that the report will end his career, she offers to defend him in court if it comes to that. Off-screen in "The Spider and the Fly", Hart resigns from her job at NCIS and moves away, taking the report with her in order to protect Gibbs from Paloma Reynosa and Alejandro Rivera, Hernandez's two children hell bent on revenge on Gibbs for their father's murder. After Alejandro accidentally kills Paloma, mistaking her for Gibbs, and is arrested, Hart mails the report back to Vance, who then puts it in storage.

=== Ari Haswari ===
Ari Haswari (portrayed by Rudolf Martin) is a terrorist who attacks and wounds both Gibbs and Gerald Jackson when he infiltrates the NCIS morgue during the episode "Bête Noire". NCIS initially identifies him as an undercover Mossad agent in the episode "Reveille", but he is really a rogue agent working for Hamas, and he is later found to be the leader of an Al-Qaeda cell in Washington, D.C., the latter info a correct summation made by Gibbs in "Twilight". Ari is an early archenemy of Agent Gibbs, as well as Eli David's first-born child. Both of his parents were medical doctors; Ari's mother, Hasmia Haswari, was Palestinian and his father, Dr. Benjamin Weinstein (actually Eli David using an alias), was Israeli. He underwent medical training in Scotland at the University of Edinburgh Medical School in order to serve undercover inside the Gaza Strip, where his mother was killed during a retaliatory bombardment by Israel. The event prompted Ari to join the radical Islamic cause. It is shown that he hates his Israeli father since Eli David arranged for the attack on Gaza on a day when Ari was in the city. He preferred to be referred to as Haswari in school instead of Ari. Ari's motivation for his actions is his hatred of his father, who groomed him from birth to be a spy within Al-Qaeda, and was very likely the reason why Gibbs later suspects him in "Twilight" to be the head of an Al-Qaeda cell in Washington, D.C.

After murdering Special Agent Kate Todd in the episode "Twilight" and mounting several further attacks on NCIS members (including Gibbs) in the episodes "Kill Ari (Part I)" and "Kill Ari (Part 2)", his reign of terror finally comes to an end when he is killed by his half-sister, Mossad officer Ziva David, who is later offered and accepts a position at NCIS as Mossad liaison officer. It is revealed in the episode "Aliyah" by Director Vance that Ziva had been under orders to kill Ari, as he was out of control and planning a massive terrorist attack, and to gain Gibbs' trust in the process, which ended whatever secret Gibbs and Ziva could keep from the rest of NCIS. Ziva initially does not believe that Ari was an enemy agent and becomes his control officer in hopes of protecting him, until he nearly kills Gibbs. Ziva does not fully come to terms with killing her brother, and experiences moments of guilt and hurt, even with her departure from Mossad (after the beginning of season 7) and her new American citizenship coming through (in that season's finale episode "Rule Fifty-One"). Haswari is mentioned various times even after the character's death and Ziva's departure from NCIS. In the season 12 premiere, he is mentioned by terrorist Sergei Mishnev, the main antagonist of the season (Alex Veadov) (and Ari's own half-brother on their mother's side), who attempts to kill Gibbs in revenge.

=== Gerald Jackson ===
Gerald Jackson (Pancho Demmings) first appears in the episode "Yankee White". Gerald Jackson is Dr. Mallard's original assistant until being incapacitated by Ari Haswari after being held hostage in the morgue While recuperating from the gunshot wound to his shoulder, his position is filled by Jimmy Palmer. Approximately a year and a half later, a week before he was scheduled to return to work, Gerald is again captured by Ari Haswari in an effort to secure Dr. Mallard's attention. After Ari released him, Gerald was not seen again until "Kill Ari (Part 1)" and was replaced by Jimmy Palmer.

=== Nikki Jardine ===
NCIS Intelligence Analyst Nikki Jardine (Susan Kelechi Watson) first appears in the episode "Leap of Faith". She assists Gibbs' team in keeping watch on communications, and speaks fluent Arabic and Kurdish. When she is first introduced, Tony and the rest of the team are turned off by her germaphobic behaviour: reluctance to shake hands, wiping down phones with wet wipes before using them. In the episode "In the Zone", despite being a germaphobe, revolted at the idea of field work, Jardine asks to go to Baghdad with Tony. She ostensibly goes there on a case, but she also has her own reasons. Her brother had been injured while serving there, and a local villager, mistaken by Marines as an insurgent, was killed while attempting to help him, prompting Jardine to help the villager's children. Her last appearance is "In the Zone".

=== Clayton Jarvis ===
Clayton Jarvis (Matt Craven) is the Secretary of the Navy appointed after the events of the season eight finale, "Pyramid", which led to the resignation of Secretary Davenport. Jarvis is an old friend of Director Leon Vance and it seems that he comes highly recommended in D.C. Jarvis is introduced in the final scene in a meeting between himself, Director Vance and Anthony DiNozzo. In the meeting, Jarvis appoints DiNozzo to NCIS' black operations program and orders him to investigate an NCIS agent suspected of leaking information. When Jarvis hands DiNozzo the file with the agent's name, he recognizes the name but it remains unknown to viewers. In season nine's "Nature of the Beast", it is revealed that the mole is none other than Simon Cade, a member of E.J. Barrett's team. However, it is also revealed that Cade was framed earlier, and that Jarvis was supplied with misinformation by Sean Latham. Nevertheless, Jarvis proves to be an asset to the team such as when E.J. Barrett reappears. Jarvis lies to Sean Latham, knowing that he will leak the information to E.J.'s tracker, so that they can lead him into a trap. He later also helps a joint NCIS/PsychOps operation to apprehend the person who is blackmailing him with a copy of a top secret file. The blackmailer is believed to be Jarvis's childhood friend, Philip Wickes, whose company is about to lose its contracts with the Navy. The operation involves a faked assassination attempt on Jarvis to destabilize Wickes. Jarvis later dies in the Season 11 premiere episode, "Whiskey Tango Foxtrot" where he is the victim of a bombing; his death leaves Vance devastated. Following Jarvis's death, he is replaced by Sarah Porter (Leslie Hope).

=== Zoe Keates ===
Special Agent Zoe Keates (Marisol Nichols) is employed by the Bureau of Alcohol, Tobacco, Firearms and Explosives (ATF). Prior to 2001, Zoe worked for the Philadelphia Police Department alongside Anthony DiNozzo, where they were both rookie patrol officers at the same time. They were partners until DiNozzo transferred to Baltimore. In season twelve, Zoe and Tony meet during an investigation into a jihadist group. Sometime later, they begin a relationship, and DiNozzo introduces her to his father. In "Sister City", DiNozzo informs McGee and Bishop that he and Zoe have split up.

=== Trent Kort ===
Trent Kort (David Dayan Fisher) first appears in the episode "Smoked". He works for the CIA; while he usually manages to avoid getting caught for illegalities, he nevertheless almost always has his own agenda. He has a tendency to lie to peoples' faces, even Gibbs'. (In the episode "Dead Reckoning", he tells Gibbs that trust is elusive at best; Gibbs responds that, between them, it is not elusive but impossible.) He manages to keep a neutral relationship with everyone on Gibbs' team except DiNozzo, as he blows up Tony's car in the episode "Bury Your Dead" and keeps La Grenouille informed about Tony's relationship with his daughter, even though it is an undercover mission. However, Kort is shown to have some strong ties within the CIA, as he is able to get files for Gibbs on Ducky and Director Vance. It is also speculated that Kort killed La Grenouille, though it is implied Jenny Shepard may have also been responsible, as her Glock 19 magazine is found to have left the same imprints on a 9mm bullet as the one that killed "The Frog". Following the La Grenouille incident, Kort is assigned to a desk. After engineering a double murder, Kort approaches Gibbs for help in tracking down one of NCIS' most-wanted criminals, and seizes $300 million in illegal assets for the CIA's use—attempting to get his old field-agent job back. Gibbs believes that Kort may be more dangerous behind a desk than when he is in the field.

Kort returns in season eight, tracking down Lt. Jonas Cobb—also known as the Port-to-Port Killer—at the behest of the CIA. Aware of Cobb's identity from the beginning of the investigation, Kort tries to save one of Cobb's victims; but the effort costs him his left eye, which he sends to the NCIS team. Kort is later revealed to have been the training officer for Operation Frankenstein, the "super soldier" program in which Cobb participated. Cobb wants revenge on all those who made him a killer and that includes Kort, whom he kidnaps along with Jimmy Palmer and E.J. Barrett in the season finale. However, his real goal is to have revenge on the man who authorized the operation: SecNav Phillip Davenport. As he is waiting for Davenport to arrive, Cobb tortures Kort, Palmer, and E.J. with a water hose as a reminder of what he was put through during his training. Cobb is killed before he can kill any of the hostages. CIA agent Ray Cruz later receives a text message saying that Kort is in Tel Aviv and that he has to go there straight away. Kort also makes an appearance in NCIS: Los Angeles, revealing that he has worked with Agent G. Callen in the past.

Kort returns in Season 13 "Dead Letter", with a glass eye replacing his lost one. He is found assaulting an MI6 agent, Clayton Reeves. Later in the season, it is revealed that Kort is the man responsible for framing British agent Jacob Scott, with Kort being revealed as the person who sold nuclear secrets to the Russians, therefore being shown as the main antagonist of that season, and later also being responsible for the apparent death of Ziva David, after hiring a contract killer to burn down Eli David's farmhouse in Israel in a mortar attack. Eventually, he is confronted and killed by Reeves and the NCIS team and FBI agent Tess Monroe when they arrive on the scene and confront him over his actions.

=== Brent Langer ===
Special Agent Brent Langer (Jonathan LaPaglia) first appears in the episode "Tribes". He is killed in the episode "Last Man Standing" by Agent Michelle Lee, and initially suspected of being a mole. Lee is, in fact, the mole, as Langer learns, and she kills him to preserve her cover. He was mentored by Gibbs at NCIS before joining the FBI and is transferred back to NCIS at Gibbs' recommendation. He works with Gibbs' team in the episode "Tribes", where he assists the team in tracking down a terrorist recruiter. Gibbs places his voided FBI agent ID card on a wall commemorating fallen personnel in the episode, "Collateral Damage", just as Gibbs is turning his suspicion back to Agent Lee.

=== Michelle Lee ===
Special Agent Michelle Lee (Liza Lapira) first appears in the episode "Shalom". She is brought in between season three and four to bring the team back up to full strength following the departure of Gibbs. Following Gibbs' return early on in the season she is transferred to the legal department and is frequently seen delivering warrants to the team, also having a covert intimate relationship with the medical examiner's assistant, Jimmy Palmer. She returns to the series in season six as part of Gibbs' new team, but is reassigned after the first episode. It is revealed that she is a mole in NCIS who has accessed for a foreign power at least the Joint Chiefs' strategic battle plans for a potential Middle Eastern operation, if Israel's enemies were to once again make war upon her. In the course of her espionage, Lee kills Special Agent Brent Langer and Petty Officer Steve Vargo, whom she was blackmailing for the aforementioned classified information. Although Gibbs figures out gradually that she is a spy, and affirms his conclusions by inserting a picture of an agent she shot, as if he were the spy, on a barwall "Slain Heroes" wall ("Collateral Damage"), she is caught in the next episode "Cloak". However, when caught she claims that she was forced to trade government secrets because her daughter Amanda has been kidnapped. But Amanda, it turns out, is actually her sister. The deaths of their parents prompted Lee to raise Amanda as her child. In the episode "Dagger", after she learns that Amanda is safe, she gives Gibbs silent permission to kill the Weatherman, the person responsible for the crimes. The Weatherman uses her as a human shield until Gibbs fires into Lee's abdomen, the bullets passing through her body and killing both of them. Director Vance hints that she may have been headed for a death sentence had she survived as punishment for having committed treason against the United States with her actions. When asked by Vance if Lee should be called a hero or a villain, Gibbs responds simply, "Both".

=== Gayne Levin ===
Special Agent Gayne Levin (Alimi Ballard) was an NCIS special agent on the team of E. J. Barrett who appears in three episodes in season eight. In the episode "Swan Song", he is shot and killed in a shootout with Jonas Cobb.

=== Jake Malloy ===
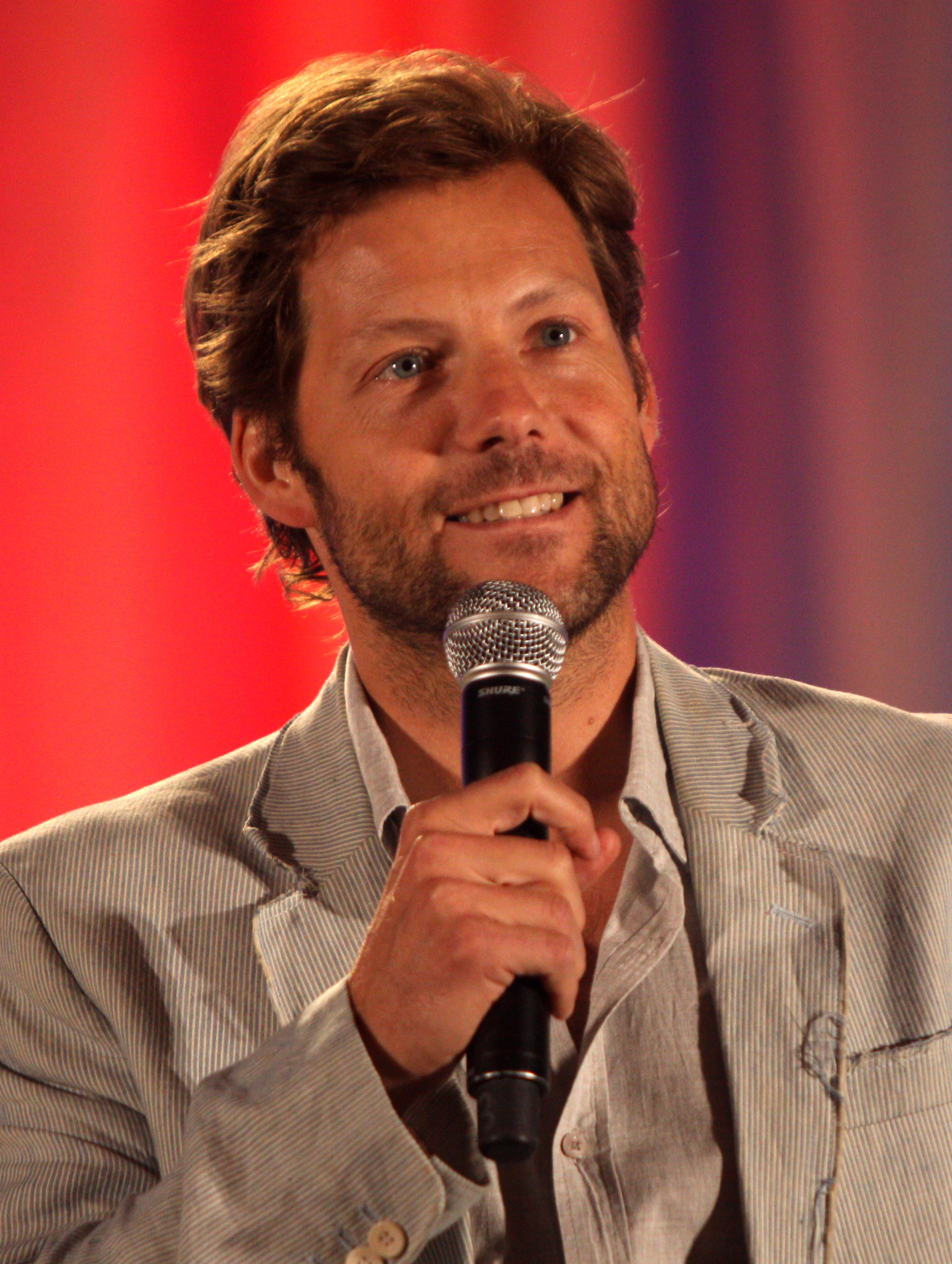
Jamie Bamber appears as Jake Malloy

Jake Malloy (Jamie Bamber) is NCIS Agent Ellie Bishop's ex-husband and an attorney for the National Security Agency. He becomes friends with Ellie's boss, SSA Leroy Jethro Gibbs. After her transfer from the NSA to NCIS, Jake and Ellie's marriage begins to show signs of stress, which he disingenuously attributes to the fact that they can no longer talk about their day with each other like they used to. However, it is revealed, in the season 13 episode 9 "Day In Court", that Jake has been dishonest, having an affair with fellow NSA employee Taylor Matthews. Following this revelation, Bishop returns home to Oklahoma for some time to herself. Then in the "Spinning Wheel", Jake comes to Bishop and makes attempts to apologize for the infidelity, but she recognizes that an affair is only a symptom of a wider pattern and tells him that their marriage is over.

=== Hollis Mann ===
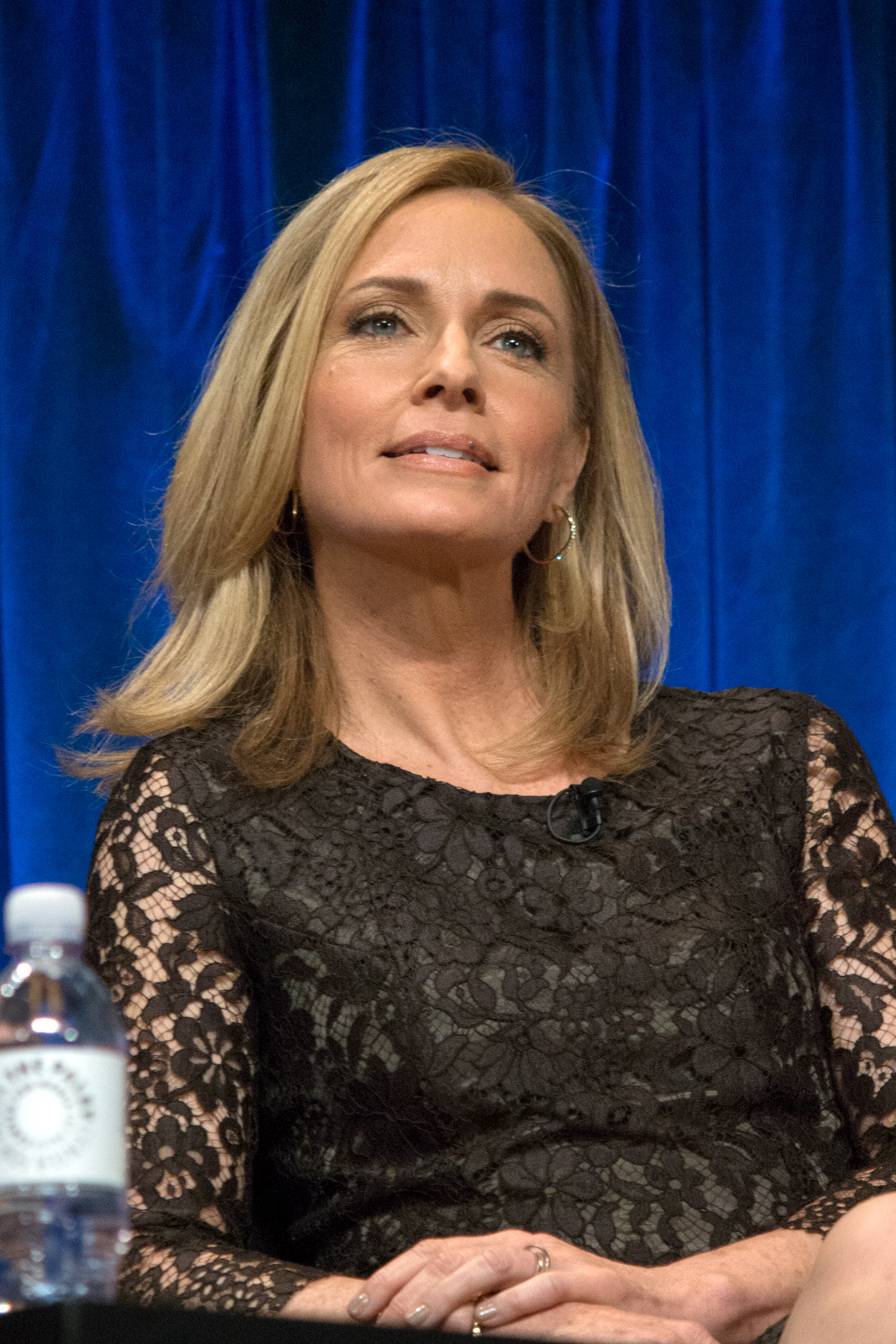
Susanna Thompson starred as Hollis Mann.

Lieutenant Colonel Hollis Mann (Susanna Thompson) is a unit commander in the United States Army Criminal Investigation Command, NCIS's counterpart in the Army. She first appears in the episode "Sandblast". Mann is assigned by her superiors to work on a co-operative investigation with NCIS involving a bombing at the Army-Navy Golf Club. She and Gibbs have a serious relationship, even earning the nickname "future ex-wife number four" from DiNozzo. Their attraction becomes overt in the episode "Sharif Returns", as they discuss their possible relationship but refuse to act on it until Sharif is caught. At the end of the episode, they kiss. Mann is one of few characters who may know how Gibbs removes the boats from his basement, as the episode ends with her asking Gibbs directly of it, but ends before Gibbs gives any sort of response. Although she and Gibbs clearly have serious feelings for each other, she is often frustrated by his reluctance to express his emotions. In the episode "In the Dark", she returns from choosing her successor and is upset to find that Gibbs has worked through the night to fix her home's plumbing, seeing it as a sign that he does not want to stick around. She confronts him, saying, "I'm aware there are three billion men in the world, and not all of them have to want me, but you should want me, and the fact that you don't makes me wonder why I ever wanted you." He calmly informs her that he worked on the plumbing through the night because he wanted to surprise her, but that "it's gonna be a bigger job than I thought... it's gonna take a while". She realizes that this is his oblique way of committing to their relationship for the long haul and kisses him fiercely.

In the episode "Ex-File" the relationship with Gibbs ends when she discovers the truth about Shannon and Kelly from Ducky and realizes that Gibbs is still silently mourning their deaths. She is offered a position at NCIS by Director Jenny Shepard, but instead chooses retirement from the Army, in the episode "In the Dark". In the episode "Lost and Found", the military newspaper Stars and Stripes Shepard is reading reveals that Mann has relocated to the Hawaiian island of Lanai. Mann reappears in the eleventh-season episode "Kill Chain", as a special agent for the Defense Criminal Investigative Service, which is the criminal investigative arm of the Department of Defense's Office of the Inspector General, and she later returns in the NCIS Season 12 episode, "We Build, We Fight".

=== John McGee ===
Admiral John McGee (Jamey Sheridan) is the father of Timothy McGee. He appears in "Squall", where it is revealed that he has cancer. In "House Rules", ADM McGee passes away.

=== Sarah McGee ===
Sarah McGee (portrayed by Sean Murray's real-life stepsister Troian Bellisario) is the younger sister of Timothy McGee. She makes two quick cameos in Seasons 2 and 3 before making a full appearance in "Twisted Sister".

=== Tess Monroe ===
Tess Monroe (Sarah Clarke) is an FBI Senior Special Agent. After working with Tobias Fornell, Monroe joins NCIS in the hunt for British spy Jacob Scott during season thirteen. She participates in a shootout with the NCIS team that results in the intentional death of Trent Kort. Executive Producer Gary Glasberg described Monroe as "full of fire and cynicism and sarcasm and wit and energy and is extremely experienced". Tess has been divorced multiple times, but has no children. She "thinks of her team as her family. She's no-nonsense on the outside, but has a big heart underneath with a belief in honor, justice and doing what's right. She'll fight to protect the values she holds dear, and her team, with determination and a bit of sarcasm".

=== Leroy Jethro "LJ" Moore ===
Leroy Jethro "LJ" Moore (Billy Dee Williams) is the childhood friend of Jackson Gibbs and his future wife Ann — Jethro Gibbs's parents. They were all friends growing up together. Jackson and LJ both fell in love with Ann, but Jackson married her. LJ is "The Namesake" of Jethro Gibbs, and according to Jethro, it was LJ who inspired him to join the Marine Corps as a teenager. LJ stands next to Jethro Gibbs at Jackson's funeral in Season 11's final episode "Honor Thy Father".

=== Thomas Morrow ===
Thomas Morrow (Alan Dale) is the Director of NCIS until the beginning of season three. He first appears in the NCIS two-part pilot episodes, "Ice Queen" and "Meltdown", before making his official debut in the season one episode, "Yankee White", with his final appearance as NCIS Director in the season three opener "Kill Ari (Part I)", when he leaves to accept an appointment as a Senior Division Chief in the Department of Homeland Security. He appears in several episodes during seasons one and two, but unlike his replacements, Directors Shepard and Vance, Morrow himself is not part of the main cast, and is credited as either a recurring character or a guest star. He has less direct involvement with the team's cases than either of his successors (exceptions being matters of terrorism and national security), and seems to spend much of his time in MTAC monitoring NCIS' global presence. While he seems to like Gibbs, he is less tolerant of Gibbs' personal style and methods than Jenny or Vance; he has a deeply serious, almost stern demeanor, and Gibbs only ever refers to him as "sir". This is probably due to Gibbs being a former Gunnery Sergeant / Scout-Sniper in the U.S. Marine Corps. and Morrow being a former Rear Admiral in the U.S. Navy. He reappears in his Homeland Security position in the Season 10 episodes, "Chasing Ghosts" and "Berlin". He also appears in the Season 11 premiere episode, "Whiskey Tango Foxtrot" where he is left badly injured in an explosion that kills current SECNAV, Clayton Jarvis. Morrow later informs Vance that a terrorist group, the Brotherhood of Doubt, are responsible for the bombing and are targeting former NCIS Special Agent Ziva David. In the season 13 episode, "Return to Sender", Morrow is found dead, having been shot in the head by a sniper the team presume is former British spy Jacob Scott, although it is later revealed that the actual killer is former CIA agent Trent Kort.

=== Chris Pacci ===
Special Agent Christopher "Chris" Pacci (Tim Kelleher) is an NCIS special agent who worked at NCIS Headquarters with Special Agent Gibbs for at least three years. He was murdered in "Dead Man Talking".

=== Richard Parsons ===
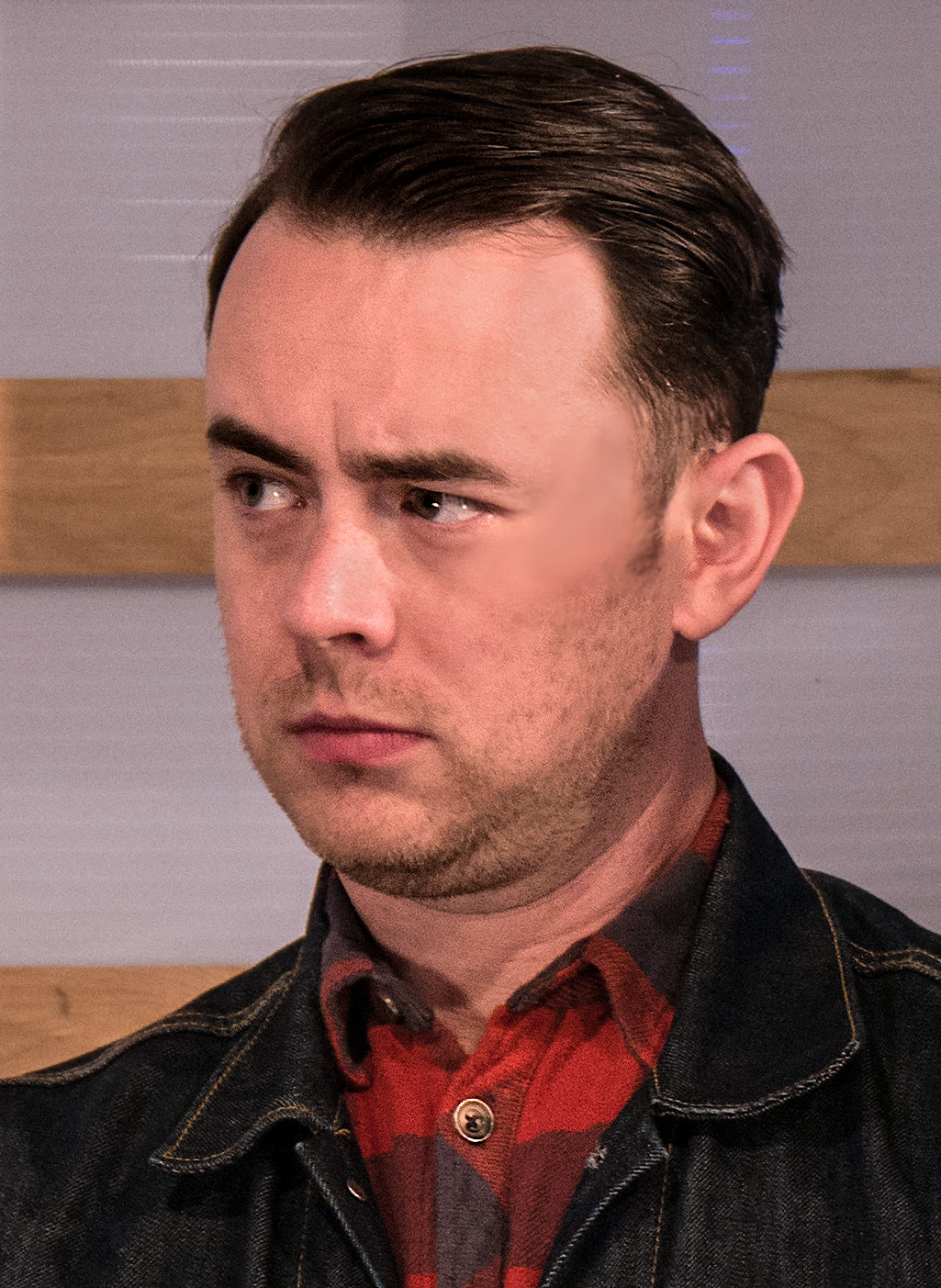
Colin Hanks played Richard Parsons.

Richard Parsons (Colin Hanks) is an investigator who works for the Department of Defense Inspector General. He also bears some resemblance to Timothy McGee, causing Anthony DiNozzo and Abby Sciuto to refer to him as McGee's "evil doppelgänger". He first appears in "Double Blind", the penultimate episode of season 10, in which he is investigating the aftermath of the NCIS team's handling of the Ilan Bodnar case. Initially believed to be pursuing Ziva David, and then Director Vance, the team soon learn his target is Leroy Jethro Gibbs. Parsons goes to great lengths to take Gibbs to court for all of his "wrongdoings", but after a bombing that results in the death of SECNAV Clayton Jarvis in the season 11 premiere episode "Whiskey Tango Foxtrot", Parsons' perspective on Gibbs' team changes after Gibbs defends him during an ambush in Iran. Parsons repays the debt by saving Gibbs' life during a gunfight. Later, back in Washington, D.C., Parsons drops his investigation into NCIS and also grants McGee, David, and DiNozzo permission to get their badges back and become agents again.

=== Phineas ===
Phineas (Jack Fisher) is a 9-year-old boy who lives across the street from Gibbs. He and Gibbs first make contact after he throws a baseball through Gibbs' window. Gibbs and he spend much time together, including when Gibbs provides help for a science project. In the season 17 episode "IRL", Phineas' video-gaming abilities help the team capture a murder suspect. Phineas' parents are said (by his mother Sarah) to have been locked in a custody battle over him. It is later revealed that his mother, whose real name is Sahar, is the woman trying to kill Ziva.

=== Sarah Porter ===
Sarah Porter (Leslie Hope) is the incumbent United States Secretary of the Navy. Recruited without any military background, she is the first female to hold the position. She attended Harvard and attained a business degree, before becoming a career politician. She is divorced and has one daughter, Megan, who is revealed to be a teenager. Gibbs is later tasked with locating her daughter after she is kidnapped in "React", an event which leads Porter to question her future as the Secretary of the Navy, although she remains at her post as of season 14.

Secretary Porter has also appeared in an episode of season 2 of NCIS: New Orleans, and has frequently been mentioned on NCIS: Los Angeles, although she never physically appeared in any episodes of the latter series.

=== Paloma Reynosa ===
Paloma Reynosa (Jacqueline Obradors) is the head of the Reynosa drug cartel, the most powerful cartel in Mexico, the daughter of drug dealer Pedro Hernandez and the elder sister of Mexican Justice Department official Alejandro Rivera. Paloma took over control of the cartel when her husband died. During her years in charge, the cartel grew to be powerful enough to infiltrate the US Navy. As a way to try to end the drug war in Mexico, the Mexican government launches a task force project with American law enforcement agencies to strike against the cartels. Paloma is contacted by Colonel Merton Bell, who is seeking revenge against the man who had sent him into a Mexican prison: Agent Gibbs. Bell has uncovered evidence that Gibbs killed Paloma's father with a sniper rifle in 1991. They form a partnership and elaborate a scheme to have revenge on Gibbs. Paloma's brother, Alejandro, uses his position in the task force to get the forensic evidence linking Gibbs to the murder using Abby Sciuto's skills. When the evidence is uncovered, Bell sends Lieutenant Jason Paul Dean to kill Special Agent Lara Macy, who knew about Hernandez' murder but covered up the evidence while still an MP officer, believing it to be a just killing. Later, Bell tries to kill Mike Franks but Paloma needs him alive as leverage so she orders Dean to kill Bell and bring back Franks' severed finger. He also returns with Gibbs taken prisoner. Paloma tells him of her true intention: she doesn't want his death, she wants his life. She wants Gibbs to work for her or she will kill his friends and family, starting with his coworkers and finishing with his father.

Four months later, Paloma is lured to a safe house where she believes Gibbs, Jackson, and Mike Franks have taken refuge. Alejandro arrives separately, having been tricked into believing Paloma is dead through a note purposely left behind by Director Vance and Agent DiNozzo as bait for a trap. He then opens fire on the safe house with a submachine gun, believing Gibbs and his father to be in it. After being arrested, Alejandro soon learns that Paloma was actually in the safe house all along, resulting in Alejandro unintentionally killing his sister. Paloma then recites the poem of the spider and the fly as her last words before dying. Paloma has a fascination for the work of Tennessee Williams, citing him on three occasions: twice in "Rule Fifty-One" ("We are all sentenced to solitary confinement within our own skins for life" and "Cruel men consider themselves paragons of frankness") and in "Spider and the Fly" ("Don't look forward to the day you stop suffering for when it comes you'll know you're dead.").

=== Alejandro Rivera ===
Alejandro Rivera (Marco Sanchez) is a high-ranking official of the Mexican Justice Department and, secretly, the son of drug dealer Pedro Hernandez and the brother of Paloma Reynosa who is the head of the Reynosa drug cartel. Rivera is assigned by his government to be a liaison with American law enforcement agencies on a special anti-drug project of forming a Mexican-American task force to strike against the drug cartels, notably against Reynosa. Secretly, Rivera's objective is to have revenge for his father's death by using Abby Sciuto's forensic skills to investigate the cold case while training a class of task force forensic specialists in Mexico. It is later revealed that Gibbs killed Hernandez and Rivera was counting on Abby's report to bring Gibbs down but it never reaches Mexico having been intercepted by Margaret Allison Hart, who is working on the task force project. However, Alejandro makes one huge mistake when he arrives at NCIS and later threatens Abby, prompting the entire team, including Leon Vance, to have him removed. He is duped into thinking that his sister, Paloma, had been killed, and goes to the safe house she was at, thinking that he can kill Gibbs and his father. However, he ends up killing Paloma and is then arrested for her death. He reappears in season 11's finale "Honor Thy Father" when it is revealed that he used his cartel to fund operations for the Brotherhood of Doubt after Parsa's death, as a result of the two sharing a common enemy— Agent Gibbs.

=== Michael Rivkin ===
Michael Rivkin (Merik Tadros) first appears in the episode "Last Man Standing" as a Mossad officer. He is working with Ziva David when she is on an undercover mission for the Mossad in Morocco (Ziva having been dismissed from NCIS in the previous episode). Later on in the episode, he is seen in the office of the head of Mossad, Eli David, Ziva's father, as Ziva talks on the phone to Gibbs. Tony becomes suspicious of the man that Ziva appears to be dating, and keeps trying to find out who he is. For example, in the episode "Legend (Part 1)", Tony asks Abby to check the records on Rivkin. In the episode "Legend (Part 2)", Michael appears as an undercover Mossad agent who is investigating the same terrorists that NCIS is investigating, killing them off one by one before NCIS can apprehend them. He is asked to leave the U.S. by NCIS agent in charge in Los Angeles, Lara Macy and later by DiNozzo, both of them citing laws that prohibit foreign intelligence operatives from working in the United States but Rivkin ignores both warnings. In the episode "Semper Fidelis", what appears to be an open and shut case concerning the death of an Immigrations and Customs Enforcement agent is complicated by the presence of Rivkin, who is still in the US visiting Ziva. It is later revealed that Rivkin killed the ICE agent accidentally while attempting to render him unconscious (not knowing that the agent had an underlying medical condition). Tony traces communication with the terrorist's computer to Ziva's apartment, where he finds Rivkin. After attempting to arrest an intoxicated Rivkin for the murders of the ICE agent and the terrorist handler NCIS was tracking, Rivkin resists and a vicious struggle ensues; Tony is eventually forced to shoot Rivkin in self-defense. Ziva later enters her apartment and attempts to help Rivkin but he succumbs to his injuries and dies in hospital. Finally, in the episode "Aliyah", the relationship between Rivkin and Ziva comes out and this leads Gibbs, Leon Vance, and Tony to Israel. There Eli David accuses Tony of killing Rivkin out of jealousy and Ziva, no longer able to trust Tony, stays in Israel.

=== Samantha Ryan ===
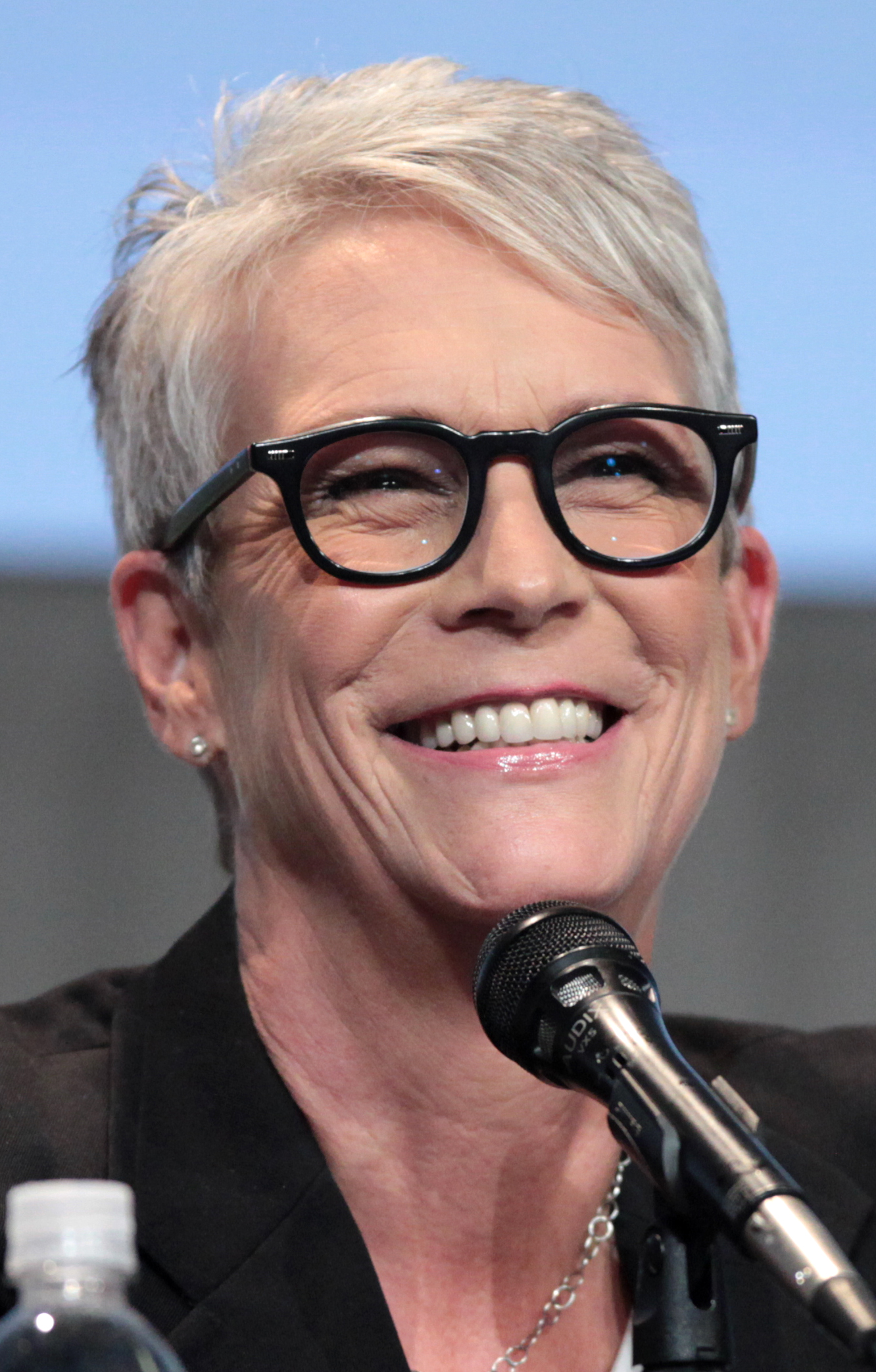
Jamie Lee Curtis appeared as Dr. Sam Ryan.

Dr. Samantha Ryan (Jamie Lee Curtis) is a psychologist, criminal profiler and Director of PsyOps. She is introduced in the episode "Psych Out" when a patient, a Navy warfare psychologist, of her colleague is found dead and Gibbs and his team are called in to investigate. She begins a romantic relationship with Gibbs and frequents his house, even causing him to be uncharacteristically late for work once. Like Gibbs, she has a young child, a son, and is either divorced or separated from her partner/husband. While Gibbs and Ryan try to keep their relationship strictly professional when at the office, Gibbs' agents and Ryan's co-workers frequently speculate on their relationship, as seen in "The Tell". Her last appearance is in "Till Death Do Us Part" when she is threatened by terrorist Harper Dearing, who is seeking revenge on everything and anyone connected with the Navy for the death of his son.

=== Leyla Shakarji ===
Leyla Shakarji (Tehmina Sunny) is the daughter-in-law of Mike Franks. She was disowned by her family and then smuggled out of Iraq after becoming pregnant with the child of Franks's biological son, Lance Corporal Liam O'Neill, USMC. O'Neill was murdered and Gibbs finds out about Leyla from Franks as he was the lead agent assigned to the case. She and her daughter, Amira, lived with Mike in Mexico until his death in 2011. Gibbs, as Amira's godfather, asks Leyla to move to Washington, D.C., to be nearer to him as he is their closest thing to family. Leyla's mother, Shada Shakarji (Diane Venora), is the tough-as-nails matriarch of one of the most prominent tribes in Iraq, due to the fact that most of her male relatives are now deceased.

=== Charles "Chip" Sterling ===
Chip Sterling (Michael Bellisario) first appears in the episode "The Voyeur's Web", as a new lab assistant working alongside Abby Sciuto, whom new NCIS Director Jenny Shepard has hired for her much to the displeasure of Abby, who continues to insist she prefers to work alone. As with most newbies, Chip ends up being the butt of Tony's jokes and is told off by Gibbs for lack of concentration on several occasions. Chip, having sinister motives, after being fired from his last job, attempts to frame Tony for murder (in which he almost succeeds) in the episode "Frame Up". In a last-ditch effort, he also attempts to attack Abby with a knife after being discovered, but she quickly subdues and hog-ties him with duct tape before asking Gibbs if she can now work alone.

=== Diane Sterling ===
Diane Sterling (formerly Gibbs, Fornell) (Melinda McGraw) is the first ex-wife of Leroy Jethro Gibbs, the ex-wife of FBI Special Agent Tobias Fornell and DHS Special Agent Victor Sterling, and the mother of Emily Fornell. She makes her first full appearance in "Devil's Triangle" in 2011, but appears in a brief cameo (portrayed by an uncredited actress, Heather Scobie) in "Angel of Death" in 2007. When she divorced Gibbs, Diane took his money, including his grandfather's watch. Similarly, after her divorce from Fornell, she got his money as well, in addition to joint custody of their daughter. Before Emily was born, Diane worked for the IRS as a tax auditor; in 2012, she returns to the IRS and is made a special agent / criminal investigator with the Internal Revenue Service Criminal Investigations Division (IRS-CID), much to the shock of her federal agent ex-husbands. In "Check", Diane is murdered by Sergei Mishnev in a re-creation of Special Agent Caitlin Todd's death at the hands of Ari Haswari in "Twilight" with Diane dying after being shot in the head by Sergei who uses a sniper rifle. In "Cabin Fever", Diane is avenged when Fornell finally kills Sergei Mishnev.

=== Cyril Taft ===
Captain Cyril Taft, M.D., USNR (Jon Cryer) is a doctor who appears in the NCIS Season 13 premiere episode, "Stop the Bleeding" where he performs surgery on Gibbs, who has been left badly injured after being shot by Luke Harris. Taft is a former surgeon at the Walter Reed Memorial Hospital. Taft's son died at a young age. Taft later begins a friendship with Gibbs, and the two are shown to mutually support each other through their respective struggles. He also convinces Gibbs to seek counseling and eventually is able to make an introduction to his therapist, Grace Confalone.

=== Joanna Teague ===
Joanna Teague (Mimi Rogers) is a senior CIA officer. The mother of Ned Dorneget, Teague works with both DiNozzo and Gibbs in the aftermath of his death.

=== Jackie Vance ===
Jackie Vance (Paula Newsome) was the wife of NCIS Director Leon Vance. In the season 10 episode "Shabbat Shalom", Jackie is shot in a drive-by shooting that kills Mossad Director Eli David, who was having dinner with the Vances at the time alongside Ziva, and dies in surgery. Jackie's estranged biological father, Lamar Addison, who was never married to her mother, walked out on Jackie and her mother and brother (Michael Thomas) when she was young. Vance and Jackie have two children: a daughter, Kayla, and a son, Jared. Jackie and Vance met while attending a University of Maryland basketball game where Len Bias was playing.

=== Kayla Vance ===
Special Agent Kayla Vance is an NCIS agent and the daughter of Leon and Jackie Vance. She is played by Naomi Grace as an adult, and was played by China Anne McClain and Kiara Muhammad as a child.

=== Carol Wilson ===
Carol Wilson (Meredith Eaton) is an immunologist who works for the Centers for Disease Control and Prevention (CDC). She first appears in the season 7 episode "Faith" when she visits her good friend Abby Sciuto at NCIS headquarters to ask for a favor. The character also makes a guest appearance in the spin-off NCIS: New Orleans, in the episode "Carrier", when she is consulted after the New Orleans agents find a Navy officer dead from a strain of bubonic plague.

=== Cassie Yates ===
Cassie Yates (Tamara Taylor), an NCIS special agent, first appears in the episode "SWAK" and again in the episode "Jeopardy". In her first appearance, it is revealed that she was trained by the late Special Agent Chris Pacci.

=== Harriet Parker ===
Harriet Parker (Nancy Travis) is the Navy Vice Admiral at the U.S. Navy and the estranged sister of NCIS Supervisory Special Agent Alden Parker. Both are having a deeply strained sibling relationship at odds, stemming from their contrasting childhoods and the tragic murder of their father, Roman.

== Crossover cast and characters ==
=== JAG ===
==== Vivian Blackadder ====
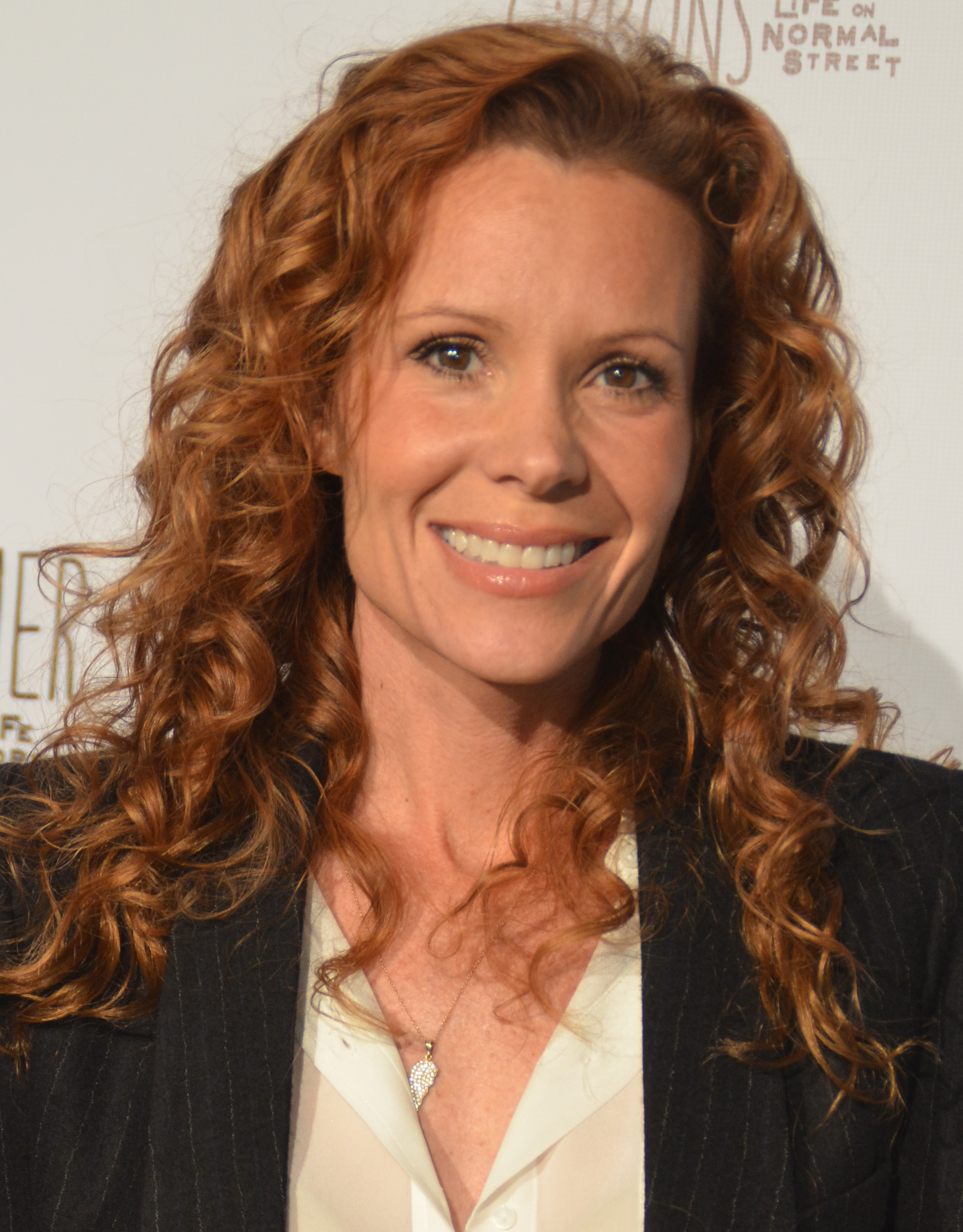
Robyn Lively starred as Vivian Blackadder in JAG.

Special Agent Vivian Blackadder (Robyn Lively) is a former FBI agent who joins NCIS after the attack on the USS Cole, in which her brother, Rex, was killed. Despite being a special agent, she seemed to be more focused on avenging her brother's death by any means possible rather than attempting to work with the rest of the team. Her obsession with getting revenge often drew Gibbs' ire—Gibbs told her to stay focused on their case or he would send her back to the FBI. Later, in the JAG episode "Meltdown", she blew an NCIS operation to capture a terrorist planning another attack. Although it is not shown, it is implied that she either returned to the FBI or was fired from NCIS for good because of her mistakes. She is the only major character who appeared in the NCIS backdoor pilot episodes from JAG, and then not in the series NCIS. Vivian Blackadder appeared in the JAG episodes "Ice Queen" and "Meltdown".

==== Faith Coleman ====
Lieutenant Commander Faith Coleman (Alicia Coppola) is a prosecutor for the Judge Advocate General's office. Coleman first appeared in the JAG episode "Meltdown" and went on to make several appearances on NCIS, assisting Gibbs and his team. She successfully defended Commander Harmon Rabb when he was accused of the murder of fellow JAG lawyer Lieutenant Loren Singer. Her last appearance to date was in the episode "Hometown Hero", although she was mentioned in the episode "Head Case". Faith Coleman recurred on NCIS, following several guest appearances on JAG.

==== Other appearances ====
- Adam Baldwin as Commander Michael Rainer, a US Navy SEAL assigned to Naval Amphibious Base Little Creek.
- Patrick Labyorteaux as Bud Roberts, a JAG officer. He first appeared during season 1 (concurrent with JAG season 9), during which time he was still a lieutenant at JAG Headquarters. He later reappeared in season 14 and 15 as a captain; the latter of which revealed that he was now the commanding officer of the Regional Legal Service Office Mid-Atlantic at Naval Station Norfolk.
- John M. Jackson as Rear Admiral A.J. Chegwidden (Ret.), a former Judge Advocate General of the United States Navy who joined the private sector after retiring from the navy. He appeared in season 10 to represent SSA Leroy Jethro Gibbs during a Department of Defense Inspector General investigation.

=== NCIS: Los Angeles ===
==== Lara Macy ====
Lara Macy (Louise Lombard) was a former USMC Lieutenant working as a military police officer, and almost two decades earlier had investigated then-USMC Gunnery Sergeant Leroy Jethro Gibbs' role in the murder of Mexican drug lord Pedro Hernandez. Due to the past investigation, their relationship was volatile until the OSP's operational psychologist Nate Getz revealed to Gibbs that Macy had been protecting him for eighteen years by covering up the evidence. Since Hernandez was responsible for the slaying of Gibbs' wife and daughter, Macy felt that his actions against Hernandez were justified, a move that would end up costing Macy her own life years later. In the NCIS: Los Angeles episode "Ambush", Hetty remarks to Director Vance that the last she'd heard, as the result of a political "witch-hunt", Macy was "working out of a quonset hut in Djibouti". This was contradicted on a subsequent episode of NCIS, where Macy's personnel file states that she never worked in Djibouti but was instead reassigned to Marseille, to head up an NCIS undercover team there. It is likely that the Los Angeles branch had been fed misinformation due to the covert nature of Macy's new assignment.

While in Marseille, Macy began working on a rape case involving a Petty Officer Second Class before later returning to the United States. In "Patriot Down", badly burnt remains were discovered in Annapolis with NCIS Special Agent Timothy McGee confirming that the remains were those of Macy, leaving the NCIS team and agency itself devastated. It was later revealed that Macy had been brutally murdered and her body set alight with her killer being revealed as Jason Paul Dean, a mercenary and former U.S. Army Ranger, as part of a plot to get to Gibbs in relation to the Hernandez case.

Lara Macy appeared in the NCIS episodes "Legend (Part I)" and "Legend (Part II)".

==== Other appearances ====
- Chris O'Donnell as G. Callen
- LL Cool J as Sam Hanna
- Daniela Ruah as Kensi Blye
- Barrett Foa as Eric Beale
- Peter Cambor as Nate Getz
- Brian Avers as Mike Renko
- Kelly Hu as Lee Wuan Kai

=== NCIS: New Orleans ===
- Scott Bakula as Dwayne Pride
- Lucas Black as Chris LaSalle
- Zoe McLellan as Meredith Brody
- CCH Pounder as Loretta Wade
- Shalita Grant as Sonja Percy

=== NCIS: Hawaiʻi ===
- Vanessa Lachey as Jane Tennant, NCIS Special Agent in Charge
- Jason Antoon as Ernie Malik, NCIS cyber intelligence specialist
- Noah Mills as Jesse Boone, NCIS second-in-command
