= Tony DiNozzo and Ziva David =

Characters from the NCIS television series

Michael Weatherly as Tony and Cote de Pablo as Ziva in a screencap from the NCIS season 5 episode, "Ex-File"

Tony DiNozzo and Ziva David are fictional characters from the American police procedural drama NCIS. Tony is portrayed by Michael Weatherly, and Ziva, who first appeared in the third season, is portrayed by Cote de Pablo. Frequently referred to by the portmanteau "Tiva" (for Tony and Ziva), the characters' flirtation and the idea of them eventually beginning a relationship became a subject of interest among viewers, and by 2010, TV Guide reported that "many fans have become obsessed with the romantic tension". Focus and media coverage on the pair escalated over the years, particularly after NCIS became the most watched television series in America during its tenth season.

The characters were initially scripted as having a "cat and mouse" relationship, something that continues into the later seasons. The pairing develops at a slow pace throughout the series and is dealt a number of obstacles. This includes Tony's "commitment phobias", Ziva's trust issues, a series of other love interests, and Ziva being taken captive and presumed dead between seasons 6 and 7 after a serious breakdown in their relationship.

In the season 13 finale, Ziva is seemingly killed by a mortar attack arranged by former CIA Agent Trent Kort, and Tony learns that he and Ziva have a daughter, whom she named after her sister, Tali. These events drive Tony to leave NCIS to look for answers and to care for their daughter.

In the season 16 episode "She", it is revealed that Ziva is alive and had gone into hiding. It is also implied that Ziva may still be working as an investigator in some capacity. A note left for Eleanor Bishop asks that Bishop keep the secret for "the safety of my (Ziva's) family". Ziva then reappears in the season 16 finale, "Daughters", to warn Gibbs he is in danger after he takes down drug dealers. Ziva reveals that she faked her death and went into hiding to protect Tony and Tali, after learning that a powerful woman named Sahar with ties to her brother Ari wanted her dead. After eliminating Sahar and her associates, Ziva returns home to Paris to reunite with Tony and Tali in the season 17 episode "In the Wind".

== Casting and concept ==
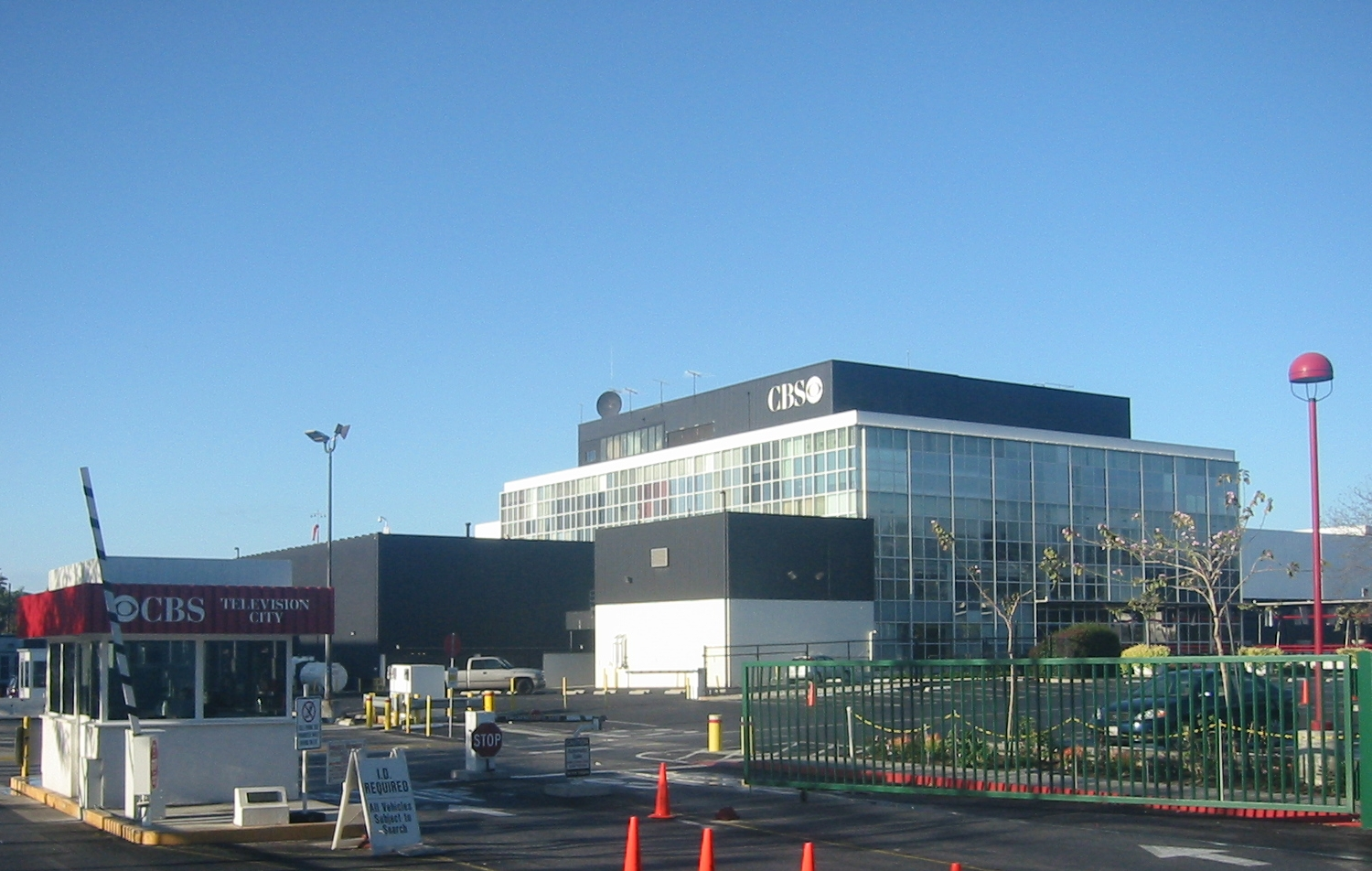
Cote de Pablo's screen test for NCIS took place at the CBS Television City studio in Los Angeles.

Michael Weatherly was cast for the role of Anthony "Tony" DiNozzo in 2003 and appeared in every episode of the show's first 13 seasons. The character is portrayed as "complex": he is a former Baltimore homicide detective with a "heroic spirit" as well as a "total dinosaur in terms of sexual politics".

In the second season finale, NCIS series regular Caitlin Todd was killed off after Sasha Alexander, who portrayed Todd, decided to permanently leave the show. Shortly afterwards, series creator Donald P. Bellisario voiced intentions to replace Todd with another female lead, whom he stated would be "someone foreign who brings a whole new attitude". He expressed hopes that the new character would be drastically different from Todd, who was "kind of uptight".

One aspect Bellisario wanted to change was the way the character would interact with Tony. Though Tony and Kate had a "wonderful dynamic", he ultimately thought that "[she] treated [him] like a big brother" and decided "to bring in a character that causes Tony to have to sit back and not quite be able to handle her".

Cote de Pablo, who was one of the last to audition, was set to perform opposite Michael Weatherly to test for chemistry. Weatherly improvised during the audition by brushing her hair back and commenting, "You remind me of Salma Hayek." De Pablo, who was initially upset by the departure from the script, stayed in character and "dismissed him completely". She later said in an interview, "He totally did it with the other [actresses]. One other girl sort of flirted back with him, and she was sort of open. Which is what actors do! They're sort of open. But I got lucky and got the part because I responded the way they felt was right."

According to Bellisario, CBS chief executive Leslie Moonves "took one look at her and said, Wow!" Co-executive producer Charles Floyd Johnson commented, "When you get actors who really listen and respond organically in the moment to what they're hearing, sometimes magic happens. They really seemed to get that immediately, and that doesn't always happen."

Producers eventually decided to make de Pablo's character, who was given "the arresting name of Ziva David", an Israeli agent. Bellisario had previously discussed possibly scripting her as European or Australian. She is introduced as having a soldier mentality and as "[someone] who was comfortable in her own sexuality and used to working with men on an equal footing".

== Development ==
=== Early seasons ===
Tony and Ziva first meet in the "Kill Ari" two-part story arc at the beginning of Season 3 during the manhunt for Ari Haswari, Kate's killer and Ziva's half-brother. Michael Weatherly and Cote de Pablo both point to "Under Covers", the eighth episode of that season, as the catalyst for the flirtation between the characters. The episode involves Tony and Ziva being sent undercover as a married couple, an assignment that requires them to simulate sexual relations in order to solidify their cover. De Pablo commented, "Michael and I talked about all of those scenes right before we did them. We had a totally different way of looking at it. In our minds, we thought the characters weren't faking anything. They just got carried away. Then all of the sudden after that, they saw each other in a different light." Weatherly discussed the creation of the "Under Covers" scenario:

This episode was so much fun to shoot. Cote de Pablo, who plays Ziva, came to me right before we were shooting the first scene where we kissed, and said, 'I've never kissed anyone on camera before.' I was expecting this timid little bird kiss, like a little peck, but she was like a lioness—she practically ate my head off! This is where TIVA (Tony+Ziva) started. We were told to really have fun with it, they wanted a sexy thing happening, and Cote delivered. I was just sort of along for the ride. And let's be honest, three out of the four letters in 'TIVA' are from Ziva, so what is the 'T' then? The crucible, is it the cross? I don't think so.

Tony and Ziva undercover as a married couple.

At the time, Bellisario said that he "kind of [likes] what's going on now" and that it was unlikely that the relationship would be taken further any time in the immediate future. De Pablo agreed, saying, "I would think if the characters get together, the whole mystery would be done. I think it will be a lot more fun to play the tension." She elaborated in another interview, "My character has sort of this understated flirtation with Michael's character, Tony. She gets jealous, but I think she would never admit it or hook up with someone in the workplace. He scares her to death. He is the epitome of the American man and all of the things that come out of his mouth are brutally stupid."

Tony is renowned for his juvenile sense of humor and "commitment phobias" while Ziva is characterized as "a tease" early on, a factor that de Pablo enjoyed playing "because [she's] so not that in real life". Some aspects of Ziva's personality disturb him, such as the fact that she sleeps with a gun in her hand and snores very loudly. However, as co-workers, they respect each other despite their frequent exchange of sarcastic remarks. Both have had a string of failed romances.

Team leader Gibbs (Mark Harmon) resigns in Hiatus (Part II), the third season finale, and appoints Tony as his replacement. During the 2006 summer break, it was reported that Ziva would fall under suspicion of being a spy in the fall premiere, and in the opening episode, "Shalom", she is framed by the Iranian government for the murder of a terrorist in FBI custody and the two agents guarding him. When she initially goes to the Israeli embassy to report their deaths, which she witnessed, Mossad Officer Michael Bashan asks her directly, "Did you or did you not sleep with him?" In response to her confusion, Bashan tells her that he knows that Tony has been visiting her apartment at least once a week for the past three months and that Mossad officers have been spying on her, evidently on orders from her father, Mossad Director Eli David.

I think they're just having a lot of fun watching us fight our way through it. I don't care either way and I have no idea. That's the fun aspect of not knowing...being bombarded by all this attraction and seeing them fight it or deal with it the best way possible. They're both very funny. Tony's always trying to hit on women and he doesn't try to hit Ziva. Those moments they get too close they try to brush themselves off and say 'Oh, that didn't happen.'

— Cote de Pablo

Throughout the episode, Tony vigorously defends Ziva's innocence to the FBI, as well as berating any agent who dares question her loyalty when her car is found at a bombing in downtown Georgetown. She is eventually cleared of all wrongdoing. Though Ziva never addresses Bashan's accusation and her relationship with Tony is left undefined, there is no overt romantic connection in subsequent episodes.

Shortly afterwards, Tony begins dating Jeanne Benoit (Scottie Thompson). His romance with Jeanne continues to progress throughout the year, and he remains tight-lipped about it when his colleagues notice the change in his behavior. When questioned about the effects this would have on Tony and Ziva's relationship, de Pablo commented, "Am I just being jealous? I don't know. I still love him very much, but I've sort of thrown away that possibility because I think he's really struggling with some immense feelings for somebody else." In an interview with Chicago Tribune, she clarified that Ziva "does have feelings for DiNozzo," but that she was uncertain that this would be addressed.

In the Season 4 finale, "Angel of Death", it is made apparent that Tony and Jeanne's relationship was orchestrated by NCIS Director Jenny Shepard (Lauren Holly) in hopes of catching Jeanne's father, an arms dealer. Jeanne breaks it off following this revelation, and their storyline is ultimately given closure in the fifth season episode "Internal Affairs".

Bellisario stepped down as executive producer in May 2007 after series star Mark Harmon threatened to walk due to alleged "overly long production days", and co-executive producer Charles Floyd Johnson and head writer Shane Brennan took over afterwards.

Following the fatal shooting of Director Shepard in the fifth season finale, the NCIS team is disbanded by the new Director Vance: McGee is sent to cyber crimes, Ziva is returned to Israel, and Tony is deployed on an aircraft carrier.

=== Michael Rivkin and captivity in Somalia ===
Season 6 focuses more on Ziva and Tony, but leaves their relationship undefined. Gibbs manages to have Ziva and McGee transferred back to the team in the premiere, but Tony is still acting as agent afloat on the USS Seahawk. In the following episode, Ziva accompanies Gibbs onto the Seahawk as part of a murder investigation and notices that Tony has pictures of her in a bikini pinned up in his room. After the investigation is closed, his deployment is ended prematurely and he is allowed to return to the team in the conclusion of the episode.

As the season progresses, Ziva seems to have become involved with someone while in Israel but refuses to discuss it. In "Nine Lives", after she plans a visit to Israel, Tony looks through her desk and finds a picture of an unidentified man (Merik Tadros). Before she leaves, he tells her to have a good trip ("Nisiya Tova") in Hebrew, demonstrating that he had at least made some effort to learn that phrase. In "Cloak", Ziva disobeys Gibbs' orders to not engage during a war game, attacking the guards to defend Tony. Later they both say that they are "tired of pretending": Tony about the politics in the hunt for the mole within the team, which required the team to withhold information from each other, and Ziva for reasons undisclosed.

Producers and writers for NCIS were initially divided over how to proceed with Tadros' character. In January 2009, some were suggesting possibly making him a relative of Ziva, an idea Cote de Pablo opposed. It was also proposed that Ziva would "stop toying with [Tony] completely" which would "drive him even more insane". De Pablo relayed, "We're going to play around with the idea that it could possibly be real love, and see how [he] deals with it." In March, executive producer Shane Brennan stated, "You've got what you might want to call a triangle. It's a triangle with very, very pointy ends. Someone's going to get hurt." He continued, "Something tragic will happen to Tony. Something tragic will happen to Ziva as well."

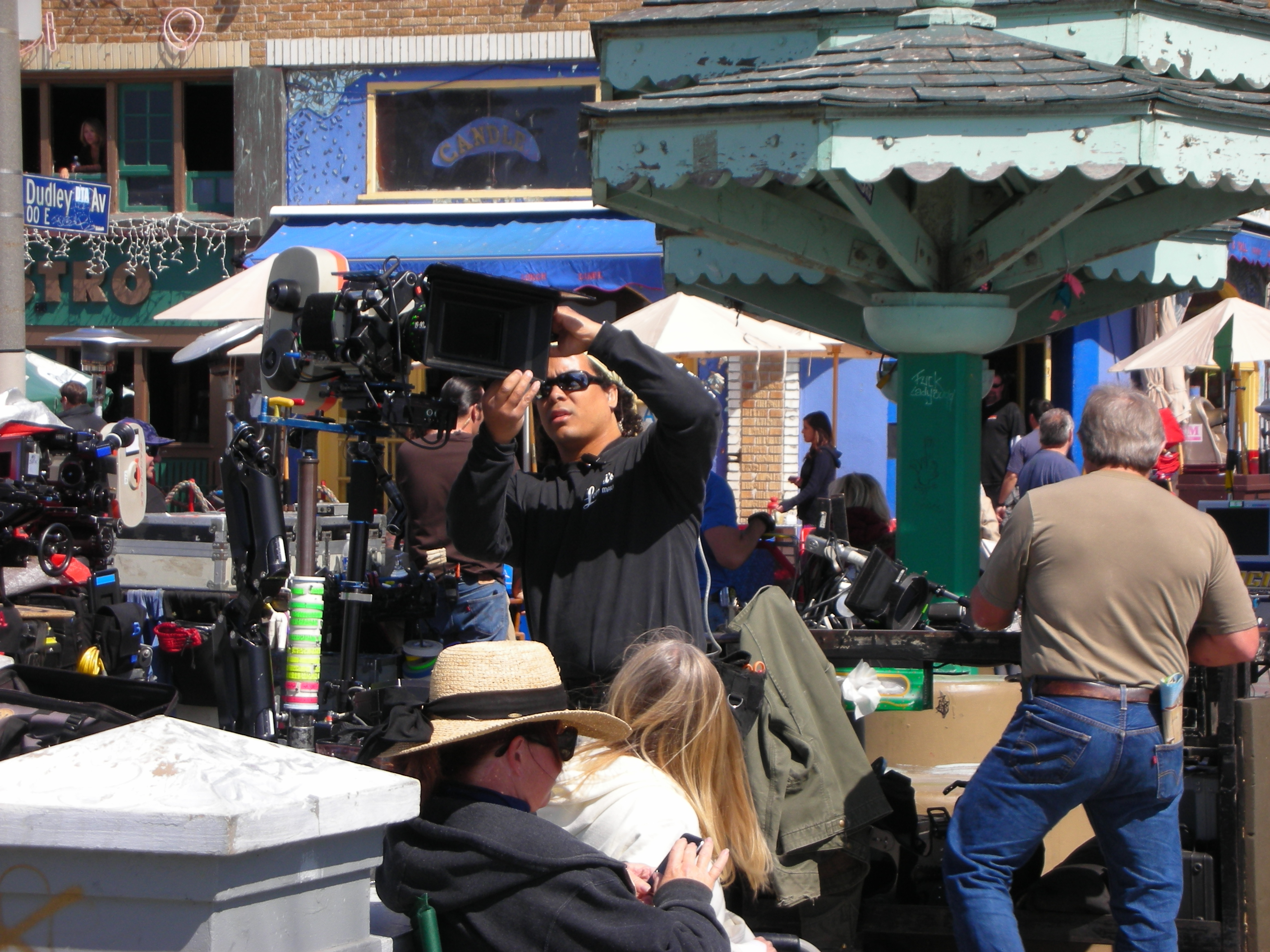
Filming of the "Legend" two-part story arc.

This comes to a head when Tadros appeared again portraying Mossad Officer Michael Rivkin in the "Legend" two-part, which also served as a backdoor pilot for the show's spin-off, NCIS: Los Angeles. He arrives in the United States during the NCIS team's hunt for members of a terrorist sleeper cell. Working independently, he draws ire from the agency when he kills suspects rather than bringing them in for questioning. Tony begins to doubt Ziva's loyalty to NCIS when she continues to defend Rivkin, and it becomes apparent by the end of Part II that she is involved in a relationship with him as the two are seen lying together in bed in the last few seconds of "Legend Part 2".

More details were released in the days preceding the finale. Michael Weatherly disclosed, "The way this season is ending, and what's gonna happen with Ziva and Tony and Rivkin, it's pretty massive and explosive, and it's gonna span four episodes." De Pablo added, "We could not be farther away from kissing. I'm telling you, it's not 'I hate you' [kissing sound] anger; it's 'I want to kill you' anger. Like, 'I want to shoot you in the head, but instead I'm gonna put my gun on your knee' anger….He does something to her that is almost unforgivable. However, the reason he does it is because he truly believes it's going to help her. Little does he know that he almost kills her." When asked how the storyline would affect Tony and Ziva's interactions, Tadros replied, "I think that love can hurt and heal. In this case, we'll have opportunity to see both of those things take place. I don't want to say too much, but... I think it will only make their connection stronger, as they learn a lot more about each other."

Viewers speculated that Ziva's romance with Rivkin was "arranged" and something that she was "trapped" in. Tadros responded:

Well, with the underworld of espionage, you would never really know. They could easily have been paired and had to be in love and then had to learn to love each other.... The way I've always approached it is that Rivkin loves Ziva. They've always wanted to add some suspense and mystery to all of it, but I would always say to the directors, 'How could I not love her?' But he also has a job to do. And so does she. [Executive producer] Shane [Brennan] is a genius, so it's been a great pleasure to just go along for this ride. I'm excited to watch the finale [airing May 19] myself just to see how it all plays out!

Tony confronts a drunken Rivkin at Ziva's apartment in the episode directly prior to the finale. When he attempts to arrest Rivkin for killing the leader of the terrorist cell in Los Angeles and also an ICE agent (which Mossad leader Eli David later reveals was an accident), a fight breaks out between the two men which eventually results in Tony being forced to shoot Rivkin in self-defense due to the fact that Rivkin is about to stab Tony with a piece of glass. Though he had acted in self-defense, Rivkin later succumbs to his injuries and dies with his death having serious repercussions for Tony and Ziva's relationship, and calling into question whether Ziva and Rivkin really loved each other, culminating in Ziva leaving NCIS to resume working for Mossad in the finale, "Aliyah". She is quickly assigned to take Rivkin's place on a mission to take down a terrorist in Somalia. In the closing moments of the episode, she is shown to have been captured and tortured nearly beyond recognition by a terrorist demanding information on NCIS.

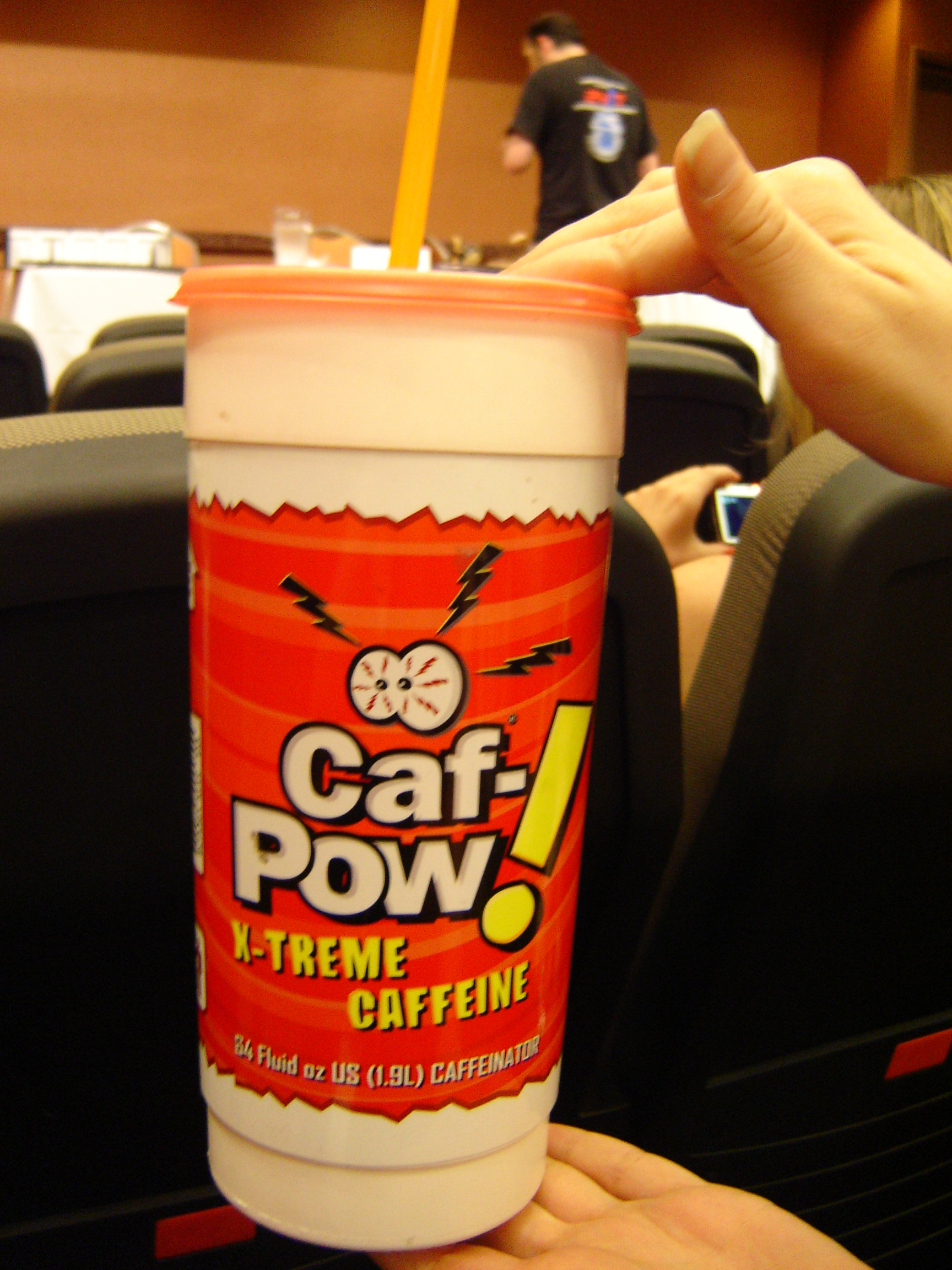
The team tracks the sale of "Caf-Pow!" to locate the camp where Ziva is held hostage in the Season 7 premiere.

Brennan reportedly kept the cliffhanger ending a secret from most of the cast, saying that "those pages were only in one copy of the script". Shortly after "Aliyah" aired, it was assured that Ziva "will be back next season. But she'll be a changed woman."

During the summer hiatus, de Pablo admitted that she was to a point tired of the producers teasing the pairing and said, "I wish the writers would just make it easy for us and just say, 'You know, go into the elevator and kiss passionately.' Or, [have us say] say, 'I don't like you.'" She added, "But I've always thought that, deep inside, Tony loves Ziva and Ziva loves Tony, but she's almost ashamed of saying it because he's so stupid. In the best of ways. That personal that he comes out with, that frat boy thing -- he's hiding constantly from the truth. It's just a big facade and she sees right through it."

In Season 7 premiere "Truth or Consequences", Tony initiates a mission of revenge against the terrorists believed to be responsible for Ziva's (presumed) death, traveling to Somalia along with Gibbs and McGee to avenge her murder. After intentionally allowing himself to be captured and interrogated, he finds that Ziva is actually still alive, having been held hostage the entire time. Upon being brought into the room to talk to him, she is shown to have been severely beaten and very weak as well as unsure of how to react at Tony's presence. Ziva asks why Tony is in Somalia, saying that he should not have come. Tony, under truth serum, first deflects. When Ziva asks again, he replies, "I couldn't live without you, I guess."

Eventually, Gibbs kills their captor with a long range head shot, allowing them to return safely to the US. In the following episode, there seems to be a great degree of awkwardness between them, which is ultimately resolved when Ziva confronts Tony in the men's room and thanks him, saying he would "always have her back" before kissing him on the cheek.

=== Recovery and outcomes ===
After all they've both been through, Tony and Ziva are very emotionally cautious around each other and will continue to circle each other warily. They have to get past this trust issue, which is: did Tony kill Ziva's boyfriend because he was jealous or because he actually was a threat? He was a threat, but whether or not Tony was actually jealous, that's up to the viewers to decide!

— Michael Weatherly, 2009

Though Tony and Ziva's "will they/won't they" tension appeared to progress during the first few episodes of the seventh season, Cote de Pablo had already stated that it would not be resolved in the immediate future. Michael Weatherly opined that putting the two characters together at the time would be "Kryptonite" due to Ziva's assassin background.

Ziva resigns from Mossad in the fourth episode of the season, "Good Cop, Bad Cop", and applies to become a full-fledged NCIS agent, effectively becoming the "probie"^{[note A]} on the team.

In December 2009, TV Fanatic announced that "the January 26 episode finds Tony and Ziva hopping a plane to the most romantic city on earth. The city of light, and of love. That's right, Ziva and Tony in Paris! You wouldn't believe it, but as if that weren't enough, their French hotel totally screws up the reservation and the two bad-ass agents end up ... gulp ... sharing a room together." Executive producer Shane Brennan disclosed, "There will be a realization that the spark is still there. It doesn't mean that something is going to be resolved, but it does mean that the journey may have started again. It's a long road back. When you think about what they went through, for them to resolve what happened and come to terms with that, it's a long road back."

During the episode, Ziva tells a witness that she and Tony shared a hotel room, and that she took the couch so she wouldn't have to hear Tony whine about his back. Tony in turn tells McGee that he took the couch. Ziva asks him why he lied and he returns the question. There was much speculation on the part of fans about whether the characters might have shared more than was divulged, but Weatherly said in response, "The truth of what happened is probably something that can be discovered inside the episode itself. If you really listen to what they say, I think it is pretty clear what happened: Nothing." He clarified that Tony and Ziva had "a tremendous amount of fun" in Paris and that, "Ziva had more fun with Tony than she thought she was going to have, which maybe shocked her a little bit, because she was so angry at him after he killed her boyfriend last year." Cote de Pablo added, "Michael has his views of what happened in Paris. I have mine. We haven't discussed it. But all I can say is it was good." Shortly afterwards, Glenn Diaz from BuddyTV reported that the cast was divided on whether or not the characters should be allowed to progress beyond "unfulfilled sexual tension".

In the following episode "Masquerade", Ziva mentions her time in Somalia, but refuses to give Tony much more than a few terse statements about it, though he was obviously willing to listen to her. In the final episode of Season 7, "Rule Fifty-One", Tony is forced to miss Ziva's citizenship ceremony due to an unexpected assignment from Director Vance, despite his personal promises to her that he would be there.

=== Port to Port Killer, EJ Barrett, and Ray Cruz ===
Executive producer Shane Brennan left NCIS to focus on the spinoff, NCIS: Los Angeles, and was replaced by Gary Glasberg in 2011.

The series introduced new love interests for both Tony and Ziva in the latter half of Season 8, and in February 2011, Michael Ausiello from TVLine announced that Ziva's boyfriend "Ray arrives in this season's 20th episode and is described as a handsome, charming, intelligent federal agent of Mediterranean or Latin American descent. He has a strong, nice-guy demeanor but—I'm quoting from the casting notice here—'there's a hint of a mystery behind his smile.'" A week later, Glasberg described the character as a "fun, smart, exciting addition", and Michael Weatherly commented, "I think it's going to be interesting. Tony cares about Ziva and wants to make sure she's not mixed up with the wrong kind of guy, so he's going to be watchful and protective of her." After Enrique Murciano was cast for the role of Ray Cruz, Cote de Pablo said, "You never know if you're gonna have chemistry, and since I had no say in the casting, I was sort of waiting to meet this famous Enrique Murciano." She went on to describe his appearance in the show: "There's a lovely scene in which he basically brings his interpretation of 'fancy' candlelight dinner, which takes place by the vending machines at NCIS. It's really funny. There's kissing involved. We kept it light and we kept it fun, and we kept it like two people who are genuinely in to each other and wanting to move things along. It's about what's going on between the lines. These two people are touchy-feely, and that's different for Ziva."

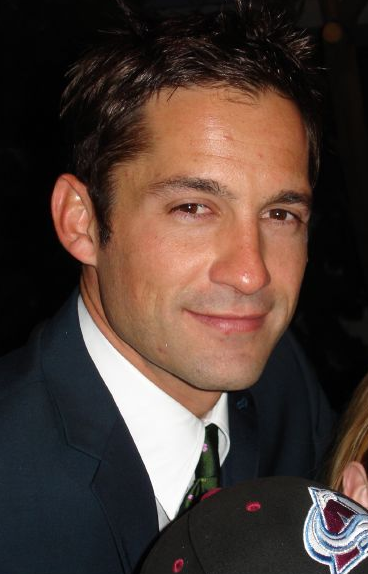
Enrique Murciano portrayed Ziva's boyfriend Ray Cruz during the eighth and ninth seasons.

The character of Erica Jane "EJ" Barrett (Sarah Jane Morris) was set to be introduced in the episode "One Last Score", which also marked Weatherly's directing debut. Weatherly divulged, "With the appearance of EJ, suddenly there's a renewed spirit that Tony has always had in him – it's what made him to go Africa and rescue Ziva with McGee. [Sometimes] he acts like a goofball because that's what people expect, but in this episode he comes away from that place. We'll see what the audience thinks, but for me, he feels potential and possibility in a way that he hasn't for years. EJ is a mirror, so he sees that hope for himself again." He added, "She's the diametric opposite of Ziva – physically, and in her demeanor, her way of being. She has her eccentricities as well, which makes her adorable to Tony and highly irritating to Ziva."

Around the same time, a "major serial killer plot" was launched that would center on "a murdering psychopath" called the Port to Port killer. TVLine reported, "this menace will prove to be extremely formidable — so much so that Gibbs will be forced to expand his team."

At the end of EJ's first episode, she begins a relationship with Tony. She is a team leader, having accepted the assignment in Rota, Spain that Tony had turned down several years prior. Ray, a CIA agent, first appears in "Two-Faced" after having evidently dated Ziva for several months. Ziva abruptly ends their relationship after learning that he had lied to her directly about his reasoning for being in Washington, D.C. and by omission about his role in the Port to Port killer case.

In the episode "Swan Song", former NCIS agent Mike Franks is killed by the Port to Port killer, who is identified as Lieutenant Jonas Cobb, and Ziva turns to Tony for comfort while the team is grieving over his death. She is kidnapped by Cobb in the following episode, the Season 8 finale, and Tony shows great concern. When EJ assures him that they will find Ziva, he replies that "it's just different for some of us".

EJ takes an extended leave of absence with the conclusion of the season. Ziva and Ray repair their relationship somewhat, and he gives her an empty ring box as a "promise" before leaving for a long-term assignment. Glasberg commented, "Ziva and Ray are a little open-ended at the moment. There isn't any closure to it. We'll have to see where it leads, but I think he was pretty clear that he has a job to do at the moment, and that's gonna be the primary focus for him." The use of the ring box was criticized by viewers as an "empty gesture".

EJ returns for a guest appearance in the Season 9 episode "Housekeeping". After a fallout with Tony, she tells him that Ziva respects him and cares about him. He at first deflects but then says, "Surround yourself with people you would give your own life for." At the end of the show, he and Ziva have a brief discussion about their relationship but are interrupted when Ray calls her. Ray returns after spending several months on his overseas assignment in the following episode and proposes to Ziva, much to her shock.

Glasberg said that Tony would not openly oppose the possibility of her getting engaged, explaining, "Tony wants Ziva to be happy. He's protective of her and cares about her and has feelings for her, and, at the end of the day, wants to make sure that she's safe and happy with the direction of her life." Though Ziva accepts Ray's proposal after some hesitation, she confronts him and breaks off the engagement after realizing that he had killed a woman on American soil while attempting to rectify a failure from overseas. Afterwards, Tony comforts her and assures her that she will find someone, though she insists she is content with the fact that marriage and children aren't in her life right now. Tony asks her if she is really happy with her life, and she responds by asking him the same question. When the deceased's husband thanks them for solving the case and mistakes them for a couple, they tell him that they are just good friends, and he advises them to cherish their friendship, as Ziva and Tony look at each other, perhaps with a sense of agreement.

=== Season X and the Year of Tiva and an emotional farewell ===
They've been through extraordinary circumstances together, so it doesn't necessarily require the explosion. There's a real, plain-spoken, straight read between them, so they don't have to jump through hoops. When she watches Tony does his stuff or he watches her hide behind that barricade of an Israeli assassin princess mentality, they both clock it, they know it and they can move around each other. It's a great relationship.

— Michael Weatherly, 2013

In the ninth season finale, "Till Death Do Us Part", a bomb is planted by domestic terrorist Harper Dearing. Tony and Ziva, feeling bad about missing Jimmy and Breena's wedding, try to cheer each other up by joking about how awful weddings are—an exchange that begins to take on meaning when they become wistful about "the vow, the ring, the kiss, the ketubah..." and eloping instead of dealing with all the fuss. Later, when the Navy Yard is seconds from exploding, Ziva refuses to leave the building without Tony. The bomb goes off while they are still in the elevator; Ziva and Tony fall to the ground, with Tony's arm around her waist, and their free hands clasped tightly as the elevator appears to crash.

Glasberg stated that the Season 10 premiere would "pick up with them in that elevator" and that there would be "some conversations". When questioned about the framing of the situation, he replied that their time trapped in the elevator would be the "trajectory" for a more in depth look at the relationship later in the tenth season. He added, "The consensus was to do more of that this season, to peel back some layers and find little moments — and [ever since then] we're finding opportunities I think the Tony and Ziva fans will really enjoy."

The tenth season was promoted as "Season X", and Michael Weatherly dubbed it the "Year of Tiva", saying, "This is the year. Trust me. This is the year." Cote de Pablo was more apprehensive and said, "I think that is maybe Michael and his wishful thinking. I've had years in which I thought, 'Oh my God, this a Tiva year,' and there have been years he thought were Tiva years…. The truth is, we have yet to find out where that storyline is going to go. I think they're toying around with us like they always do."

However, shortly after the season began, TV Guide announced, "In a November episode of CBS' NCIS, the origins of Tony's fascination with cinema will be explained — and strengthen his bond with Ziva." This involved him finding an old camera with photographs of his mother and later showing them to Ziva. Weatherly stated, "She was really the beginning of his love for movies and why that is such a deep, penetrating part of who he is. The last gift she gave him was to turn to the movies as a moral compass." De Pablo divulged, "We end up going deeper with each other than ever before. It's a profound, soft, vulnerable moment."

This was followed by "Ziva reminiscing with her partner about her dead sister [Tali]". In "Shell Shock (Part II)", she attempts to purchase tickets to the opera but is unable due to it being sold out. Tony, believing her to be going on a date, badgers her until she admits that she goes to the opera every year on her deceased sister's birthday, as Tali had wanted to be a singer. Unable to obtain tickets for her himself, he makes a CD of opera music and gives it to her to listen to.

In the eleventh episode of Season 10 and the first of 2013, "Shabbat Shalom", Ziva's estranged father Eli is killed in a house attack, along with Director Vance's wife Jackie. Glasberg discussed the ramifications that would be shown in the following episode, "Shiva", saying, "There's a part of Ziva that's wounded, and broken, and Tony is there for her — as a friend, and as a coworker ... We end up back in Tony's apartment, and there's some really lovely, emotional stuff that happens." He added, "You'll really see Tony be there for her and support her and emotionally be strong for her. It's all the things I hope that people who enjoy the Tony-Ziva relationship will look for." Throughout the episode, Tony attempts to comfort Ziva, taking her to his apartment as a precaution against the possibility of her being the next target and bringing her long-time Israeli friend Shmeil Pinkhas to stay with them. Near the end of the episode, he comes to see her off as she prepares to fly to Israel for Eli's funeral and assures her in Hebrew that she is not alone.

When asked if the dynamic between the characters would continue to progress, de Pablo remarked, "I have a feeling that they're going to want to play with that [relationship] a little bit more and see where that goes. I think they're always testing that relationship and they're always throwing things at it to see how far they can take [it]. It's already a very complex relationship. They're very close; they're very good friends; and they trust each other. So, I think the complexity of it all can go further and I think they're going to explore more." Pauley Perrette, who portrays series regular Abby Sciuto, openly opposed it and said, "I don't want any of our cast members to be in relationships on screen at all. I like things the way they are, so I'm not in [to] that. I'm petitioning against it."

"Berlin", set later in the season, features Tony and Ziva departing for Germany to track down Ilan Bodnar, her father's killer, with the help of her Israeli friend Adam Eshel. Before the episode aired, Glasberg disclosed that they would share a slow dance while there, resulting in "a very personal moment of vulnerability where her guard goes down and she lets herself melt into his arms". De Pablo added, "You also see [Tony] as a man Teddy Bear — like, a very sweet but manly man, a guy who's really taking care of a situation and really wants to make it better, a guy who's not looking for the joke or is uncomfortable staring at a woman or reaching out to hold her hand." This is highlighted in the closing scenes as the two of them drive home from the airport, and Ziva explains her animosity towards Orli Elbaz (Marina Sirtis), the new director of Mossad: Elbaz was the reason her parents split up. She tells Tony, "If it were not for Orli, things would be different. I would be a different person." Tony then takes her hand, and Ziva intertwines their fingers together. Tony replies, "Then I should catch her before she leaves, you know, and thank her." As Ziva begins to tell Tony something, the episode ends with a cliffhanger when an unknown vehicle crashes into them, leaving their fates unknown.

De Pablo described the filming of the dancing scene:

Michael and I crafted that scene. We felt the moment was very intimate, and we thought that just looking at each other was enough. And the director kept saying, 'No, I want the moment to be longer,' and we had to sort of fight the director. Finally, I had to say, 'Listen, if there was any more time of staring into each other's eyes, it would be like, cut to a hotel room.'…so finding the length of the moment became a topic. We certainly enjoyed it. I told [Tony] — without really realizing what I was saying and then I realized it came out the wrong way — I said, 'God, I felt a little drunk when I was staring at you.' I'm not sure if it was because by the end of the day we were both so tired or if it was because it was just such a magical moment.

Tony and Ziva reconcile in the Season 10 finale.

They both survive the crash, and despite being urged to back off by various other characters, Ziva ultimately kills Bodnar in the following episode. This leads to DOD investigator Richard Parsons (Colin Hanks) initiating a witch hunt against the team and Ziva being aggressively interrogated about her conduct in the aftermath of her father's death. When he accuses her of sleeping with an old friend while in Israel, Tony, who had been viewing the interrogation from the observation room, abruptly ends it and forces Parsons out. When he approaches Ziva about the accusation, she admits that it was a "moment of weakness" because she felt alone. This obviously hurts Tony, and he says, "My Hebrew must not be as good as I thought because I could've sworn when I dropped you off at the airport, I told you you are not alone". Ziva recalls this, and Tony says that they must have different interpretations before walking away. Despite this, he later confronts Parsons, demanding that Ziva be left alone and calling her his best friend.

I don't think so. I think there's a little more to it than that. I think they're sort of dancing around each other and trying to get a sense of how to move forward and, based on everything that's happened in the last year, where they are and what the next step is going to be. And, you know, we're letting it slowly percolate and build and hopefully get it to a place that's going to be satisfying for everybody.

— Gary Glasberg in an interview when asked if Ziva "friend zoned" Tony in the Season 10 finale

In the following episode, the Season 10 finale, tension exists until Ziva privately tells Tony that she is sorry if she hurt him during the ordeal, that she cares too much about their friendship, and that she does not want things to be awkward between them. He kisses her forehead and assures her that "nothing is awkward between friends".

Despite concerns to the contrary, Glasberg denied that Ziva "friend zoned" Tony in the finale. He explained, "It might not satisfy everyone out there, but I think we're getting there — she even reaches up with her hand and puts it very gently, and in a lovely way, on his shoulder before that kiss happens. I think there are gestures being made that have definitely advanced from where we were a year ago." In response to complaints about the pace of the development, he said, "There are a lot of fans who would like to see that story advance much faster than we're doing it, but I firmly believe a little goes a long way and there are ways to tease it and to flirt that are just as significant and just as meaningful." He maintained, "We made huge strides. Their relationship has evolved, has changed. They're a little more open with each other and a little more emotionally connected, certainly more than where we were at the beginning of the season. [The couple's closeness] may not be the big leap that a lot of people would like it to be, but I also feel like we're enjoying the pace at which this is happening. That's not to say we're not headed in the direction everyone would like to go, but I think we're getting there. It's very complicated when two agents who are working together get into a relationship, and that's something that [Tony and Ziva] would be very conscious of. So I think they would tread lightly, which is why, in theory, we're treading lightly and being very careful about the steps that we take."

On July 10, 2013, it was announced that Cote De Pablo would not be returning to her role as Ziva David for the upcoming 11th season. De Pablo stated "I've had 8 great years with NCIS and Ziva David. I have huge respect and affection for Mark, Gary, Michael, David, Rocky, Pauley, Brian, Sean, all of the team and CBS. I look forward to finishing Ziva's story." However it was announced that Cote De Pablo would return for the beginning of season 11 to wrap up Ziva's storyline. Show runner Gary Glasberg stated in an interview with EW that: "The amazing resolution you're going to see is pretty damn heart-wrenching and we're incredibly proud of it," he writes. "Prepare yourselves for a moment in television history. Images that will end up in the archives. I couldn't be happier with how my NCIS family stepped up and did some of the most emotional work we've ever done."

On September 24, 2013, the episode "Whiskey Tango Foxtrot" aired and on October 1, 2013, "Past, Present, and Future" aired, opening with the introduction of a new threat: Benham Parsa and also the Brotherhood of Doubt. Tony makes plans to travel to Tel Aviv to meet Ziva, but is forced to postpone them after being ambushed by the Brotherhood at his apartment. Ziva goes missing and Tony asks Eshel to help him find her. Eshel manages to track down Ziva's location but finds she has fled after surviving an attack, leaving behind her Star of David necklace.

In the episode, "Past, Present and Future", Tony heads to Israel with Eshel to search for Ziva but although they find no sign of her, they find a list Ziva had made of things she wanted to do in her life. After speaking with one of Ziva's childhood friends and realizing she had lied to them about not being in contact with Ziva, Tony confronts her and she admits that Ziva confessed to killing Ari to her. This devastated her, as she and Ari had planned to marry and she refused to forgive her, reasoning "Why should she have the man that she loves, when she took mine from me?", referring to Ziva's feelings for Tony.

Tony persists in finding Ziva using her remaining family contacts, and a few months later he finds her hiding at the very farmhouse where she was born, Ziva having gone to examine herself and her past. Tony offers to help Ziva recover from her past memories, first by helping her bury her list in order to write a new one. Tony and Ziva share their first on-screen kiss as themselves on the tarmac in Tel-Aviv. However, in 2013, showrunner Gary Glasberg told TVLine the characters had shared another smooch in a previous season, but it did not make the cut. The couple previously kissed in season 3, episode 8 Under Covers during a covert operation as married assassins.

Despite Tony's efforts to persuade Ziva to return to the United States and NCIS, Ziva instead chooses to stay in Israel, with Tony reluctantly returning to the United States alone after sharing a final kiss with Ziva, although Tony manages to find Ziva's necklace in his jacket pocket.

=== Ziva's presumed death and Tony's departure from NCIS ===
In the season 13 finale "Family First," after learning of Ziva's death in the bombing of her Israel home caused by Trent Kort, the NCIS crew mourn her. Tony is then introduced to his almost two-year-old daughter, Tali. Conflicted, Tony asks Mossad Director Orli Elbaz about Ziva's motivations for not telling him about Tali. Orli tells him that she wanted to, especially as Tali grew but that she feared he would not be pleased, to which Tony tells her "Then she never knew me at all." Later in the episode, Tony finds a picture of him and Ziva in Paris, to which Tali points to each of them, saying "Ima" and "Abba" indicating that she knew who he was, her father. Tony then gives Tali Ziva's necklace as a keepsake of her mother.

After killing Kort, Tony and Gibbs have a heart to heart, where DiNozzo informs him that he is moving on from NCIS, with his daughter, his family.

Evidently we have a daughter, me and Ziva. She knew me better than I thought. When McGee called, something hit me. I got this feeling, something I'd never felt before. In that moment, I didn't want Trent Kort dead. All I wanted to do was take care of Tali. Everything she had in her life was gone. Except me. I'm it. I'm everything to that little girl now. And I've never been anybody's everything before. But that's it. I'm done now. I'm going to take Tali to Israel, look for some answers. Then I'm going to take her to Paris. Ziva loves Paris. And you gotta believe what you gotta believe. [holds out his right hand as if to offer Gibbs a handshake] I'd say thank you but it doesn't quite cover it, boss.

— Tony DiNozzo, 13x24 Family First - NCIS

Speaking of Ziva's fate, Glasberg stated "Tremendous thought was put into every element of what you saw last night...down to the lines of dialogue, the specific wordage. At the end of the day, I leave it in the hands of our fantastic fans and audience".

=== Unfinished business and a family reunion ===
In the season sixteen episode "She", NCIS reopens a ten-year-old cold case when they find the starving daughter of a woman who has been missing for ten years. While digging into the case files, Special Agents Ellie Bishop and Nick Torres find that Ziva had kept notes on and had been secretly investigating the case after her departure from NCIS. Bishop wants to continue Ziva's investigation and keep it a secret from Gibbs, reasoning that Ziva would have wanted this, despite Torres' protests. While interviewing the girl's father and woman's boyfriend, who confirms that Ziva followed him for months before clearing him, he points them to a backyard building that Ziva had rented for years as a private office to write private journals as she coped with her job and life in America, though it has not been touched since her apparent death. Bishop tells Gibbs about this, who admits he suspected. McGee tries to contact Tony to tell him about Ziva's private office, and is told by his father that Tony and Tali are on their way back to Paris, where they are currently living, from a recent vacation and are unable to respond to his query.

In one of Ziva's journals shown during the episode "She", written during her capture in Somalia, it is revealed that Ziva had written about her feelings for Tony: "My heart saw him as if for the first time and I knew I could not live without him."

Despite Gibbs warning her not to get personally involved in the case as it could get her killed like Ziva, Bishop secretly persists in solving the case. After finding the woman alive and arresting her kidnapper, Gibbs forgives Bishop and allows her to fulfill her promise to Ziva to read a vengeful note from the woman's mother that Ziva had intended to read to the kidnapper. However, the kidnapper reveals to her that someone else had already read it to him before she arrived. Realizing that Ziva may in fact be alive, Bishop runs to her private office only to find an unsigned note from Ziva that says, "Eleanor Bishop, for the safety of my family, please keep my secret."

In the season sixteen finale, "Daughters", after Gibbs takes down drug dealers responsible for getting Tobias Fornell's daughter Emily hooked on opioids, Ziva makes her first physical appearance (not counting flashbacks) since her departure from the series, "Past, Present, and Future", to warn Gibbs that he is in danger.

During the season seventeen premiere, "Out of the Darkness", it is revealed that Ziva faked her death to protect her family from a woman named Sahar who wants to kill her. Sahar was involved in a Hamas splinter group with Ziva's brother Ari, and is seeking revenge for his death. Ziva speaks about her desire to return "home" to Tony and their daughter Tali, who she has been watching from afar during her time hidden. Her separation from her daughter since her fake death has taken its toll on Ziva, who now takes anxiety medication. Bishop worries about Ziva's safety, and is warned by Ziva's landlord Odette that if Tony knows Ziva is alive, he could be in danger as well. After taking down the organization in the second episode, "Into the Light", Ziva prepares to leave, telling Gibbs she has one more thing to do before she puts it all behind her. Before she leaves, Tony calls Gibbs, returning a call Gibbs made earlier. Gibbs assures Ziva that he did not say anything about her because he was not sure if Tony knew and wanted her to tell him. Ziva assures Gibbs that Tony will hear from her.

In the 2019 Christmas episode "The North Pole", Ziva and the team come to realize that Sahar is alive, and the woman they took down in the season's second episode posed as Sahar. Ziva reveals to Gibbs that she has in fact had contact with Tony. In a flashback shown directly after faking her death, Ziva tells Adam Eshel she is nervous because she knows Tony will come looking for her. Back to the present moment between her and Gibbs, Ziva discloses that Tony tracked her down and found her in Cairo, which was the last time she held Tali. Ziva states she and Tony have had little contact since, only when needed. The real Sahar (revealed to have posed as Gibbs' new neighbor Sarah) fights with Ziva, vowing to "end her legacy" by tracking down Tali and killing her, while Ziva retorts that Tali is "everything" to her. Sahar is finally killed when Gibbs shoots her in the head with a sniper shot, but Ziva informs Gibbs she did as he suggested when he told her Sahar is “smarter than we thought” and called Tony to tell him to go into hiding. Once at a safe location with Tali, Tony would then contact Ziva so they can reunite.

The following episode, "In the Wind", reveals that Sahar's son, Phineas, is missing. Gibbs gets deeply and personally involved, having bonded with Phineas over the first half of the season. Ziva offers to help Gibbs find Phineas, but Gibbs urges her to go to Paris and reunite with Tony and Tali. Ziva then confides in Palmer that she is uneasy that Tony and Tali would be apprehensive about the reunion, having been separated from them for this long and due to the fact that Tony has not contacted her despite her numerous attempts to reach out to him. Later, Tony sends her a video and pictures of Tali, proving they are ready for Ziva to come home. The team rescues Phineas before his kidnapper can take him to his deceased biological father's brother in Libya, and Sloane brings Phineas's foster parents (from whom he was separated by his mother), for a family reunion. Ziva then bids her farewells to the team as Palmer prepares to take her to the airport to reunite with Tony and Tali in Paris.

== Reception ==
Michael Weatherly and Cote de Pablo on the cover of TV Guide.

Over the seasons, Tony and Ziva's flirtation attracted much media attention, commentary, and praise. Maureen Ryan of the Chicago Tribune wrote that the characters' "love-hate banter gives the show extra zip" during Cote de Pablo's first year on the show. They have been called a "power couple" by Entertainment Weekly and "one of TV's hottest couples" by TV Guide. In May 2009, they were pictured on the cover of TV Guide Magazine and described as "TV's hottest love-hate relationship".

Fondness for the pairing led to a dislike for some of Tony and Ziva's other love interests on the show; by contrast, EJ, Tony's ex, became well-received after encouraging him to pursue a relationship with Ziva.

The pairing's slow progression was discussed by reviewers, and Ariane Lange from BuzzFeed referred to it as "their sexual-tension-ridden not-quite-love affair". Some viewers became frustrated with the show's seeming unwillingness to allow the characters to enter an actual relationship. Ryan expressed sentiment on the matter in 2009: "It's hard not to enjoy the chemistry between investigators Ziva David (Cote de Pablo) and Tony DiNozzo (Michael Weatherly)...It makes me grind my teeth with frustration that TV writers and producers are so averse to putting will-they-or-won't-they couples together." Executive producer Gary Glasberg admitted to feeling pressure from the audience to pair them officially.

The couple being romantically entwined was not universally accepted among viewers, and a portion of the audience felt that pairing the characters would disrupt the dynamics of the series. Matt Webb Mitovich from TVLine suggested that the dispute among fans over how far "Tiva" should be taken had left producers in a "no win" situation, saying, "Quite honestly, I think NCIS and show boss Gary Glasberg face a tremendously difficult juggling act with this (would-be) couple because it is TV's most watched program, and like a game of Jenga, you can't be quite sure which slight move could send things toppling. Is NCIS No. 1 because it metes out exactly 25 milligrams of romance every third episode, and never a bit more? Is there a fear that going all-in with Tiva will soap up the show too much?"

In 2010, Kate Stroup listed Tony and Ziva among Entertainment Weekly's "10 'Will They/Won't They' TV Couples", saying, "The chemistry is undeniable." In 2012, they appeared again in the magazine's "30 Best 'Will They/Won't They?' TV Couples". Similarly, the pair was included in BuddyTV's compile of "The Top 12 Will-They-or-Won't-They Couples of 2012" and TV Guide's top 15 "TV Duos Who Should Do It".

== See also ==
- List of fictional supercouples

== Notes ==
- ^Note A "Probie" is slang for "probationary agent" within the series.
