= NCIS season 7 =

Season of television series

NCIS
- Season 7
- Season 7 U.S. DVD cover
- Starring: Mark Harmon; Michael Weatherly; Cote de Pablo; Pauley Perrette; Sean Murray; Rocky Carroll; David McCallum
- No. of episodes: 24

Release
- Original network: CBS
- Original release: September 22, 2009 – May 25, 2010

Season chronology
- ← Previous; Season 6 Next → Season 8

The seventh season of the police procedural drama NCIS premiered on September 22, 2009 with NCIS: Los Angeles Season 1 premiering afterwards. At the end of season six, Ziva had left the NCIS team in Israel, returning to work as a Mossad officer. In the closing seconds of that season, Ziva was shown to have been captured and tortured for information about NCIS.

In the first episode of season seven, Ziva is rescued by Gibbs, Tony and McGee and upon her return to Washington, she eventually becomes an NCIS agent after resigning from Mossad for good. Much of the season's story are then focuses on the Mexican drug war and Colonel Merton Bell (Robert Patrick), a suspected murderer who hired the lawyer M. Allison Hart to represent him. Hart quickly becomes a thorn in Gibbs' side by regularly showing up and protecting possible suspects while they are being investigated, claiming that they were her clients.

The season draws to a close as Gibbs is later kidnapped by someone working for Paloma Reynosa, the daughter of the late Pedro Hernandez, a drug dealer Gibbs himself shot dead twenty years previously as Hernandez had been responsible for killing Gibbs' first wife Shannon and daughter Kelly. While Gibbs is held prisoner, Paloma informs him that he would work for her or she would have everyone he ever knew and cared about die if he did not go through with her demands.

It also ends in a cliffhanger with Paloma herself traveling to Stillwater and confronting Jackson Gibbs in his shop, leaving his fate unknown.

The series aired alongside season one of NCIS: Los Angeles, and the NCIS episode "Endgame" continued on the events that had taken place in the NCIS: Los Angeles episode "Killshot".

== Cast and characters ==
=== Main ===
- Mark Harmon as Leroy Jethro Gibbs, NCIS Supervisory Special Agent (SSA) of the Major Case Response Team (MCRT) assigned to Washington's Navy Yard
- Michael Weatherly as Anthony DiNozzo, NCIS Senior Special Agent, Second in Command of MCRT
- Cote de Pablo as Ziva David, NCIS Probationary Special Agent and former Mossad Liaison Officer
- Pauley Perrette as Abby Sciuto, Forensic Specialist for NCIS
- Sean Murray as Timothy McGee, NCIS Special Agent
- Rocky Carroll as Leon Vance, NCIS Director
- David McCallum as Dr. Donald "Ducky" Mallard, Chief Medical Examiner for NCIS

=== Also starring ===
- Brian Dietzen as Jimmy Palmer, Assistant Medical Examiner for NCIS

=== Recurring ===
- Joe Spano as Tobias Fornell, FBI Senior Special Agent
- Darby Stanchfield as Shannon Gibbs, Gibbs' deceased wife
- Muse Watson as Mike Franks, retired Senior Special Agent for NCIS and Gibbs' former boss
- Paul Telfer as Corporal Damon Werth
- Kent Shocknek as Guy Ross, ZNN news anchor
- Aviva Baumann as young Shannon Gibbs, Gibbs' deceased wife
- Ralph Waite as Jackson Gibbs, Gibbs' father
- Paula Newsome as Jackie Vance, Leon Vance's wife
- Omid Abtahi as Saleem Ulman, NCIS target
- Robert Wagner as Anthony DiNozzo, Sr., Tony's father
- Michelle Pierce as Breena Slater, Jimmy Palmer's girlfriend
- Jackie Geary as Susan Grady, NCIS Polygraph Specialist
- Jack Conley as Danny Sportelli, Metro P.D. Detective
- Diane Neal as Abigail Borin, CGIS Special Agent in Charge
- T. J. Ramini as Malachi Ben-Gidon, Mossad Agent
- Marco Sanchez as Alejandro Rivera, official in the Mexican Justice Department
- Jacqueline Obradors as Paloma Reynosa, leader of a Mexican drug cartel
- Meredith Eaton as Carol Wilson, immunologist and friend of Abby Sciuto
- Rena Sofer as Margaret Allison Hart, Attorney
- Todd Lowe as Chad Dunham, NCIS Special Agent

== Episodes ==
No. overall	No. in season	Title	Directed by	Written by	Original release date	Prod. code	U.S. viewers (millions)
139	1	"Truth or Consequences"	Dennis Smith	Jesse Stern	September 22, 2009	701	20.60
Part 4 of 4: The team struggles to move on and find a replacement for Ziva while also searching for answers related to her disappearance. The team believes Ziva to be dead, having been lost at sea on a cargo ship. Tony refused to believe she is dead. After Tony finds evidence, a plan is formed to gather intel and rescue Ziva. Tony and McGee are captured, leaving Gibbs to answer questions about his missing team members.
140	2	"Reunion"	Tony Wharmby	Steven D. Binder	September 29, 2009	702	21.37
The team investigates a bachelor party where all three guests are murdered and left in very mysterious circumstances. They zero in on a suspect, a police officer that had been bullied by the three victims during high school. The way that all three victims were found corresponds with the way they had tormented the cop, right down to shaving his head. They also discover that the three victims had used their Navy connections to set up the illegal sale of a decommissioned aircraft, and that the bachelor party was actually a front for the deal to go down during. Meanwhile, Ziva makes her peace with the rest of the team, and deals with her feelings towards Tony, as she apologizes for ever doubting him.
141	3	"The Inside Man"	Thomas J. Wright	George Schenck & Frank Cardea	October 6, 2009	703	20.70
When political blogger Matt Burns is found dead after being pushed off a bridge while following up on a tip, NCIS takes a special interest in his murder investigation. On his blog, Burns had accused NCIS of covering up the murder of a young Naval officer, Rod Arnett, whom Burns suspected of insider trading. Things become even more complicated when they exhume Arnett's body only to find that his body had been stolen. Meanwhile, Ziva resigns from Mossad as she wishes to become a full NCIS Special Agent, but in order for this to happen, Gibbs needs to sign a consent form. The episode ends without revealing whether Gibbs signs the form.
142	4	"Good Cop, Bad Cop"	Leslie Libman	Teleplay by : Jesse Stern; Story by : David J. North	October 13, 2009	704	21.04
When the bones of a dead Staff Sergeant turned mercenary are found halfway around the world, Ziva is forced to recount the events leading up to her captivity as the accuracy of her report comes into question. Matters are further complicated when Mossad Officer Malachi Ben-Gidon's arrival at NCIS threatens to brand Ziva as the killer.
143	5	"Code of Conduct"	Terrence O'Hara	Teleplay by : Reed Steiner & Christopher J. Waild; Story by : Christopher J. Waild	October 20, 2009	705	21.25
On Halloween night, the team investigates what appears to be the suicide of Lance Corporal James Korby who is found dead in his car. They soon discover that Korby was actually murdered as his organs were frozen with liquid nitrogen and, when he attempted to breathe, the nitrogen entered his lungs, suffocating him. They later find Korby has scar-tissue from a previous poisoning and Gibbs suspects that his squad-mates, fed up with Korby's jokes, attempted to kill him. Meanwhile, Ziva attempts to come to terms with her new role as an NCIS Probationary Special Agent while Tony begins referring to her as Probie, something she begs him not to do for her sanity but Tony continues anyway.
144	6	"Outlaws and In-Laws"	Tony Wharmby	Jesse Stern	November 3, 2009	706	20.18
When Gibbs' sailboat Kelly mysteriously shows up in the San Diego harbor with two dead men in it, Vance, Gibbs and Ducky travel to San Diego knowing this investigation needs to be handled with extreme sensitivity. It turns out Gibbs dropped his boat off to Franks in Mexico but Franks is nowhere to be found. Franks shows up at Gibbs' house with his daughter-in-law, Leyla Shakarji (Franks' deceased son's wife), and granddaughter in tow. The team traces the two dead men to a PMC run by retired Colonel Merton Bell, hired by Leyla's Iraqi mother Shada Shakarji to wrest custody of her granddaughter from Frank. During a second armed attempt by Bell's paramilitary to abduct the girl, Cpl. Damon Werth recognizes the team members (after events in "Corporal Punishment") and turns on Bell's men to help prevent the kidnapping. The team arrests Col. Bell who is extradited to Mexico where he is imprisoned for attempted kidnapping.
145	7	"Endgame"	James Whitmore Jr.	Gary Glasberg	November 10, 2009	707	20.96
When a doctor is found murdered, Director Vance shows up at the crime scene, claiming he's seen that type of murder before. The director claims the killer is North Korean assassin Lee Wuan Kai. The team finds that Kai has left her DNA on the victim's body for them. Meanwhile, McGee's new love interest who isn't what she seems. Note: This episode concludes a crossover event that begins on the NCIS: Los Angeles Season 1 episode "Killshot".
146	8	"Power Down"	Thomas J. Wright	Steven D. Binder & David J. North	November 17, 2009	708	20.34
Shortly after an attack on an internet service provider, the power to all of Washington DC is down. When the body of a Navy Armed Forces Entertainment worker is found at the site of the attack, NCIS is called in. However, without power, the team cannot use their modern electronics and must solve the case the old fashioned way. During the case, the team then reflects on how much richer life is without electronics.
147	9	"Child's Play"	William Webb	Reed Steiner	November 24, 2009	709	20.35
After the body of a Marine is discovered in a corn field, the team investigates at a military intelligence base that uses genius children to crack military codes. The team discovers that one of the children is making collages that contain codes with important military secrets that are being sold. Meanwhile, Ducky attempts to convince Gibbs and the team to spend Thanksgiving at his house, in spite of previously made plans.
148	10	"Faith"	Arvin Brown	Gary Glasberg	December 15, 2009	710	20.69
The team works to solve the murder of a Reverend's son and they soon figure out he may be involved in a hate crime. Gibbs figures out that it was the victim's brother who was the culprit, since he couldn't accept his brother's conversion to Islam. Meanwhile, Gibbs' father returns for Christmas and Gibbs tries to figure out why he has a sudden change in behavior right before the holidays. Also, an old friend of Abby asks McGee for a favour – her nephew (who is living with her) wants to see his mother for Christmas, who is currently on a Marine ship in the Indian Ocean, but only McGee can make it happen.
149	11	"Ignition"	Dennis Smith	Jesse Stern	January 5, 2010	711	21.37
Forest Rangers Jake and Mina find a body at the site of a forest fire. The team investigates and identifies Brad Sayer as the test-pilot who was flying a jet pack that exploded and crashed. Ducky discovers that the victim had been poisoned and was already dead long before his flight, leading to the team to suspect a third party. During the case, defense attorney Margaret Allison Hart appears, mysteriously, and tries to keep Gibbs from talking to her clients. Gibbs discovers later that the sly attorney was sent by an old enemy; Colonel Merton Bell, who was recently released early from a Mexican prison (after events in "Outlaws and In-Laws").
150	12	"Flesh and Blood"	Arvin Brown	George Schenck & Frank Cardea	January 12, 2010	712	20.85
A Saudi prince training with the Navy flight school escapes an assassination attempt when his chauffeur and car were bombed while parked on base. The team discovers that the prince is a less than popular figure with his flight instructors and is estranged from his older brother, an official at the Saudi Embassy, who believes his brother's "Western ways" was the cause of the attack. Meanwhile, Tony's father appears, and reveals he’s a business associate of the prince's father, leading to questions about whether Tony can remain impartial to the case.
151	13	"Jet Lag"	Tony Wharmby	Christopher J. Waild	January 26, 2010	713	20.22
Whilst transporting a government witness back from Paris, Tony and Ziva learn from Gibbs and McGee that there is a hitman on their flight intending to kill the witness. Gibbs and McGee work the case of a special ops commander, found dead by this housekeeper, who was supposed to be the hitman.
152	14	"Masquerade"	James Whitmore Jr.	Steven D. Binder	February 2, 2010	714	19.23
A Marine is found dead in a car which exploded after being chased by police and traces of radioactive substances are found on the wreckage. The team finds themselves in a race against time when a terrorist group threatens to detonate more dirty bomb in the D.C. area. As the team tries to track down the bombs, their investigation is hampered when Hart returns to represent one of their suspects.
153	15	"Jack-Knife"	Dennis Smith	Jesse Stern	February 9, 2010	715	19.75
Finding his Marine buddy murdered in an alley, Cpl. Damon Werth approaches Gibbs for help (after events in "Outlaws and In-Laws"). Gibbs learns from Fornell, who has been investigating for some time, that their suspect Aaron Szwed is part of a syndicate illegally trafficking contraband from hijacked semi-trucks, including expensive cars. Werth and Ziva go undercover as long-haul truckers while the rest of the team hit the road to track down the ringleader of the operation.
154	16	"Mother's Day"	Tony Wharmby	Gary Glasberg & Reed Steiner	March 2, 2010	716	19.62
Secrets arise when Gibbs' former mother-in-law Joanne Fielding (Gena Rowlands) surfaces as a witness in a murder investigation. The victim, a Navy captain, was involved with the same drug cartel that killed Gibbs' first wife and child. His mother-in-law eventually admits that she killed the captain in revenge for her daughter and granddaughter's death, and Gibbs' tells her he murdered their real killer as well. Despite the confession, Gibbs cannot bring himself to arrest his own mother-in-law. He convinces Allison Hart to defend her.
155	17	"Double Identity"	Mark Horowitz	George Schenck & Frank Cardea	March 9, 2010	717	19.58
Gibbs and the team investigate the shooting of a Marine and uncovers more to his life than anyone would have ever imagined. The Marine had been declared MIA after a reconnaissance mission in Afghanistan, somehow obtained millions of dollars, and married another woman under a false identity. Things get suspicious when the team realize that the other Marines in the mission gave the exact same testimony word for word. Meanwhile, Ducky reveals that his mother has recently died.
156	18	"Jurisdiction"	Terrence O'Hara	Lee David Zlotoff	March 16, 2010	718	18.00
NCIS and the Coast Guard Investigative Service (CGIS) join forces when a Navy diver seeking sunken treasure is murdered. Both teams suspect a wealthy doctor who was funding the treasure hunting expedition is the culprit, but the evidence just doesn't add up. Meanwhile, the similarities between Gibbs and CGIS Special Agent in Charge Abigail Borin amuse the team.
157	19	"Guilty Pleasure"	James Whitmore Jr.	Reed Steiner & Christopher J. Waild	April 6, 2010	719	16.45
Gibbs uses Holly Snow (previously seen in the episode: "Jet Lag") to investigate a murder in the world of call girls, causing tensions within the team. After finding the body of a murdered Navy reporter, the team finds out that he was interviewing a prostitute who used to work for Holly Snow and that there have been a string of similar murders. Meanwhile, Tony and McGee have a serious argument. When Tony works together with Det. Philip McCadden, McGee becomes jealous with their friendship.
158	20	"Moonlighting"	Thomas J. Wright	Steven D. Binder & Jesse Stern	April 27, 2010	720	16.29
When the NCIS team finds a dead Navy petty officer and FBI informant, they call in Agent Fornell to assist with the investigation. Fornell reveals that a string of similar security leaks have been occurring, and they trace the source to a private security company. They also discover that their NCIS polygraph specialist, Susan Grady, works part time at the same company. After retrieving her, the security company's office is destroyed in an explosion and Susan reveals that she stole some polygraph data for personal use. Abby manages to deduce that the killers inadvertently killed themselves in the explosion, revealing another party is involved.
159	21	"Obsession"	Tony Wharmby	George Schenck & Frank Cardea	May 4, 2010	721	15.10
DiNozzo finds himself captivated by a woman he's never met while investigating the death of her brother. The woman is the world-renowned reporter Dana Hutton, who has disappeared shortly after her brother's death. At first, the team believes that the murder may be connected with the siblings' work on investigating private military contractors, but begin to suspect that the KGB may be involved when they discovered Dana's brother was killed by a ricin pellet.
160	22	"Borderland"	Terrence O'Hara	Steven D. Binder	May 11, 2010	722	17.23
Part 1 of 4: After finding a dead Marine with his feet cut off, as well as a truck full of severed feet, the team begins to believe that a serial killer is loose. The team deduces that the Marine was the killer, acting as a hit man to kill rival drug dealers and kept their feet as proof. Meanwhile, Abby is invited to provide a forensic science lecture in Mexico by Alejandro Rivera, and McGee goes along as an escort. While there, Abby is tasked to solve an old case involving the murder of drug lord Pedro Hernandez twenty years ago, and Abby eventually realizes that Hernandez was killed by Gibbs.
161	23	"Patriot Down"	Dennis Smith	Gary Glasberg	May 18, 2010	723	15.96
Part 2 of 4: The team is shocked when they discover that a charred corpse found on the beach is fellow NCIS Special Agent Lara Macy, a friend of Gibbs. They discover that Macy's last case concerned the rape of Navy Petty Officer 2nd Class Kaylen Burrows, but it is completely unrelated to her murder. Abby confronts Gibbs about killing drug lord Pedro Hernandez in Mexico, and asks what she should do; Gibbs simply tells her to do her job and file the full report. Gibbs, convinced Colonel Bell is responsible for bringing Hernandez's cold case to Abby, leaves for Mexico after alerting Mike Franks with Rule #44; "Hide the women and children." Upon arrival, he finds Franks' house burned down, surrounded by bodies of Bell's men. Gibbs is then captured by Bell's right-hand henchmen, disgraced Army Ranger Jason Paul Dean (Dylan Bruno), who killed Agent Macy after he stole her original Hernandez murder investigation case files. Dean tells Gibbs that the body is not Franks, but is actually Colonel Bell. Dean knocks Gibbs unconscious....
162	24	"Rule Fifty-One"	Dennis Smith	Jesse Stern	May 25, 2010	724	16.30
Part 3 of 4: Gibbs' captor and Jason Paul Dean's employer is revealed to be Paloma Reynosa, the leader of the Reynosa drug Cartel. Her reason for abducting Gibbs is clear; she wants revenge against him for killing her father, drug lord Pedro Hernandez. She threatens to kill everyone Gibbs has ever met, starting with Mike Franks and ending with his father, unless he works for her. Alejandro Rivera is revealed to be Paloma's brother, who also wants revenge because Gibbs killed Hernandez for ordering the deaths of Gibbs's first wife, Shannon and young daughter, Kelly. Alejandro's attempt to reopen the case of his father's murder (in "Borderland") is complicated by the loss of Abby's report (from "Patriot Down") which has been intercepted by Allison Hart. Gibbs recalls his "rules" that Shannon started, circling Rule #13 for emphasis, "Never, ever involve lawyers," on the back of which he writes a new Rule #51, "Sometimes you're wrong." Ziva passes her test, but Tony and Gibbs are conspicuously absent from her citizenship ceremony. Tony, tasked with shadowing Rivera in Mexico, is intercepted by Mike Franks. The episode ends in a cliffhanger when Paloma travels to Pennsylvania and enters Jackson Gibbs' store....

== Ratings ==
Episode	Ratings			
Episode	Original airdate	Viewers (millions)	Rank	
Episode	Original airdate	Viewers (millions)	Night	Week
"Truth or Consequences"	September 22, 2009	20.60	1	1
"Reunion"	September 29, 2009	21.37	1	1
"The Inside Man"	October 6, 2009	20.70	1	1
"Good Cop, Bad Cop"	October 13, 2009	21.04	1	1
"Code Of Conduct"	October 20, 2009	21.25	1	1
"Outlaws and In-Laws"	November 3, 2009	20.18	1	3
"Endgame"	November 10, 2009	20.96	1	2
"Power Down"	November 17, 2009	20.34	1	1
"Child's Play"	November 24, 2009	20.27	1	2
"Faith"	December 15, 2009	20.69	1	1
"Ignition"	January 5, 2010	21.37	1	4
"Flesh and Blood"	January 12, 2010	20.85	2	5
"Jet Lag"	January 26, 2010	20.22	2	4
"Masquerade"	February 2, 2010	19.23	2	6
"Jack-Knife"	February 9, 2010	19.75	2	6
"Mother's Day"	March 2, 2010	19.62	2	5
"Double Identity"	March 9, 2010	19.58	2	3
"Jurisdiction"	March 16, 2010	18.00	2	3
"Guilty Pleasure"	April 6, 2010	16.45	2	5
"Moonlighting"	April 27, 2010	16.29	2	4
"Obsession"	May 4, 2010	15.10	2	5
"Borderland"	May 11, 2010	17.23	2	4
"Patriot Down"	May 18, 2010	15.96	2	4
"Rule Fifty-One"	May 25, 2010	16.30	3	5

== DVD special features ==
- The Future Is Now: NCIS Meets the Jet Pack - The NCIS cast and crew discuss the jet pack that was used during the Season 7 episode, "Ignition".
- Gimme Two Steps: Staging the Bar Fight - A behind-the-scenes at the bar fight that occurred during the Season 7 episode, "Faith".
- Celebrating Episode 150 - A behind-the-scenes feature showing the NCIS cast and crew as well as personnel from CBS celebrating NCIS's 150th episode, the Season 7 episode, "Flesh and Blood".
- Cast Roundtable - The main NCIS cast along with TV journalist Laura Spencer look back at the episodes of NCIS Season 7.
- Lucky Number Seven - The NCIS cast and crew reflect on NCIS Season 7.
- Personnel Effects - Associate Producer, Chad W. Murray gives a tour of how various items seen during NCIS Season 7 such as profiles of military personnel and NCIS agents were created for use in episodes associated with Season 7.
- NCIS: A Sound Investment - A behind-the-scenes look at how the soundtrack for NCIS Season 7 episodes was put together.
- Home Sweet Home: Creating the Gibbs House - A behind-the-scenes look at how the house of NCIS Special Agent Leroy Jethro Gibbs was created.
- Cast and Crew Commentaries on Selected Episodes (Region 1 only): Commentary on episode "Faith" with Mark Harmon, Arvin Brown and Gary Glasberg. Commentary on episode "Flesh and Blood" with Michael Weatherly and Robert Wagner.
