= Under Covers =

- NCIS episode
- Tony and Ziva undercover as a married couple
- Episode no.: Season 3 Episode 8
- Directed by: Aaron Lipstadt
- Written by: Lee David Zlotoff
- Original air date: November 8, 2005

Guest appearances
- Joe Spano as FBI Agent Tobias C. Fornell; Brian Dietzen as Jimmy Palmer; Michael Bellisario as Charles Sterling; Sonny Surowiec as C.K. Cord; Matthew Kaminsky as Henry Spivey; Michelle Krusiec as Maya; Phillip Rhys as Yussif; Eric Steinberg as Marcos Siazon

Episode chronology
← Previous "Honor Code"	Next → "Frame Up"
- NCIS season 3

"Under Covers" is the 8th episode of the third season of the American police procedural drama NCIS, and the 54th episode overall. It originally aired on CBS in the United States on November 8, 2005. The episode is written by Lee David Zlotoff and directed by Aaron Lipstadt, and was seen live by 17.79 million viewers.

Several recurring characters appear, including FBI Agent Tobias Fornell (Joe Spano) and lab assistant Charles "Chip" Sterling (Michael Bellisario). The episode, which was among the first to feature the character of Israeli Mossad Officer Ziva David, centers on an undercover assignment that requires Ziva and Tony DiNozzo to impersonate two married assassins when their bodies are found. Meanwhile, an attraction between them surfaces.

== Plot ==
When it is discovered that Sophie and Jean-Paul Rainier, two married assassins, who were fatally wounded in a car crash, were planning an assassination at the United States Marine Corps birthday ball, Gibbs sends Ziva and Tony to pose as the married assassins in order to find out who the couple had planned to assassinate and who had hired them. The assignment requires them to simulate sexual relations and stay in the Rainiers' hotel room in order to solidify their cover.

Tony and Ziva communicate with their supposed employer while trying to identify both him and the target of the assassination. When the camera on their hotel room is traced, the team is shocked to discover that FBI agents, apparently unaware of the Rainiers' deaths, have been watching them through surveillance. The FBI is initially furious, believing the case to be in their jurisdiction, but both agencies reluctantly agree to collaborate.

After the team finds out that the couple were expecting a baby and might have been planning to retire, they realize that the assassination plot could have been a set-up and that the Rainiers were potentially the real targets. Before they can be warned, Tony and Ziva are cornered, held at gunpoint, and tied to chairs for questioning. Their captors, led by a contract killer who is identified as Marcos Siazon (Eric Steinberg), demand to know the location of a disk containing coded information and funds.

In hopes of allowing Ziva to escape and despite knowing that he will most likely be executed for it, Tony claims that the disk is in their hotel room and persuades Siazon to allow Ziva to be escorted back to retrieve it. Gibbs, McGee, and the FBI agents are able to ambush the escort and rescue Tony before he is killed.

The episode is dedicated,"SEMPER FI. To Marines Everywhere."

== Production ==
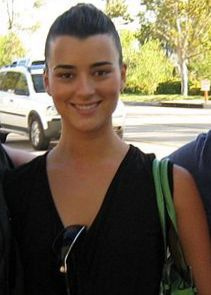
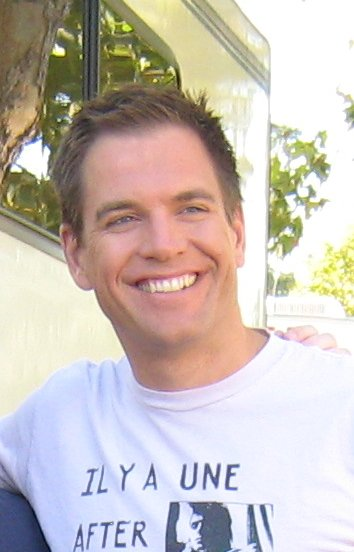
Cote de Pablo (left) and Michael Weatherly (right) portrayed characters Tony and Ziva, who went under cover as married assassins in the episode

The episode is written by Lee David Zlotoff and directed by Aaron Lipstadt. NCIS composer Brian Kirk created the 3:31 minute soundtrack used throughout the episode.

Michael Weatherly and Cote de Pablo, who portray the characters of Tony and Ziva respectively, have both described "Under Covers" as being among their favorite episodes. They have differing perspectives on the episode, though both regard it as the beginning of the characters' "Will They/Won't They" relationship. In de Pablo's words, "Michael and I talked about all of those scenes right before we did them. We had a totally different way of looking at it. In our minds, we thought the characters weren't faking anything. They just got carried away. Then all of the sudden after that, they saw each other in a different light."

De Pablo, who was new to the series at the time, said, "It's an actor's dream going undercover. You get to play characters within the character. [Weatherly] and I had to go as husband and wife and pretend that we were under covers. That was a lot of fun and working with somebody like Michael is a wonderful thing. My character has sort of this understated flirtation with Michael's character, Tony. She gets jealous, but I think she would never admit it or hook up with someone in the workplace. He scares her to death. He is the epitome of the American man and all of the things that come out of his mouth are brutally stupid."

Weatherly later commented, "This episode was so much fun to shoot. Cote de Pablo, who plays Ziva, came to me right before we were shooting the first scene where we kissed, and said, 'I've never kissed anyone on camera before.' I was expecting this timid little bird kiss, like a little peck, but she was like a lioness—she practically ate my head off! This is where TIVA (Tony+Ziva) started. We were told to really have fun with it, they wanted a sexy thing happening, and Cote delivered. I was just sort of along for the ride. And let's be honest, three out of the four letters in 'TIVA' are from Ziva, so what is the 'T' then? The crucible, is it the cross? I don't think so."

A similar storyline was later used in 2012 for the show's spinoff, NCIS: Los Angeles, when characters NCIS Special Agent Kensi Blye (Daniela Ruah) and NCIS/LAPD Liaison Officer Detective Marty Deeks (Eric Christian Olsen) went undercover as a married couple.

== Reception ==
"Under Covers" was watched live by 17.79 million viewers following its broadcast on November 8, 2005.

When Tony and Ziva were named among Entertainment Weekly's "31 Best 'Will They/Won't They?' TV Couples", the episode was mentioned as an example of how "the Tiva relationship has always been fiery." Latina published a list of "Cote de Pablo's 15 Best 'NCIS' Moments" and included scenes from "Under Covers" that feature Tony and Ziva "[going] undercover as a crazy-in-love couple".

The situation has been described as "a sneak preview of what a relationship between Tony and Ziva would be like" as well as among "the best ambiguous and not-so-ambiguous moments of their sexual-tension-ridden not-quite-love affair". It has been suggested that the undercover assignment was the beginning of a "spark of chemistry" in a previously "almost brother-sister relationship". Karen Barnes Yahoo! used "Under Covers" as an example when pointing out Tony and Ziva's "Tom and Jerry" interactions.

Michelle Calbert of BuddyTV named listed it among "The 10 Best 'Tiva' Episodes" in 2013, after the show had been on for ten years, and wrote, "This episode was like a Tiva lover's dream come true. When Tony and Ziva are put undercover as a couple of married assassins, they got to play out what many fans had been hoping to see since their first episode together. Though the sex may have been faked, it didn't mean we couldn't enjoy seeing them together as a couple."
