= Aliyah (NCIS) =

- NCIS episode
- Tony and Ziva's confrontation in Israel
- Episode no.: Season 6 Episode 25
- Directed by: Dennis Smith
- Written by: David North
- Original air date: May 19, 2009

Guest appearances
- Brian Dietzen as Jimmy Palmer; Michael Nouri as Mossad Director Eli David; Merik Tadros as Mossad Officer Michael Rivkin; Arnold Vosloo as Mossad Officer Amit Hadar; Omid Abtahi as Saleem Ulman; Inger Tudor as Dr. Sandra Holdren

Episode chronology
← Previous "Semper Fidelis"	Next → "Truth or Consequences"
- NCIS season 6

"Aliyah" is the twenty-fifth and final episode of the sixth season of the American police procedural drama NCIS, and the 138th episode overall. It originally aired on CBS in the United States on May 19, 2009. The episode is written by David North, directed by Dennis Smith, and was seen live by 16.51 million viewers.

"Aliyah" picks up following a cliff-hanger in the previous episode, "Semper Fidelis", in which Tony DiNozzo fatally shoots Ziva David's Mossad boyfriend, Michael Rivkin, in self-defense. It also follows the "Legend" storyline, culminating in Ziva's departure from NCIS and eventual captivity in Somalia.

== Etymology ==
"Aliyah" is a Hebrew word which literally means "going up" or "ascent". It is most commonly associated with Jewish immigration to Israel and return to the Holy Land. In this case, it is a reference to Ziva's return to Israel and her blood family.

== Plot ==
Despite Ziva's efforts to help him, Mossad Officer Michael Rivkin (Merik Tadros) dies in the hospital, having suffered injuries from his fight against Tony in the last few seconds of the previous episode ("Semper Fidelis"), while Tony survives albeit with a broken left arm. While Tony claims to have acted solely in self-defense, Ziva, infuriated, does not believe him and Director Leon Vance is doubtful that he could have fairly survived the brawl with a Mossad assassin who was also a member of the Kidon Unit. Matters are further complicated after Ziva's apartment is destroyed in an explosion, severely damaging the evidence and the crime scene. Gibbs approaches Ziva, knowing that the gas lines were cut and the explosion was intentional, and asks her if she knows any possible suspects. She deflects, even when Gibbs notes her stoic response, reminding her that it is her home in question.

Ducky confirms that Rivkin and Tony's injuries line up with the latter's version of the story and provides a reason for his ability to win the fight: Rivkin was intoxicated by alcohol. As tension mounts, Vance has Gibbs, Tony and Ziva accompany him on the next flight to Tel Aviv, Israel, having been summoned there at the request of Eli David (Michael Nouri), the enigmatic and powerful head of Mossad and also Ziva's father, while McGee and Abby stay in Washington D.C. to work on the case.

In Israel, Eli interrogates Tony, accusing him of killing Rivkin solely out of jealousy; DiNozzo in turn accuses Eli of sending rogue agents to Washington and ordering Rivkin to become involved romantically with Ziva to keep an eye on her. Tony later approaches Ziva, who viewed the interrogation, and tells her that Rivkin was "playing" her under orders from her father. She refuses to believe him, and he maintains that he had no choice in killing Rivkin. After he urges her to "take a punch" and "get it out of [her] system", Ziva snaps, knocking him to the ground while furiously contending that he could have chosen to wound, rather than kill, during the brawl. When he quietly asks her if she had loved Rivkin, she answers that she may never know. Afterwards, Ziva confronts Eli in his office, demanding to know if her relationship with Rivkin was real. He admits that he does not know, confirming Tony's assertions. He further states that he is no longer certain of her loyalty, insisting that she return to Mossad as a full-time operative and complete Rivkin's assignment.

In Washington, McGee and Abby manage to recover various emails and pieces of information from Ziva's laptop that allow them to assemble basic conclusions about the objective of Rivkin's mission and they also discover that Rivkin was in contact with Ziva. Gibbs, having gotten the information, ultimately decides to leave Ziva in Tel Aviv, hoping to give her time to "remember who she can trust" and consider returning to NCIS. The team is shocked by the turn of events, and Ducky notes that Gibbs took to Ziva more quickly than to any other agent before her and treated her as family. However, Vance confronts him shortly afterwards and questions the integrity of Ziva's position at NCIS as well as her motives for killing her half-brother, Ari Haswari, four years earlier to save Gibbs. Though Vance suggests that Ziva may serve them well at Mossad, Gibbs counters back, stating that if Vance knows Eli, then they may never see Ziva again.

Ziva is later shown having once again been recruited into Mossad and embarking on a mission to stop a terrorist cell. The episode ends on a cliffhanger when in the Cape of Africa, terrorist leader Saleem Ulman (Omid Abtahi) enters a room and asks a tortured Ziva for information on NCIS.

== Production ==
=== Writing ===
The episode is written by David North and directed by Dennis Smith. Before the finale aired, then executive producer Shane Brennan stated that it would be "jaw-dropping" and "stunning" and that the impact of the episode's events would "send shockwaves" through NCIS. He further elaborated, "We filmed a secret ending, and those pages were only in one copy of the script. People will see the finale and say, 'I know what's going to happen next in the first episode back.' Wrong. You don't know what's going to happen. People will go, 'Am I really seeing that? What just happened?' It really is exciting. I promised that with [the Season 5 finale] 'Judgment Day,' and I think we delivered. It is very much in that vein."

Fans had previously discussed the possibility that Ziva's relationship with Michael Rivkin had been "arranged" by her father, as was confirmed in "Aliyah". However, Merik Tadros, who portrayed Rivkin, voiced his opinion on the subject: "They could easily have been paired and had to be in love and then had to learn to love each other.... The way I've always approached it is that Rivkin loves Ziva. They've always wanted to add some suspense and mystery to all of it, but I would always say to the directors, 'How could I not love her?'"

When asked how Tony and Ziva's relationship would be affected, Cote de Pablo replied, "We could not be farther away from kissing. I’m telling you, it’s not 'I hate you' [kissing sound] anger; it's 'I want to kill you' anger. Like, 'I want to shoot you in the head, but instead I'm gonna put my gun on your knee' anger...He does something to her that is almost unforgivable. However, the reason he does it is that he truly believes it’s going to help her. Little does he know that he almost kills her...Physically and emotionally." Tadros was asked a similar question and responded, "I think that love can hurt and heal. In this case, we'll have opportunity to see both of those things take place. I don't want to say too much, but... I think it will only make their connection stronger, as they learn a lot more about each other."

Tadros further stated, "It gets pretty intense, without question. And it was very exciting, because I felt like it shed light on DiNozzo and David in a way that has never before been done in the show. It was nice to be a part of that."

The episode marked the first appearance of Mossad Officer Amit Hadar and the second of Mossad Director Eli David, who first appeared in the season's premier.

=== Music ===
NCIS composer Brian Kirk created some of the sound tracks used for the episode, including the pieces entitled "Ziva Betrayed" and "Aliyah", which lasted 2:42 and 3:01 minutes respectively. They were released on disk with the NCIS: The Official TV Soundtrack later in 2009.

Pauley Perrette's song, "Fear", was played during the scenes with characters Tony, Gibbs, Vance, and Ziva first arriving in Israel.

== Reception ==
"Aliyah" was watched by 16.51 million viewers live following its broadcast on May 19, 2009. NCIS was, as a result, one of the most watched television programs in America during the week of May 18–24, second to The Mentalist, which was seen by 16.82 million viewers. Compared to the previous episode, "Semper Fidelis", "Aliyah" was up in viewers.

BuddyTV listed the sixth-season finale among its list of "The 10 Best Ziva Episodes" and later among "The 10 Best 'Tiva' Episodes". Sarah Lafferty from Starpulse.com noted that the interrogation scene between Eli and DiNozzo was "a fantastic way to construct the playing field for a good season-ending conflict" but that the plot was slow at certain points. She concluded, "Leaving [Ziva] tortured until next season however, is a very interesting move that I highly approve of. Great move on the part of the creators. Not only did they manage to tie the entire series together (bringing up Ari's storyline in seasons two and three) but they left both new and old fans dying for more."

Brandon Millman of Zap2it remarked, "Season six of "NCIS" began with Leroy Jethro Gibbs successfully getting the gang back together... now the love triangle of death threatens to once again tear it apart. Can anyone or anything save Team Gibbs from another bout of separation anxiety?"

Some Jewish commentators discussed the portrayal of Israel and Israelis. Rachel Leibold from Jweekly commented, "While I'm highly doubtful that any of the show was actually filmed in ha'aretz, I did get a major kick out of all the Hebrew signage...There were also a couple of cute Hebrew touches - like Nouri's character saying "rak shni'ah" ("just a second") when Ziva walked into his office while he was doing paperwork. And in a sort of weird moment, goth forensic chick Abby, who didn't travel with the team, freaked out to Mark Harmon's character over the phone about how badly she wants to visit Israel - noting that it was 'No. 3' on her list of dream vacations, after the Galapagos Islands and Dollywood." Elliot B. Gertel of Jewish World Review wrote that the episode "focused on Ziva and her drive for integrity in all her loyalties" and that it highlighted her "sense of homelessness". He further referred to "the obvious bid to point to the dangers faced by the Jewish State and by the United States". Anthony Frosh from Galus Australis said of the storyline, "Depending on your perspective, this is either the classic dilemma of the diasporite Jew, or the classic canard about the diasporite Jew."

Reviewers also speculated about the identity of Ziva's captor, which was not revealed until the premier of the seventh season. Mandi Bierly from Entertainment Weekly wrote, "So who do you think that is, torturing a nearly unrecognizable Ziva (well done, makeup department) and asking her to 'Tell me everything you know...about NCIS'? Is it a member of the terrorist cell in Africa she’s trying to bring down now that she’s back working with the Mossad? Is it a member of the Mossad turning on her? Or is it a member of some other group that I’m not smart enough to identify?"

== See also ==
- Ziva David captivity storyline
