= Good Cop, Bad Cop (NCIS) =

- NCIS episode
- Gibbs persuades Ziva to recount what happened on the Damocles
- Episode no.: Season 7 Episode 4
- Directed by: Leslie Libman
- Written by: David North and Jesse Stern
- Original air date: October 13, 2009

Guest appearances
- Erik Palladino as Marine Staff Sergeant Daniel Cryer; TJ Ramini as Mossad Officer Malachi Ben-Gidon; Joseph Kamal as Captain Kassib Yosef; Todd Lowe as NCIS Special Agent Chad Dunham; Brett Rickaby as Steve Diamond; Stoney Westmoreland as Larry Diamond; Kwabena Darkwah as First Mate Bahir Numas

Episode chronology
← Previous "The Inside Man"	Next → "Code of Conduct"
- NCIS season 7

"Good Cop, Bad Cop" is the fourth episode of the seventh season of the American police procedural drama NCIS, and the 142nd episode overall. It originally aired on CBS in the United States on October 13, 2009. The episode is written by David North and Jesse Stern and directed by Leslie Libman, it received generally positive reviews and was seen live by 21.04 million viewers.

"Good Cop, Bad Cop" is part of a major story arc surrounding Ziva's captivity and torture in Somalia, her rescue, and its aftermath. Described as a "companion piece" to the season premiere, "Truth or Consequences", it reveals the events leading up to her being taken hostage by an Islamic terrorist through a series of flashbacks. The storyline serves as a catalyst for Ziva's choice to resign from Mossad in favor of becoming a full-time NCIS agent, culminating in the events of this episode.

== Plot ==
When Ziva's application to become an NCIS agent is denied, Director Vance informs her that, as a result of the discovery of AWOL marine Daniel Cryer's (Erik Palladino) remains off the coast of Tanzania, her account of Mossad's operation to take down Saleem Ulman has been called into question. Cryer supposedly deserted the Marines to become a soldier of fortune and was part of the team that Mossad had sent after Saleem. Ziva is reluctant to discuss the events surrounding her captivity, which become dubious when the Navy salvages Damocles and discovers that the entire crew has been shot dead.

Vance immediately takes Ziva into interrogation and presses her for answers. She protests that there are details she cannot divulge but begins to recount the operation: Cryer, under the name Shalev, negotiated a deal between the Mossad team and a Jordanian captain (Joseph Kamal), allowing the team passage to Somalia and discretion. Ziva later develops a friendship with Cryer.

Vance continues to pressure her for more details, but her team leader, Malachi Ben-Gidon (TJ Ramini), appears at NCIS demanding that Ziva return to Mossad's control. Vance agrees on the condition that Malachi debriefs them on the rest of the mission. Malachi relents, telling them that their cover had been blown and they were forced to kill everyone on the ship, with Ziva killing Cryer.

Aware that this would permanently bar Ziva from becoming an NCIS agent, Ducky talks privately to her. He urges her to tell him what happened, and she relents: a shot had been fired, erupting chaos on the ship and leading to the shootout. Though she had participated in the violence in self-defense, she had attempted to save Cryer by negotiating a truce when he assured her that he did not betray them.

Gibbs, DiNozzo, and Abby, meanwhile, deduce that Malachi is lying; the shooter missed twice at short range before hitting Cryer, illogical for Ziva. Malachi, by contrast, is suffering from an injury to his shoulder sustained in the fight.

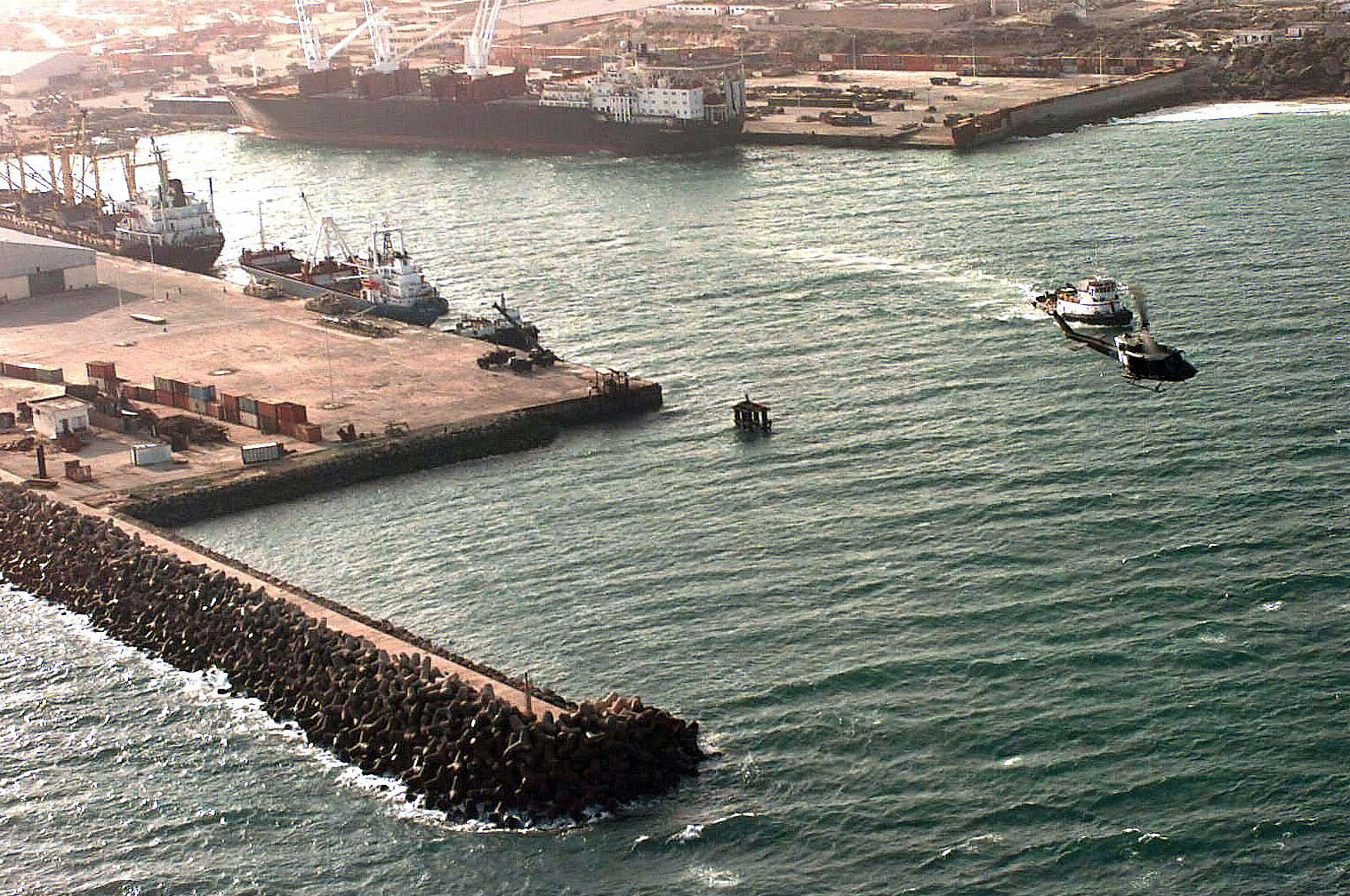
Port of Mogadishu, Somalia, where Ziva and Malachi arrived after the shootout on the Damocles

They forge a fake bullet while Ziva is brought back into interrogation. Gibbs confronts Malachi and forces him to face Ziva, who still cannot defend herself beyond denying the accusations. Gibbs informs Malachi that he is aware that the latter is actually responsible for Cryer's death, and it is confirmed through a flashback. He then throws Malachi out of the room, saying Ziva is "off limits". Ziva, in turn, realizes that her former team leader is acting under orders from her father, who opposes her leaving Mossad.

Gibbs encourages Ziva to disclose what happened afterwards, and she reveals that she had gone to Saleem's camp alone to protect the surviving team members, who were both injured. She briefly describes the circumstances of her capture and admits that she did not intend to live through the ordeal. Gibbs gets up, whispers in her ear, and kisses her forehead, causing her to break down in relief.

As the episode ends, Vance approves Ziva's application which results in Ziva becoming an NCIS Special Agent albeit a Probie.

== Production ==
"Good Cop, Bad Cop" is written by David North and Jesse Stern and directed by Leslie Libman. Flashbacks that are interspersed throughout the episode are set in various locations, including Jordan, the Red Sea, and Somalia.

On October 13, 2009, then-executive producer Shane Brennan discussed the episode's purpose: "We're filling in the blanks. In the audience's mind, we're filling in how she ended up being captured by Saleem, and the audience gets taken on a ride back to her time on the ship. It's a companion piece to the season opener." He added, "It's done in such a way that the audience will be kept guessing as to what happened. It's a very clever, engaging, not-to-be-missed episode...Certainly this episode will help resolve some — I won't say all, but some — of the questions that have been left hanging over the last couple of episodes. Those questions are in the process of being answered, and what you'll have over the next couple of episodes is a resolution of the issues that they've grappled with in the very recent past."

Cote de Pablo discussed the development of her character as well as the storyline's impact:

When you first saw her come in [during season 3], she didn’t really know who these people were. She finds this group of people and makes them her family immediately. And yes, she’s got what I think you could call anger issues. I wouldn’t say she’s gotten away from it. I think right now she’s gotten in touch with a lot of pain. I think she’s been sort of quote-unquote "betrayed", or at least she thinks she’s been betrayed, by something that’s very close to her, which is her family, particularly her father. And it’s a big deal to her. Which would explain her love and relationship with somebody like Leroy Jethro Gibbs...The fact that she becomes a part of this team and the fact that she’s officially an NCIS agent—as opposed to a Mossad liaison officer—is a big deal to her. But nothing really changes as far as the work. Hopefully things can begin to settle as far as her emotional stuff. Hopefully she can start to enjoy things a little bit more and maybe take a breather. But for a person like Ziva who’s been through so much, I feel like it’ll just take a little bit to adjust. In real life, a person that has gone through all that stuff, I don’t think it’s just from night to day. It’s just not gonna change that easily.

Mark Harmon, who portrays Gibbs, added, "She's back—physically back—though there’s quite a ways to travel yet. She's been through a lot, and her loyalty was really being called to the mat here. It doesn't surprise me at all that what [the writers] were doing with Gibbs is making him the last to the table. He perhaps cares the most. This is someone you either trust with your life or you don't, and it's that cut and dried for him. He's a huge fan of hers, but there was no loyalty question with anybody else on his team. What they do and how they trust each other is the most important part of the job."

Both Harmon and de Pablo noted that Gibbs had developed into a father figure for Ziva, a fact that complicated Gibbs' struggle with the issue of her trustworthiness.

This episode was dedicated to the memory of Robert James "Bob" Bryan, an agent with the real-life NCIS, who died at age 50 on September 21, 2009 from complications of pneumonia. He served twenty years as an NCIS agent before retiring. In addition, Bryan provided firearms training to the main cast members of the NCIS show.

== Reception ==
=== Ratings ===
"Good Cop, Bad Cop" was seen live by 21.04 million viewers in the United States, making NCIS the most watched television program on October 14, 2009. It had a 4.5 share among adults aged 18–49, with a share meaning the percentage of television sets in use tuned to the program. The episode attracted 2.473 million viewers in Canada and 1.84 million in Australia.

=== Critical reviews ===
"Good Cop, Bad Cop" received generally positive reviews. Allison Waldman of AOL TV praised several elements, saying, "First of all, let's get this out of the way quickly. This might be the best episode of the season. It was all character with just enough action to keep those who love gunfire happy. But most importantly, it cemented Ziva's place in the world of NCIS (the show and the organization). For that reason alone, this was four stars all the way." She went on to analyze the characters' behaviors: "Ziva has been carrying around the guilt of what happened on the Damocles for weeks. And there was the guilt related to her being captured by Saleem when she was supposed to assassinate him...Alone with Ziva, Gibbs wasn't [good cop or bad cop]. He was Gibbs. Gibbs the mentor, the commanding officer, the surrogate father...He kissed her on the head, like a father. That was when Ziva cried...and smiled."

Glenn Diaz from BuddyTV opined, "While the episode featured Gibbs and Vance heavily, it was probably Ducky who did the most significant progress on Ziva." Steve Marsi from TV Fanatic wrote, "For the past two episodes NCIS, while always superb, has felt like it's delaying the inevitable. Ziva was there, yet only in body, not in spirit. Her mind was somewhere else...The 20,000-ton elephant in the room – the cargo ship that brought Ziva to (and went down off) the Horn of Africa, was recovered, as was a dead marine who was on board."

As a result of Eli David's conscious decision to have his daughter set up as a scapegoat for the marine's death, many viewers began to see his treatment of Ziva as abusive and manipulative. This was amplified by apparent inaction during Ziva's captivity and torture; though she was assumed dead, it became a common opinion that Eli had left her to die in the desert. The image of Gibbs as a surrogate father figure to Ziva subsequently became widely accepted among viewers.

Viewers speculated about what Gibbs had whispered to Ziva in the final interrogation scene. In response, Harmon said that he had improvised the scene and that, "It's very specific, what was said. And the reaction and the read on Ziva from what is said is specific as well. Now, what I said or what Cote reacted to or how she found what she found for that, she's not gonna tell you any more than I am—I don't think. That’s our secret. And yet it's all about respecting the work and knowing each other well enough to really say, 'Okay, I'll go there with you.'"
