= Truth or Consequences (NCIS) =

- NCIS episode
- Saleem interrogates Tony in a prison camp
- Episode no.: Season 7 Episode 1
- Directed by: Dennis Smith
- Written by: Jesse Stern
- Original air date: September 22, 2009

Guest appearances
- Omid Abtahi as Saleem Ulman; Noa Tishby as DEA Agent Claire Connell; Mercedes Mason as Police Officer Heather Kincaid; Sonita Henry as Captain Rebecca Hastings, USAF; Todd Lowe as NCIS Special Agent Chad Dunham; Marcus Brown as Navy Petty Officer Dominic Dimarco

Episode chronology
← Previous "Aliyah"	Next → "Reunion"
- NCIS season 7

"Truth or Consequences" is the first episode of the seventh season of the American police procedural drama NCIS, and the 139th episode overall. It originally aired on CBS in the United States on September 22, 2009. The episode is written by Jesse Stern and directed by Dennis Smith, and was seen live by 20.61 million viewers.

"Truth or Consequences" follows "Aliyah", the sixth season finale, and carries the plot surrounding Ziva's captivity. In the closing moments of season 6, she was shown to be held hostage in a prison camp in Somalia and tortured nearly beyond recognition. The majority of the episode is told in a series of flashbacks that cover the four months in which Ziva was missing, focusing on the team attempting to replace her as Tony searches for her whereabouts. The episode ends with Tony along with Gibbs and McGee heading to Somalia to rescue her, bringing her back to DC.

== Plot ==
The episode opens depicting terrorist Saleem Ulman (Omid Abtahi) interrogating a captive in the dusty room of a prison camp in Somalia. The camera angle shifts to show that the captive is NCIS Agent Tony DiNozzo, who stubbornly refuses to give up any information. Unfamiliar with NCIS and Tony's mission, Saleem administers a truth serum and questions Tony extensively about the inner workings of the agency, how he was able to find his base of operations and why he traveled so far in his quest. Unable to keep quiet due to the serum's effects, Tony begins to recap the three months at NCIS since Ziva disappeared.

It is shown through flashbacks that the NCIS team began working a drug case in May after Ziva's departure and that they had not received any word of her. After a few weeks, wishing to move on, Tony and McGee approached Gibbs about searching for a replacement on the team. Gibbs delegated the task of selecting the replacement to them and again confronted Vance, still hoping that Ziva would return eventually. Vance admits that Ziva's father, Mossad Director Eli David, had not mentioned her to him and suspected that she was back in the field.

Tony and McGee interviewed several women as prospective replacements, none of which worked out for various reasons, eventually concluding that no woman could replace Ziva. In the present, when Saleem questions why they are not looking for her, Tony reveals that NCIS is under the impression that Ziva is dead. He further relates that in the months prior, he, McGee, and Abby, concerned that something might have gone wrong, had tracked down her last known whereabouts. They discovered that, while on a mission to take out Saleem in Northern Africa, a ship she had boarded had gone down in a storm and that there were reportedly no survivors. Saleem again questions the reason for his presence in Somalia, and Tony replies that he traveled to Northern Africa to seek vengeance on the parties responsible. It is then shown that Vance had given Tony, McGee, and Gibbs permission to travel to the region on the guise of searching for information. However, Tony and McGee were quickly taken prisoner by Saleem.

Saleem then demands that Tony reveal the identities of all NCIS agents in the region, and threatens to kill a hostage if he does not speak. To Tony's surprise, the hostage is Ziva, who has been severely abused whilst in captivity. Shocked and horrified to see him, she asks why they are there; Tony replies that he could not live without her. When he admits that he and McGee deliberately allowed themselves to be captured, she brokenly responds that they should not have put their lives and wellbeing at stake for her, urging them to tell Saleem what he wants to hear and try to save themselves.

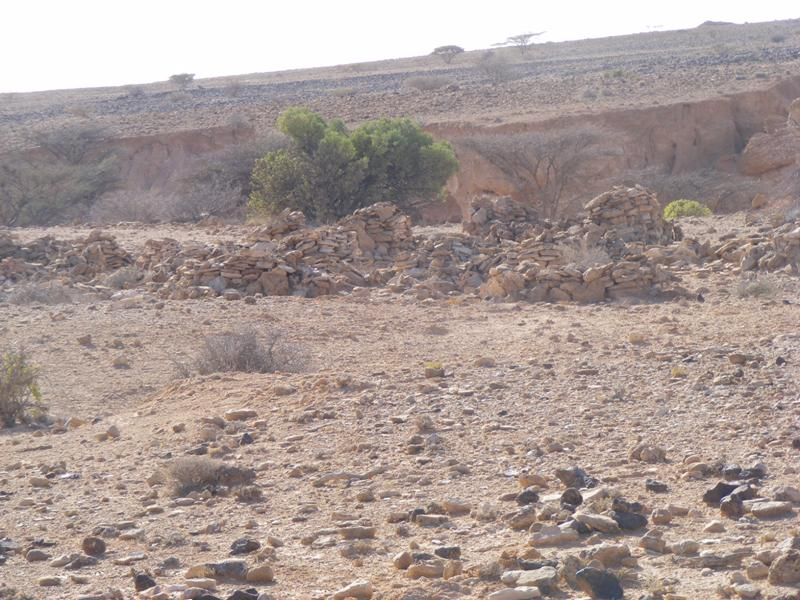
Desert in Somalia

Saleem returns, prepared to kill whichever party still refuses to speak. Ziva pleads with him to kill her and spare Tony and McGee, insisting that they are more valuable hostages. However, just as Saleem is about to execute Ziva, Tony cryptically tells Saleem that he has "thirty seconds to live" and refers to the fact that Gibbs was once a Marine sniper. Gibbs had been lying in wait the entire time, and just then takes a sniper shot, killing Saleem instantly before taking out the other guards watching over Ziva, Tony and McGee while American troops storm the compound, killing the rest of Saleem's men, and allowing them to escape. After they all return to the office, everyone stands up and welcomes the team back with a huge round of applause.

== Production ==
"Truth or Consequences" is written by Jesse Stern and directed by Dennis Smith. Much of the episode is set in a fictional terrorist training camp in Mogadishu, Somalia. Though elements of torture are used, most of the violence takes place off-screen or is only implied, and the episode does not feature any "extended torture scenes".

Before the storyline developed, then-Executive Producer Shane Brennan announced, "Something tragic will happen to Tony. Something tragic will happen to Ziva as well. It’s one of those arcs that has been building and building and building for so long that we decided it really deserved to be featured in a big way. It's emotionally and physically explosive."

Brennan later hinted at the events that would unfold in the seventh season premiere: "You cannot miss the first minute...You'll think you know what's going on, but then you'll go, 'Am I seeing things? What just happened?'"

Shortly after "Aliyah" aired, it was assured that Cote de Pablo's character, Ziva, would return, but that there would be repercussions from her captivity: "Cote de Pablo will be back next season. But she'll be a changed woman." Mark Harmon later remarked that viewers still worried that de Pablo would not be back, saying, "She loves the job and can’t wait to get here in the morning. Here we are in year 7 with this really terrific mix. That's what I would say to people in the summertime, when they'd say 'What about Ziva?' [As in, will she leave the show?] I'd say, 'No one is stupid. It took too long to get this group together.'"

After "Truth or Consequences" aired, de Pablo explained the purpose of the storyline and its long-term ramifications:

I've never shied away from taking this character to really dark places. It was the only way I could justify what would happen in the future with her, to show what she went through. Bad things happened to Ziva in Africa when she was captured, things that we probably won't really tap into this season. Things are different for her with everyone. When she returns, her loyalty is questioned - but, in this season, it will become very clear that she sees NCIS as her family and that her loyalty is really with this family, as opposed to her blood family in Israel.

Michael Weatherly (Tony DiNozzo) later cited "Truth or Consequences" as one of his favorite episodes, commenting, "In order to get that look of being dehydrated in the desert and sunburned, they put glue on my lips. Glue tightens the skin so you can't smile. I couldn't open my mouth, and when I tried to laugh I sounded like Doctor Evil meets Beavis, or maybe it's Butthead. In this scene, Tony's been given a truth serum, which means you’re getting completely unabashed DiNozzo, and it was hysterically funny that he was so relaxed. He was just tickled and amused by the situation, punky and very funny. It's not like he was trying to be bad ass—if anything he's thinking, if this plane goes down, I might as well enjoy it."

== Reception ==
=== Ratings ===
"Truth or Consequences" was seen live by 20.61 million viewers and by 22.53 viewers live+DVR in the United States. In Canada and Australia, the episode was viewed by 2.699 million and 1.97 million people respectively. The premier's ratings were significantly higher than the sixth season finale, which drew 16.51 million. Shortly before the episode aired, it was reported that, "NCIS has risen to TV's No. 2 scripted series, enjoying a 24% ratings spike last season (averaging 18 million viewers), surprising for a show so long into its run." Within a few weeks, the show became the No. 1 scripted series in America.

=== Critical reviews ===
Overall, response was mostly positive. Glen Diaz of BuddyTV called the situation "harrowing" and said, "The return to the NCIS headquarters was fascinating and sort of unreal, but all ended up well in the end. Then again, we know there's got to be no way that NCIS will split this team up - although I did have a scary moment there when Abby (Pauley Perrette) said she felt that Ziva was no longer in their universe." Sarah Lafferty from Starpulse.com noted, "Vengeance has always been the fuel for team Gibbs as well as a strong unrelenting theme of the show." Lafferty added, "'NCIS' season premieres NEVER disappoint. Even if it all goes down in only the last 15 minutes of the episode...The show doesn't hold without Ziva. I was as unsettled as Tony, Abby, McGee, and Gibbs were in the flashbacks. Bringing her in three quarters into the episode was no shock, but lit starter fluid for the rest of the season, and it's going to be all about Ziva."

Other critics praised the structure of the episode; commentator Michael Littles concluded, "Overall, this was a very good NCIS episode that is full of thrills, light humor, danger, and suspense. It was exceptional because of how the episode is pieced together: flashing backward and forward in time and not revealing everything that is taking place. In the end you don’t have a clue that a rescue attempt is even in the works which makes the ending a great surprise." Allison Waldman of AOL TV wrote, "It was supremely satisfying to watch them go back month-by-month to reveal how Gibbs, Tony, McGee and Abby were undone by Ziva's absence...Nothing could top the moment, though, when Tony got to look Saleem in the eye, referred to the movie True Lies, and calmly reminded the guy that his boss was an expert sniper. Then, from behind some weird desert camouflage, you saw Gibbs' eyes and -- BANG -- Saleem was gone. Gibbs took him out with one shot. On the emotional front, of course, Ziva is shell-shocked. She feels undeserving of the rescue, and when she returned to the office and everyone applauded the team for their mission, the vacant look in her eyes spoke volumes. Abby hugged her, doing what Tony wanted to do, but Ziva's not really all there yet. She's traumatized. It's going to take some time to get back to normal. All the more reason why next week's show is must-see viewing for me and the other 20 million who watch NCIS."

Michelle Calbert of BuddyTV later listed "Truth or Consequences" among "The 10 Best 'Tiva' Episodes" of the show's ten year run.
