= Ziva David captivity storyline =

Story arc of the sixth and seventh seasons of NCIS

Tony DiNozzo (left) and Timothy McGee (right) rescue Ziva David (center) in the seventh season premiere

The Ziva David captivity storyline refers to a series of episodes from the American police procedural NCIS, surrounding the imprisonment of protagonist Ziva David (Cote de Pablo) in a Somali terrorist training camp and its aftermath. Originally created by then-executive producer Shane Brennan, the story arc first aired in 2009 during the sixth season of the show and continued into the seventh season. Episodes followed the events that originally led to Ziva being taken hostage by an Islamic terrorist and the later effects of the event: her relationship with Michael Rivkin, the collapse of her relationship with Tony DiNozzo, Rivkin's death at the hands of Tony and the loss of trust between Ziva and the NCIS team as a result, her leaving NCIS to rejoin Mossad, her captivity and eventual rescue, and the ramifications of the abuse she suffered.

Elements of prisoner abuse and torture were used for the storyline, though most of the violence perpetrated against the character takes place off screen; producers avoided depicting explicit torture scenes like those commonly associated with the TV series 24.

The portrayal of Ziva's divided loyalties to the United States and Israel during this period attracted attention from several Jewish critics and columnists, who discussed its implications. Specifically, the actions of Ziva's father, Eli David (Michael Nouri), drew widespread debate, and his seeming nonchalant attitude towards his daughter's abuse garnered much criticism for the character. Within the series, it led to her decision to resign from Mossad and apply to become an NCIS agent and an American citizen.

== Background ==
The character of Ziva David was introduced by series creator Donald P. Bellisario in 2005 during the third season of NCIS, which follows a team of government agents who work for the Naval Criminal Investigative Service. Chilean-American actress Cote de Pablo was cast to portray the character, who underwent a number of revisions before ultimately being scripted as an Israeli Mossad officer assigned as a liaison to the NCIS team. She is portrayed as having a vibrant personality despite her background as an assassin and being "an extremely skilled interrogator, nearly impossible to break".

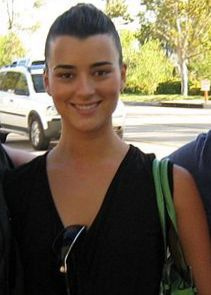
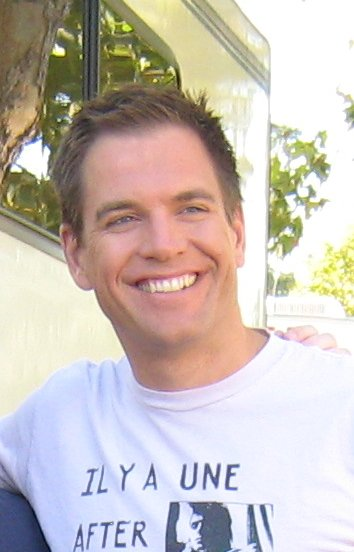
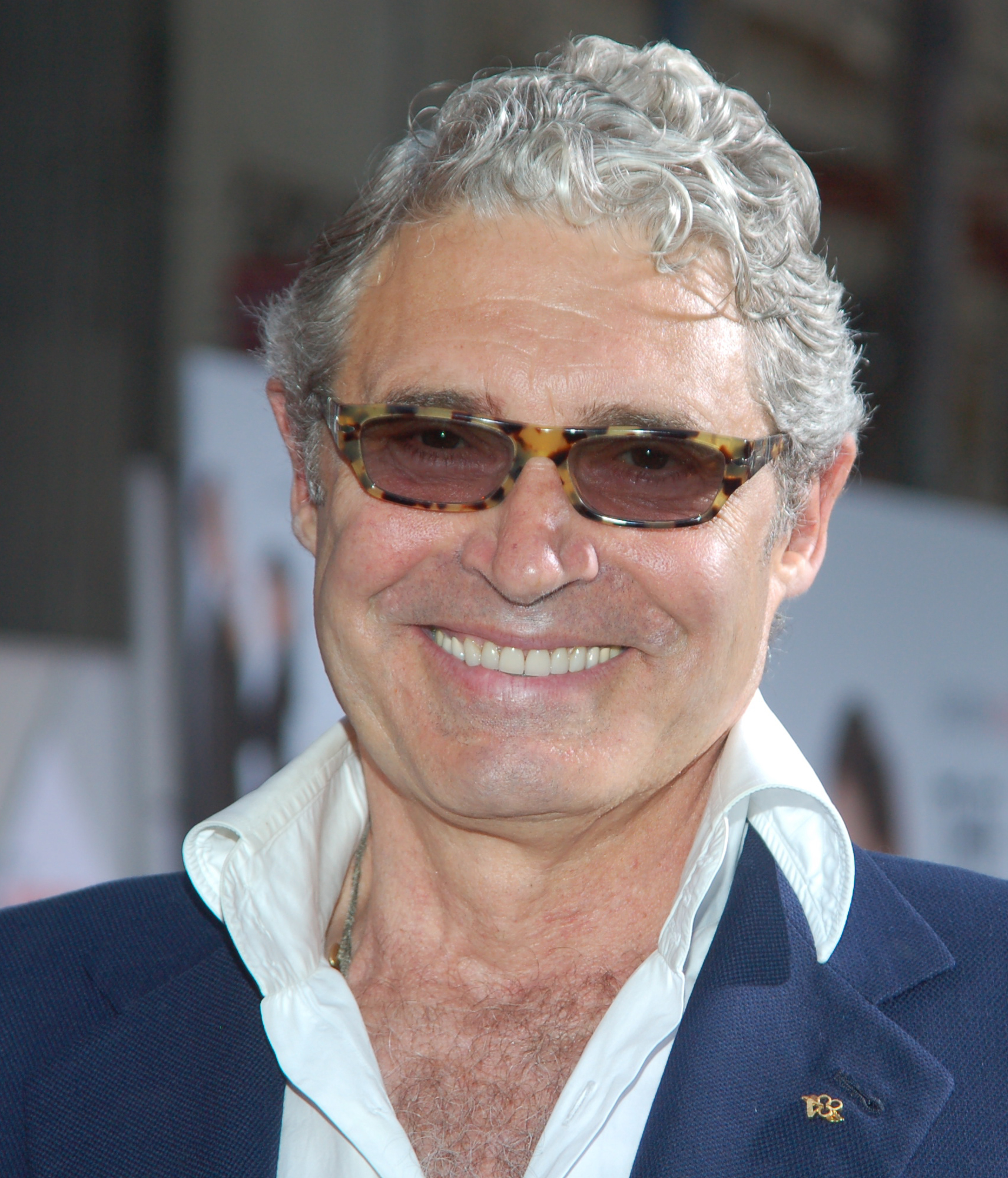
Actors heavily involved in the storyline, from left to right: Cote de Pablo (Ziva David), Michael Weatherly (Tony DiNozzo), and Michael Nouri (Eli David)

Initially rejected by most of the other characters, she is eventually accepted as a member of the NCIS team and as a surrogate daughter figure to team leader Gibbs (Mark Harmon). She also serves as a foil for Special Agent Tony DiNozzo, a former Baltimore homicide cop and "wannabe playboy" played by Michael Weatherly. From early in Ziva's time on the show producers began to toy with the idea of pairing them romantically, but continued to place a number of obstacles in their way (namely difficult circumstances and other love interests).

Ziva's upbringing is alluded in her first few seasons. She is depicted as having a somewhat troubled background with a difficult family history. Her younger sister was killed in a terrorist attack against Israel, and her half-brother Ari Haswari became a Hamas terrorist; she eventually kills him onscreen to prevent him from killing Gibbs.

Shane Brennan replaced Bellisario as executive producer in 2007, and in the sixth-season premiere, he simultaneously introduced Ziva's father, Mossad Director Eli David (Michael Nouri), and Mossad Officer Michael Rivkin (Merik Tadros). Their appearances catalyzed the events that lead to Ziva being taken hostage later in the season.

== Development ==
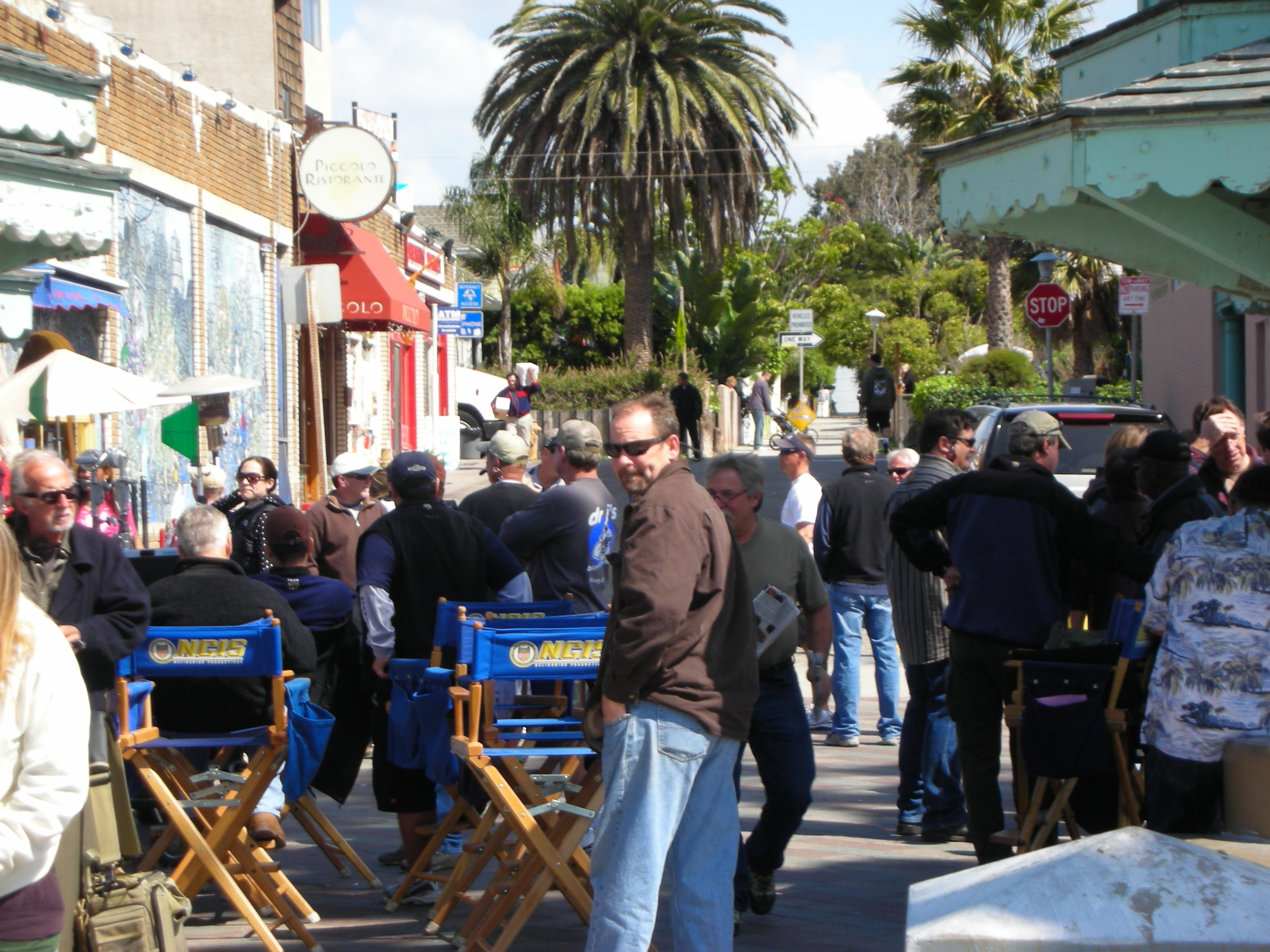
Filming of "Legend"

NCIS writers introduced Merik Tadros' character, Mossad Officer Michael Rivkin, as a potential love interest for Ziva in the sixth-season premiere, "Last Man Standing". After initial trepidation over how to move forward with the character, and an aborted idea of revising him as a relative of Ziva, executive producer Shane Brennan decided to script what he considered to be a love triangle between Ziva, Tony, and Rivkin for the latter half of the season. The story arc, which was planned to end in a "tragic" fashion, was set to cover the last four episodes of the year.

Brennan began the arc by writing the two-part episode "Legend" which served as a backdoor pilot episode for the spin-off series, "NCIS: Los Angeles" featuring the hunt for a terrorist; when Special Agents Leroy Jethro Gibbs (Mark Harmon) and Timothy McGee (Sean Murray) fly to Los Angeles to work with the NCIS Office of Special Projects — Los Angeles team to solve the murder of a marine, they discover that the killing is linked to members of a sleeper cell. Rivkin becomes involved and, rather than working with NCIS to apprehend the terrorists, kills the suspects, frustrating the other agents.

Back in Washington D.C., Tony starts to question Ziva's loyalty when she defends Rivkin's actions. In a confrontation between the two over Ziva's reluctance to tell Gibbs about her connection to Rivkin, Ziva asks if Tony's suspicions of Rivkin are fuelled by jealousy. It is made evident that Ziva is in a romantic relationship with Rivkin in the closing moments of Part II as the two are seen in bed together.

The nature of Ziva's romance with Rivkin became a subject of debate among viewers, and some speculated that it could have been arranged by her father against her will. Tadros opined that "Rivkin loves Ziva" regardless of the circumstances and acted accordingly from that perspective. Despite this, the relationship becomes more ambiguous in the last two episodes of the season as a security breach at the SECNAV's residence leads to the death of an ICE agent and evidence points to Rivkin. After going to Ziva's apartment to speak to her Tony ends up confronting a drunken Rivkin, resulting in a vicious brawl between them that culminates with Tony being forced to shoot Rivkin in self-defense when Rivkin attempts to stab Tony with a piece of glass. Despite Ziva's efforts, Rivkin ultimately succumbs to his wounds and dies.

The killing, and the ensuing events, generated some controversy among viewers. On screen, it causes a rift between Tony and Ziva, as well as a violent confrontation between the two in the season finale. Cote de Pablo described Tony's actions as "almost unforgivable" from her character's perspective despite their being in self-defense and stated, "I think sometimes when people make mistakes, they can be impulsive and judge someone on one particular thing. Ziva isn't overreacting—Tony did kill someone who was a big part of her life—but, at the time, she couldn't see clearly."

"I've never shied away from taking this character to really dark places. It was the only way I could justify what would happen in the future with her, to show what she went through."

— Cote de Pablo

NCIS Director Leon Vance (Rocky Carroll) agrees to a request from Eli and brings the involved parties to Israel. Eli interrogates Tony and accuses him of killing Rivkin out of jealously, a motivation that Michael Weatherly voiced to have been plausible. Tony, in turn, accuses him of ordering Rivkin to seduce Ziva in order to keep an eye on her, which he does not deny. Eli confronts Ziva about her divided loyalties between NCIS and Mossad, and after telling Gibbs that she no longer trusts Tony and feels unable to work with him, Ziva stays in Israel and returns to the Mossad as a full-time operative. She takes Rivkin's place on the Kidon Unit, embarking a mission to assassinate Saleem Ulman (Omid Abtahi), the leader of a terrorist training camp in Somalia. With Ziva back at Mossad, her position at NCIS is terminated and the Major Case Response Team is reduced to three active members: Gibbs, DiNozzo and McGee. Gibbs confronts Vance about the turn of events, insisting that he still trusts Ziva because of her choice to save him by killing her brother four years earlier. In response, Vance claims that she had only done so because her father had ordered to. The final moments of the episode show her to have been taken hostage and tortured by Saleem.

The search and rescue of Ziva was written into the seventh season premiere, but rather than show her in captivity, the writers decided to script the episode from Tony's point of view. This allowed them to shock the audience by opening the episode with Tony strapped to the interrogation chair, rather than Ziva, as well as keep viewers wondering about Ziva's fate. Brennan relayed, "You'll think you know what's going on, but then you'll go, 'Am I seeing things? What just happened?'" Within the episode, Tony, under the influence of truth serum, recounts to Saleem the events that occurred during the four months since Ziva's disappearance: the team at first attempted to replace Ziva without success. After becoming concerned about her continued lack of communication, they hacked into Mossad's database and learned that she had been put on the assignment to find and kill Saleem. Gibbs then informed them that the Damocles, the ship the Mossad team had taken, had sunk in a storm and that there were no survivors. Tony subsequently became despondent for some time until deciding that they needed to avenge Ziva's death by killing Saleem. This led to him and McGee intentionally being taken captive and interrogated upon locating the camp through the shipment of the fictional drink, "Caf-Pow!". In present day, he concludes that Ziva is "not replaceable".

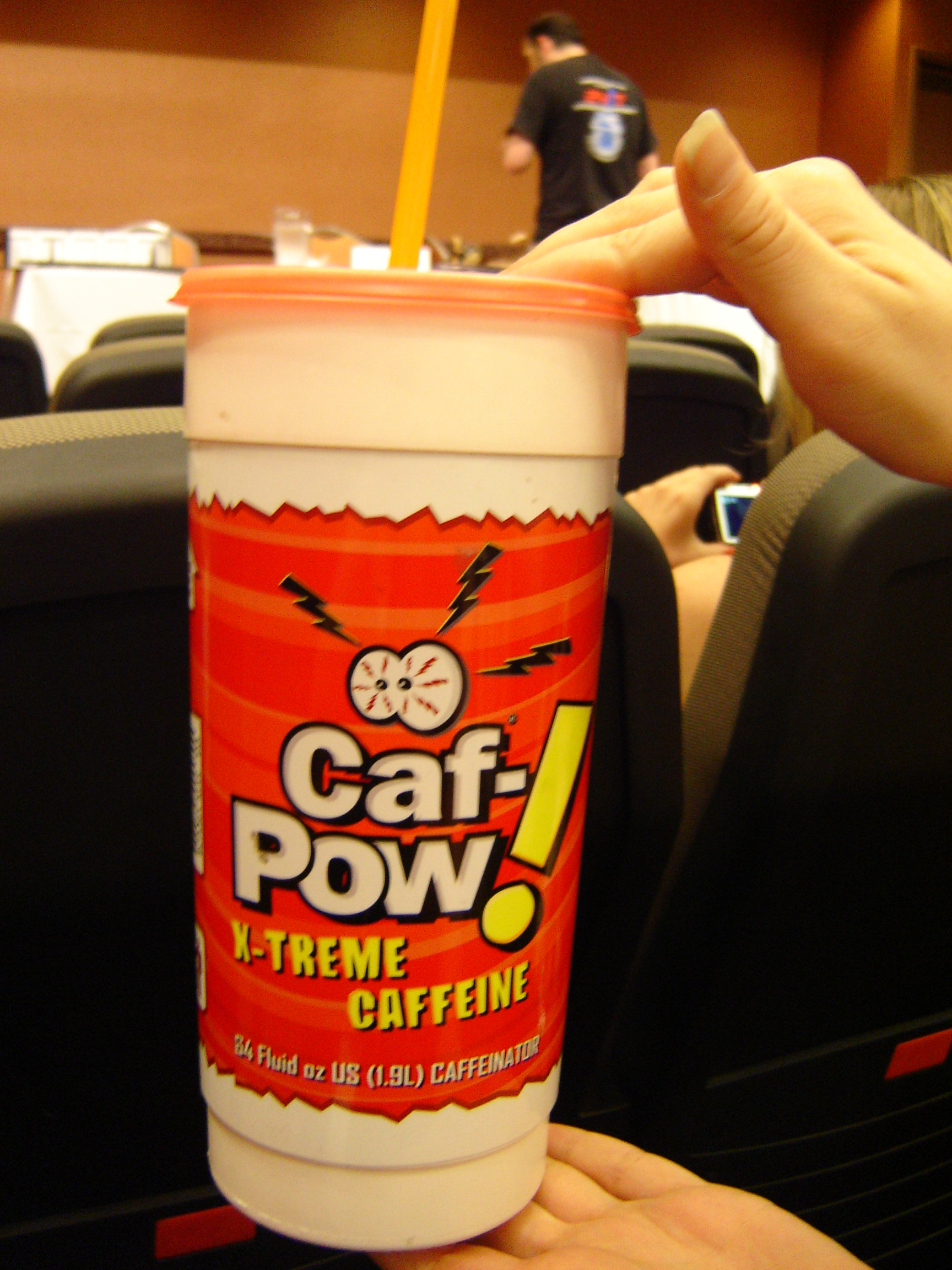
"Caf-Pow!", the fictional drink used to locate the camp where Ziva is held hostage.

An infuriated Saleem demands the locations and identities of all other NCIS operatives in the area, threatening to execute a hostage if they refuse to cooperate. To Tony's shock and relief, Saleem brings a bound Ziva into the cell, who is very much alive. Tension is still evident between Tony and Ziva after the events of their last meeting, even as Tony informs Ziva that he "couldn't live without her" (something that is later confirmed to have been reciprocated when Ziva's diaries are discovered in Season 16 episode 'She'). Tony tells a despondent Ziva that they have an escape plan, and Gibbs kills Saleem before he can harm either captive. The camp is then raided by Navy SEALs. In the closing moments of the episode, Ziva returns to NCIS with the team and is welcomed back in the office as Tony stares at her from across the room.

Subsequent episodes center on her recovery and integration back into the team. The other characters are at first uncertain of her allegiances, and Ziva herself suffers from the trauma of what was done to her during captivity. "Things are different for her with everyone," de Pablo explained. "When she returns, her loyalty is questioned - but, in this season, it will become very clear that she sees NCIS as her family and that her loyalty is really with this family, as opposed to her blood family in Israel."

McGee is perhaps the most welcoming of Ziva's return to the team, though he seems sceptical of Ziva's insistence that the past is behind her as she continually avoids speaking to Tony. She has a more difficult reunion with Abby, who (while happy to see Ziva) confronts her angrily about the breakdown of hers and Tony's relationship that led to her leaving NCIS and the accusations Tony faced about his motivations for killing Rivkin. After several awkward encounters, Ziva and Tony finally have a heart-to-heart in the men's bathroom where Ziva apologises for questioning his motives and thanks him for saving her life and the two tentatively repair their relationship. When confronted by Gibbs, Ziva assures him that she had in fact killed Ari to save his life. However, Gibbs continues to distance himself emotionally from her.

Producers used the storyline as an opportunity for Ziva to resign from Mossad and apply to become a full-time NCIS agent and American citizen.

Brennan had the fourth episode of the season, "Good Cop, Bad Cop", scripted to in effect "[fill] in the blanks" left between the season finale and premiere. In it, the team discovers that Damocles did not sink in a storm but rather was abandoned after a shootout resulted in the entire crew and one member of the Mossad team being killed. Flashbacks are threaded through the episode, mostly set on the Damocles, showing that Ziva had befriended a U.S. Marine deserter-turned-freelance-agent on board who was among those killed and that Eli later ordered her to continue on the mission despite the risks making her death almost inevitable. Rather than risk the remaining members of her team being killed, as they were both injured in the shooting, she opted to continue alone and as a result was taken hostage.

"The early episodes were a bit tense - he wanted to embrace her and bring her back into the fold but felt the need to be standoffish. Will he be someone she can trust, implicitly? Absolutely, without doubt. Will he ever be the warm and fuzzy big fluffy teddy bear in the corner? No, not a chance. At the end of the day, Gibbs is a realist."

— Mark Harmon on Gibbs and Ziva

She becomes a suspect for the marine's death when Eli, in an attempt to prevent her from leaving Mossad, orders her former team leader, Malachi Ben Gidon, who had been on the mission with her, to accuse her of being responsible for the killing. After she is proven innocent, Gibbs angrily states that Ziva is "off limits" to Eli. They reconcile, with Ziva relaying the rest of what happened up to being taken captive. Gibbs then whispers something in her ear and kisses her forehead as she breaks down crying.

Mark Harmon explained that Gibbs, despite being "a huge fan of hers" and the character who "perhaps cares the most" about Ziva, had to be wary of her in the beginning due to the question of loyalty. He improvised the final moments of the characters' reconciliation, and what Gibbs whispered to her became a subject of discussion among viewers. Likewise, de Pablo's reaction to it was not scripted either. Harmon declined to divulge what was said, stating, "That's our secret." These events propelled the idea of Gibbs as a surrogate father figure to Ziva, marking the first time it was verbally acknowledged within the series. (Note: Ziva calls Gibbs "the closest thing [she has] to a father" in "Reunion", the second episode of Season 7.)

Following "Good Cop, Bad Cop", Ziva's attempts to gain American citizenship became the main subplot while her captivity is only mentioned in passing throughout the rest of Season 7 and into Season 8. To assure the audience that the seriousness of the character's trauma had not been overlooked, a February episode had her briefly discuss the experience with Tony. "In true NCIS fashion, it's never quite addressed..." de Pablo said. "The way it was written was sort of glazed over, but it was so there. We're constantly being bombarded with new information, or else the characters just wouldn't grow or go anywhere." Ziva is uncomfortable when Tony recommends picking the lock of a warehouse to search it without a warrant, reasoning that doing so would help them solve the case more quickly. She explains that when she was in Somalia, Saleem would regularly attempt to justify his crimes by claiming that he committed them to protect his way of life.

Afterwards, the subject is alluded to during specific cases, such as when the team deals with a rape victim at the end of Season 7 and an abused wife in the middle of Season 8. In the latter case, Head Medical Examiner Ducky Mallard (David McCallum) suggests that Gibbs have Ziva be the one to confront the woman, saying, "Agent David has been through things you and I can't even imagine, and she knows what it's like to be controlled." Michael Nouri was brought back to guest star as Eli David during the eighth season, and the consequences of his actions are addressed. Ziva is able to forgive him somewhat, and he tries to reach a full reconciliation in Season 10's "Shabbat Shalom". However, he is killed in a targeted shooting before he is able to make peace with his daughter, greatly devastating Ziva and prompting her to embark on a campaign of revenge against the man responsible: Ilan Bodnar.

== Use of torture ==
Ziva's ordeal in Somalia included being tortured by Saleem and his men, but the producers avoided depicting it graphically. Shane Brennan wrote a cliffhanger for the season finale that briefly shows her in the aftermath of an evidently brutal interrogation; in it, she is limp and tied to a chair, bloody and bruised. Makeup specialists were able to use a significant amount of cosmetics on de Pablo to make her face "nearly unrecognizable". The torturer, later identified as Saleem, casually returns to her cell, rips off her Star of David pendant, and demands that she tell him what she knows about NCIS. She does not appear again until her rescue in the Season 7 premiere, where she is hooded, "ready to die", and unable to walk on her own.

Tony and McGee are both later captured by Saleem on purpose as part of the operation to take down the terrorist prison camp. They suffer an initial beating on being taken hostage, but neither are shown being subjected to torture for information. As the entire premiere is set during Tony's interrogation, NCIS writers opted to script Saleem as injecting Tony with truth serum as a means of obtaining information from him. Glue, which tightens the skin, was put on the actors' lips to effectively make all three characters look sunburned and dehydrated.

The specifics of Ziva's abuse are not discussed following her rescue, and, within the series, the other characters only refer to it vaguely. For example, Vance tells Gibbs that "Saleem's men put a world of hurt on her" and Ducky states that "she went through far more than [they] originally suspected". Though an episode was filmed to clear some of the questions by showing the events that led up to her captivity, it did not delve into her time as a hostage and de Pablo later confirmed that the ambiguity of what had happened during those four months was intentional. Viewers began to speculate that Ziva had been raped while in captivity and questioned whether the plot was too dark for a primetime drama to explore in depth. De Pablo did not comment on the subject of her character's ordeal except to affirm that Saleem and his men did "bad things" to Ziva and to suggest that she had suppressed her feelings regarding the trauma in its aftermath.

== Impact and significance ==
=== Personality of Ziva David ===
When first introduced to the series, Ziva is "a cocky, young kid who thinks she knows it all and thinks that nothing can really touch her [or] beat her". She maintains this demeanor over the next several seasons despite some of the hardships she endures, such as killing her brother and seeing a love interest die from radiation poisoning. During the summer prior to the seventh season, NCIS producers divulged that Ziva would be "a changed woman" after her experiences in Somalia. This manifests in her being written as a softer, more subdued character, and, in the words of Cote de Pablo, "more inclined to listen before acting out".

The changes to her personality were not universally welcomed. De Pablo herself preferred the more wild and reckless version of Ziva and eventually began to request that she be allowed to return to some of her pre-Somalia behavior. Gary Glasberg, who took over as executive producer for Shane Brennan in 2011, gave her that opportunity in the latter half of the tenth season, which focused on Ziva's attempts to get revenge for her father's assassination.

=== Eli David ===
The actions of Eli David, both before and after Ziva's captivity, and the extent of their reflection on Israel and Mossad as a whole became a controversial matter during the course of the storyline. The situation was made more sordid when the new season revealed that Eli had ordered her to continue on her assignment, even after it became clear that her chances of survival were slim; to make matters worse, he failed to rescue his daughter after she had been taken captive by the Somali terrorists. Rabbi Elliot B. Gertel wrote:

What does this say about Israel and about the Israeli family, besides the obvious bid to point to the dangers faced by the Jewish State and by the United States? From the vantage point of the NCIS writers, do Israelis, or at least some Israelis, sacrifice their children to protect them, or purposefully spawn dysfunctional families for the sake of the state? Maybe the NCIS staff will answer these questions next season.

Harvard academic Eitan Kensky also weighed in on the matter:

Instead of the weak, mother-obsessed Jewish male, we have a trained assassin psychologically scarred by her father...For all her strength, she cannot be strong on her own. She demands recognition and validation from paternalistic men in order to justify her life...If it seemed that Ziva's conflict was between two countries, she was actually torn between two men: her father, a major Mossad figure, and Gibbs. After learning her father set her up, she was adrift, not a part of NCIS or Mossad. That is, until she and Gibbs reconciled. "He raised you to be a ruthless, soulless killer," Gibbs tells her, then he whispers something in her ear, and kisses her hair as she starts crying.

Cote de Pablo, who has been to Israel, considered Eli to be a sympathetic character despite his transgressions, explaining, "These characters are able to justify [their actions] because they come from a country that's at war." However, she also considered Ziva's anger to be justifiable as well, as her father "[sent] her away on, basically, what I would call a suicide mission". Within the series, Ziva is able to partially reconcile with Eli and reach an "unspoken forgiveness" for him in the eighth season, but the show's writers did not begin to redeem his character until shortly before his death in the tenth-season episode "Shabbat Shalom".

=== Diplomatic relations between Israel and the United States ===
If Bibi [Netanyahu] comes to visit the White House, and he appears as Ziva, the US-Israeli relationship under the new Obama administration will be enhanced. But if he's Michael, then the highly celebrated Washington-Jerusalem connection is in for some tough times indeed.

— Steven L. Spiegel, Director of the Center for Middle East Development and Professor of Political Science, UCLA

During the first few seasons, storylines related to Israel focus on the "peculiar arrangement" between the agencies "in which the brilliant daughter of the head of Mossad (Ziva David) has been embedded in the American NCIS". For example, the Season 4 premiere involves a plot surrounding Iranian agents framing Ziva, and by extension Israel, for the murder of two FBI agents and a terrorist in their custody. Situations are made more complicated due to her being "stigmatized as the (half) sister of a Hamas terrorist killer". In general, the show avoids creating black-and-white portrayals of the Israeli people; Mossad agents are depicted as effective with justified motivations, but the series has introduced "bad" Israelis, most prominently a rogue Mossad officer who participates in the framing of Ziva in Season 4. Ziva herself is a sympathetic figure who is "unashamedly Jewish" and proud of being Israeli, though she is often more ruthless than her colleagues at NCIS.

The captivity storylines took a different route by using the characters of Ziva and Michael Rivkin to symbolize the "two Israels American policy makers have faced over the years". Ziva is "the cooperative and quiet Israeli, who has the technical and personal skills to be of enormous assistance in achieving the mission" while Rivkin is "bright and pro-American, but in this case tough, aggressive, thinks he knows what is best for the United States better than the Americans, is sly and wily, and he doesn't heed the advice of his American counterparts". Both are received differently by the American agents—Ziva is respected and trusted by her colleagues; Rivkin is an object of suspicion. Steven L. Spiegel, Director of the Center for Middle East Development and Professor of Political Science at the University of California, Los Angeles (UCLA), drew parallels between their interactions with their American counterparts and those of prominent Israeli politicians. Ziva, he reasoned, could be likened to Shimon Peres, Yitzhak Rabin, or Ehud Olmert in that she is able to agree with the American agencies on a more basic, fundamental level. Rivkin, he continued, was more like Yitzhak Shamir.

NCIS writers continued to present the Israeli personalities as capable and justified, though Spiegel suggested that they "[were] too affected by their tragic past".

== Reception ==
The first four of the arc's eight episodes average between 16.20 and 16.72 million viewers while the last four all maintained over 20 million following their broadcast. Despite the controversial aspects, the storyline received generally positive reviews, with it being called "harrowing" and "fantastic". Response for "Truth or Consequences", the seventh season premiere, was particularly favorable, and it was later listed among BuddyTV's "10 Best [Tony and Ziva] episodes". Allison Waldman from AOL summarized the execution of the characters' search for and rescue of Ziva:

It was supremely satisfying to watch them go back month-by-month to reveal how Gibbs, Tony, McGee and Abby were undone by Ziva's absence...Nothing could top the moment, though, when Tony got to look Saleem in the eye, referred to the movie True Lies, and calmly reminded the guy that his boss was an expert sniper. Then, from behind some weird desert camouflage, you saw Gibbs' eyes and -- BANG -- Saleem was gone. Gibbs took him out with one shot. On the emotional front, of course, Ziva is shell-shocked. She feels undeserving of the rescue, and when she returned to the office and everyone applauded the team for their mission, the vacant look in her eyes spoke volumes. Abby hugged her, doing what Tony wanted to do, but Ziva's not really all there yet. She's traumatized. It's going to take some time to get back to normal. All the more reason why next week's show is must-see viewing for me and the other 20 million who watch NCIS.

Viewers disliked the character of Michael Rivkin, partly due to an attachment to the "will they/won't they" relationship between Tony and Ziva. Zap2it's Brandon Millman referred to the three of them as "the love triangle of death".

A portion of the audience criticized the writers for not directly confronting what Ziva had endured in captivity, believing that in doing so they had not properly addressed her trauma. When the Season 8 episode focusing on domestic abuse aired, Steve Marsi from TV Fanatic commented, "What was most intriguing about the case was not the evidence or the unfolding mystery but the fact that this powerful woman, a Marine martial arts trainer, was an abuse victim. Sounds like someone we know. Ziva opened up to Georgia about similar abuse she suffered and made some inroads, although this could have been extrapolated upon further. It seemed like a prime opportunity for Ziva's character to shine - relating to a suspect similarly strong, powerful, yet vulnerable - but the plot quickly moved in other directions." There were also complaints about the choice to partially rewrite the details of the earlier storyline surrounding Ziva's killing of her brother, which had served as her introduction to the series.

== Similar use in NCIS: Los Angeles ==
Executive producer Shane Brennan left NCIS to focus on its spin-off, NCIS: Los Angeles, in 2011. Two years later, a similar storyline and cliff-hanger featuring the torture of two main characters was used for the fourth season finale. The characters, Sam Hanna (LL Cool J) and Marty Deeks (Eric Christian Olsen), are taken hostage by Isaak Sidorov, a Russian arms dealer who interrogates them for information. Unlike with the original NCIS, Brennan opted to have them tortured onscreen, with Sidorov electrocuting Sam and forcing a dentist drill into Deeks' mouth.

The choice to include the scene drew criticism; a number of viewers were disturbed by the torture and accused the producers of engaging in gratuitous violence. In response to complaints, Carla Day from TV Fanatic wrote an article naming several instances in which television shows featured storylines that included torture, among them Ziva's captivity storyline. She concluded that what was shown was "just enough to get the point across without overdoing it".

== See also ==
- Tony DiNozzo and Ziva David
